= Commercial road, Ooty =

Roadway in Tamil Nadu, India

Commercial road is an important roadway passing through foothills in the township of Ooty, Tamil Nadu. The road is characterized by busy pedestrian and road traffic. As the name suggests, the road is an important commercial hub of the town. The most important junction on the road is Charring cross, which is considered to be one of the most important and beautiful places in Ooty. The region adjoining the roadway houses various commercial establishments like Kairali, a Handicrafts Development Corporation of Kerala showroom.

== Events ==
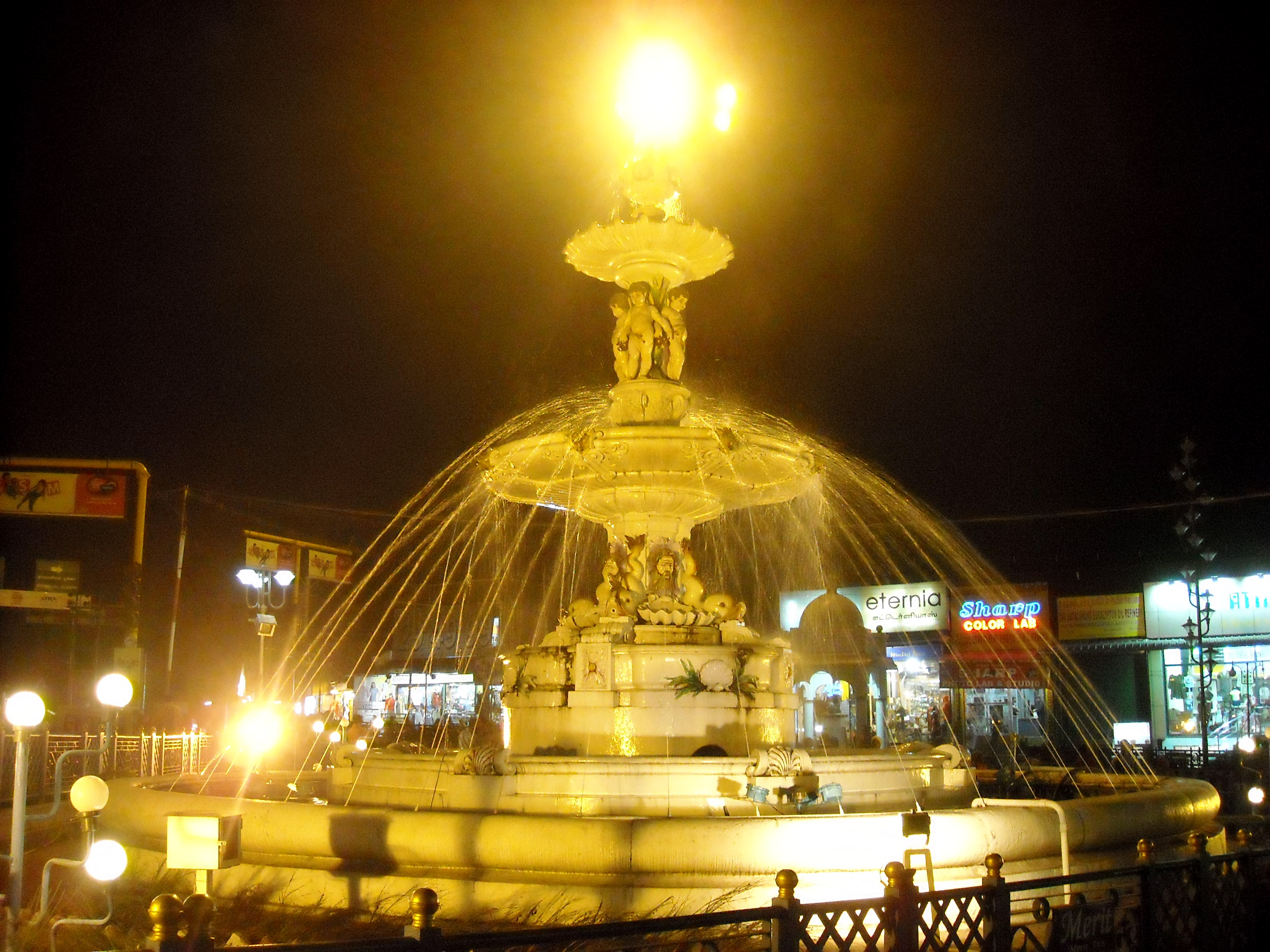
Night time view of Adam's fountain in Charring cross

A famous procession event of Santa Claus, called Santa Comes to Town, is held on the roadway annually during Christmas season. The event has been carried out on the roadway since 1985. It is organised by Needle Industries (India) Private Limited, based in Ketti. The procession is characterized by Santa Claus riding a sleigh along the roadway distributing hundreds of colourful balloons to children. Many tourists from across the globe attend the procession annually. Other notable events on the roadway include book fairs held annually.

== Footpath concerns ==
The road has had concerns over congestion in the footpath adjoining the road due to vegetable sale outlets being run on the footpath. As the pedestrian traffic is high on the footpath, these vegetable sale outlets had added to the congestion in addition to increasing the risk of injury to the pedestrians. Concerns of environmental damage had also been raised as these illegal sales outlets promote banned plastic carry bags. This issue also has had an effect on the business routine of regular authorized shopkeepers and retailers near the roadway.

== See also ==
- Government Rose Garden, Ooty
- Government Botanical Gardens, Udagamandalam
- Ooty Lake
- Ooty Golf Course
- Stone House, Ooty
- Ooty Radio Telescope
- Mariamman temple, Ooty
- St. Stephen's Church, Ooty
- Kamaraj Sagar Dam
