= Adam's fountain =

Public fountain in Ooty, Tamil Nadu, India

Coordinates: 11.412621°N 76.708213°E

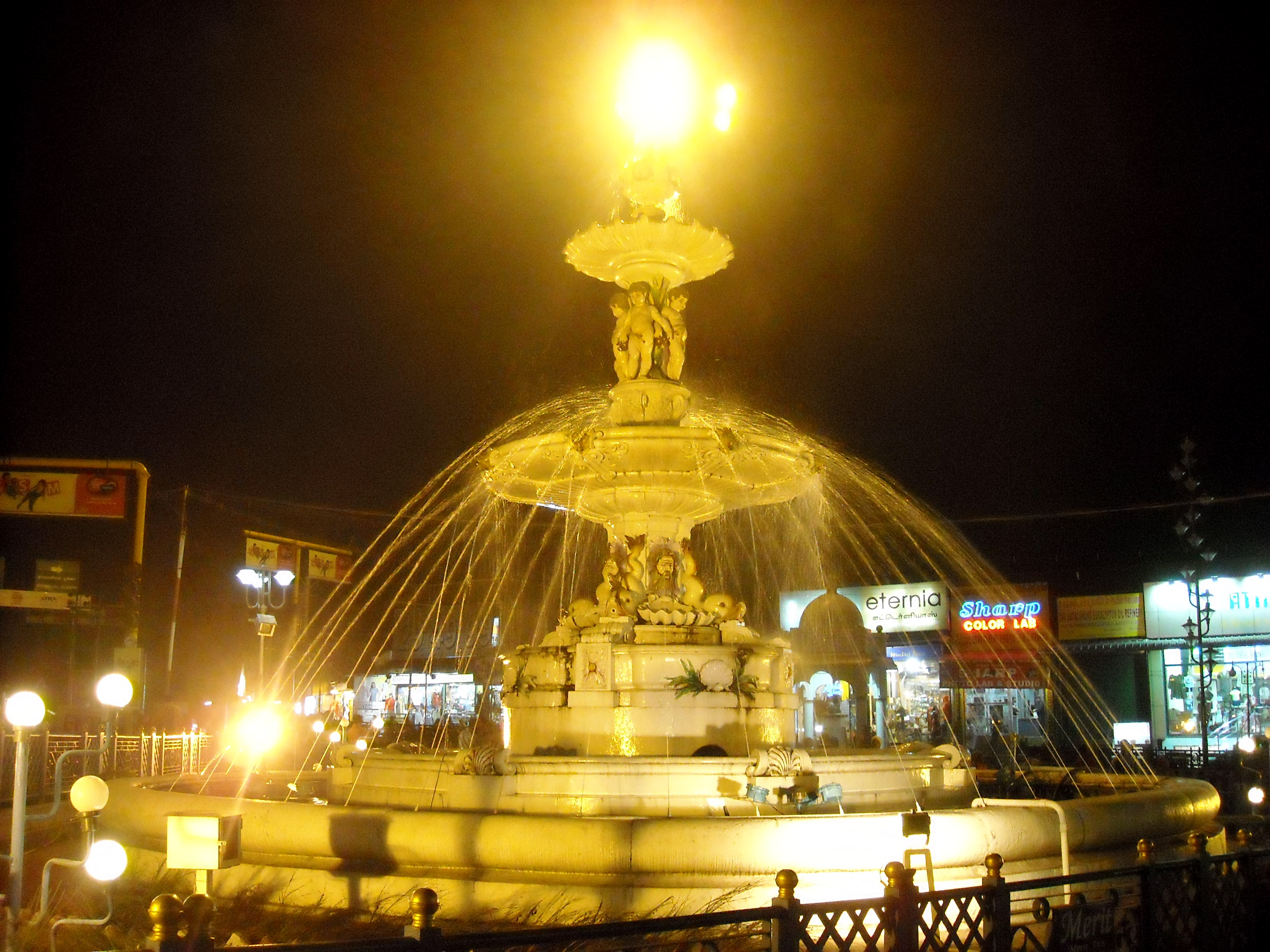
Night time view of Adam's fountain

Adam's fountain is a public display fountain in Charring cross, Ooty. It was built in 1886 as a memorial to a Governor of Ooty, who was very famous in the region during his tenure. The total cost of finishing the fountain was between Rs. 13,000 to Rs. 14000, which was funded through public funding.

== History ==
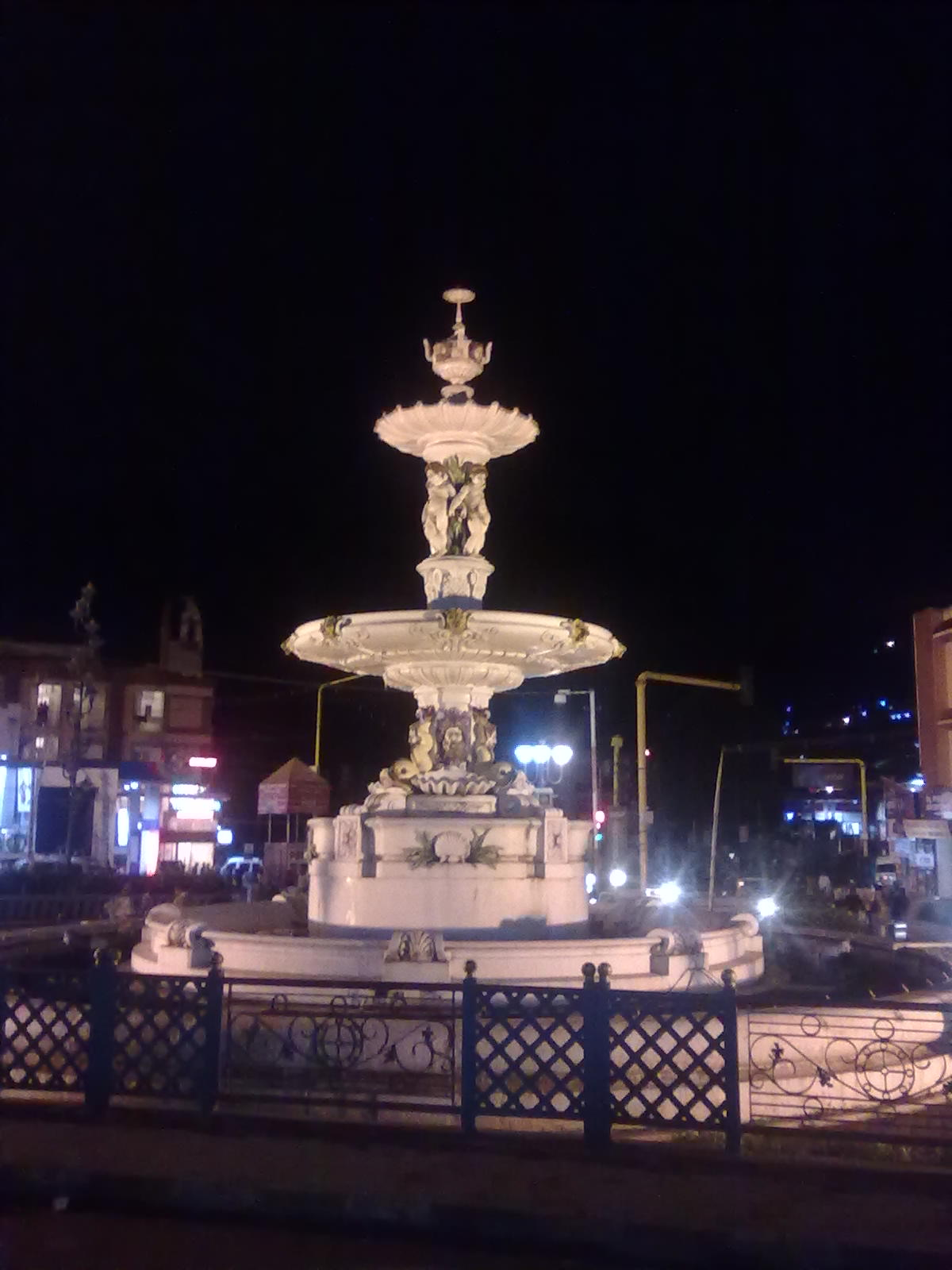
Adam's fountain

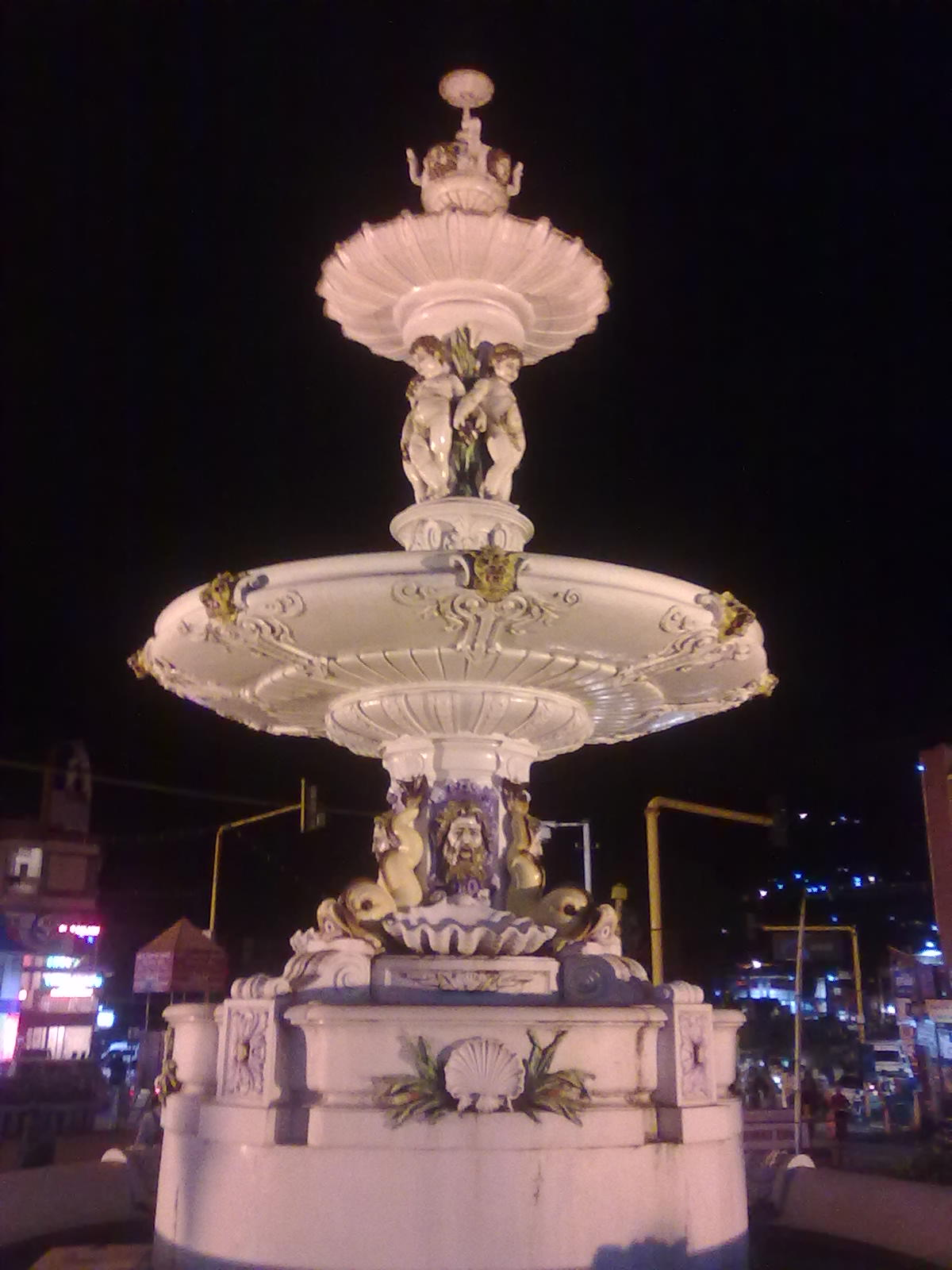
Night time view of Adam's fountain

It was initially planned to be placed near the Ooty market. But it was later decided that the site in front of the District collector's office in Ooty was a better place as it had more passersby. After building the fountain, it was discovered that the site needed the waterhead to function correctly. It was finally moved to its present location in Charring Cross in 1898. An old melanoxylon tree, which stood in the site of the present location of the fountain, considered a landmark in Charring Cross, was removed for the fountain's construction.

== Tourist attraction ==
As the fountain is located in one of the most important places in Ooty, it is an important tourist landmark in the Ooty town.

== See also ==
- Ooty Lake
- Stone House, Ooty
- Mariamman temple, Ooty
- Ooty Golf Course
- St. Stephen's Church, Ooty
