= Ooty Municipal Market =

Retail market in Tamil Nadu, India

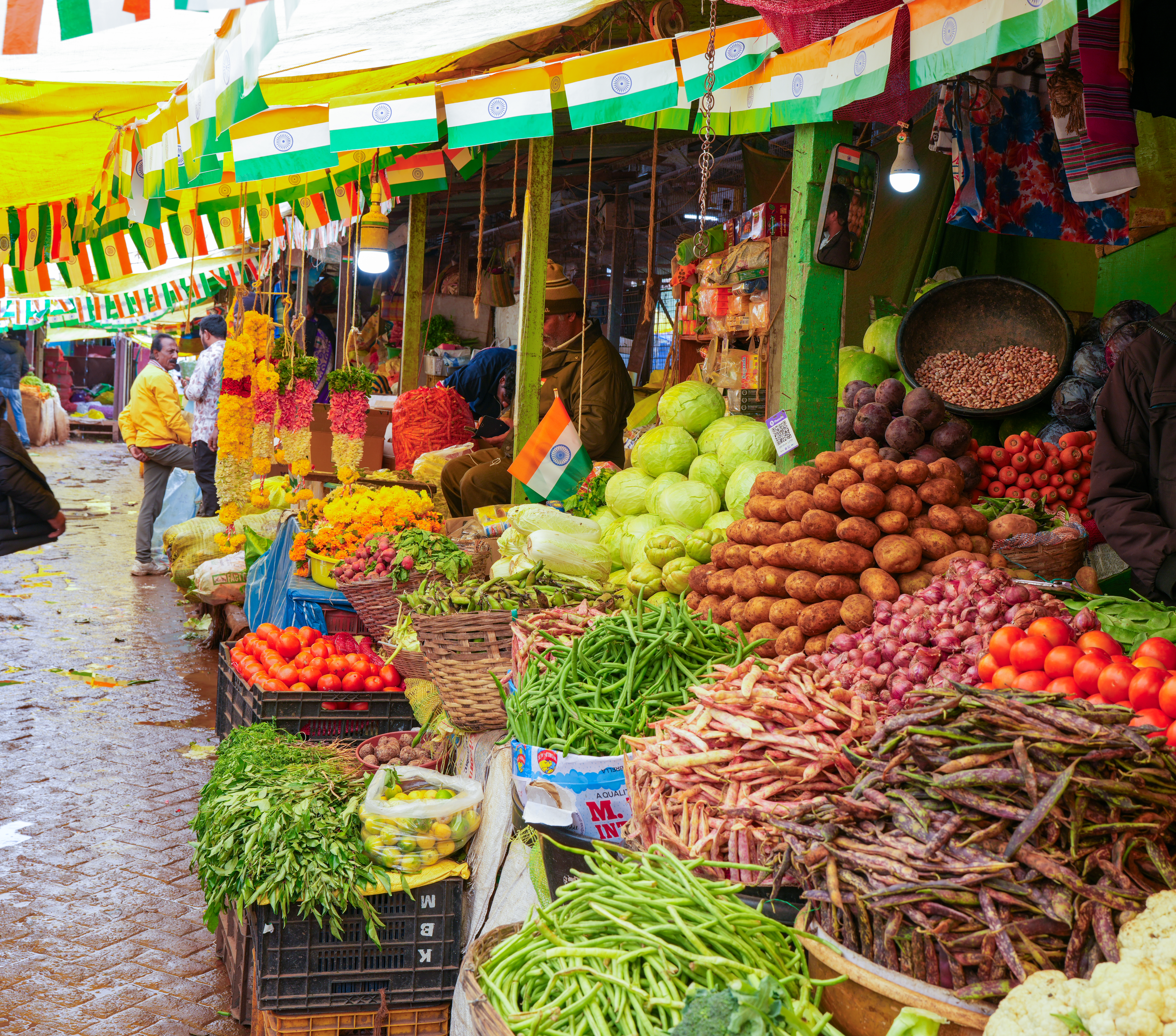
- Vegetable and flower stalls
- Location: Ooty; 11°24′24.3936″N 76°42′10.2096″E
- Opening date: 1848 (178 years ago)
- Management: Udhagamandalam Municipality
- Owner: Udhagamandalam Municipality
- Interactive map of Ooty Municipal Market

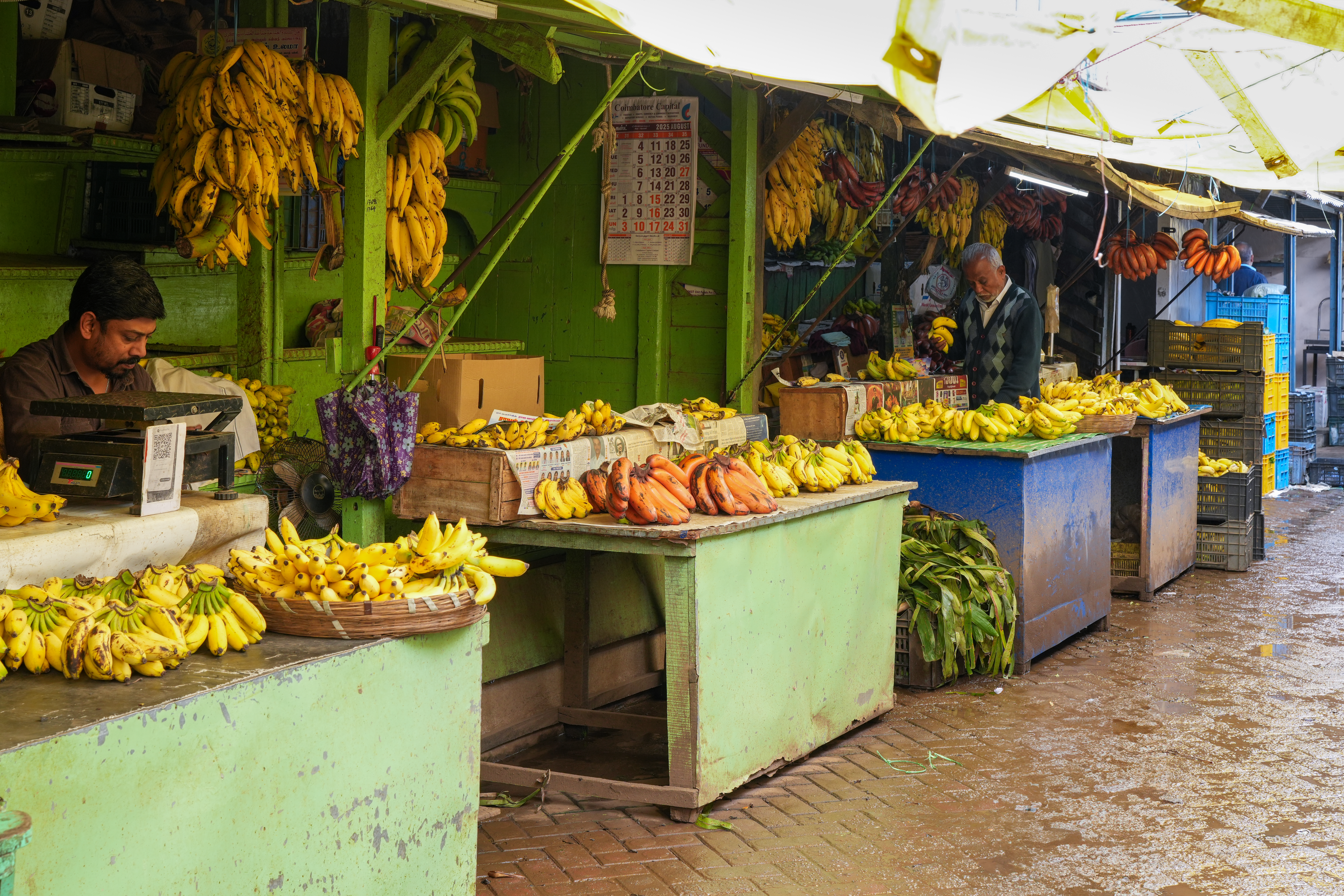
Banana stalls

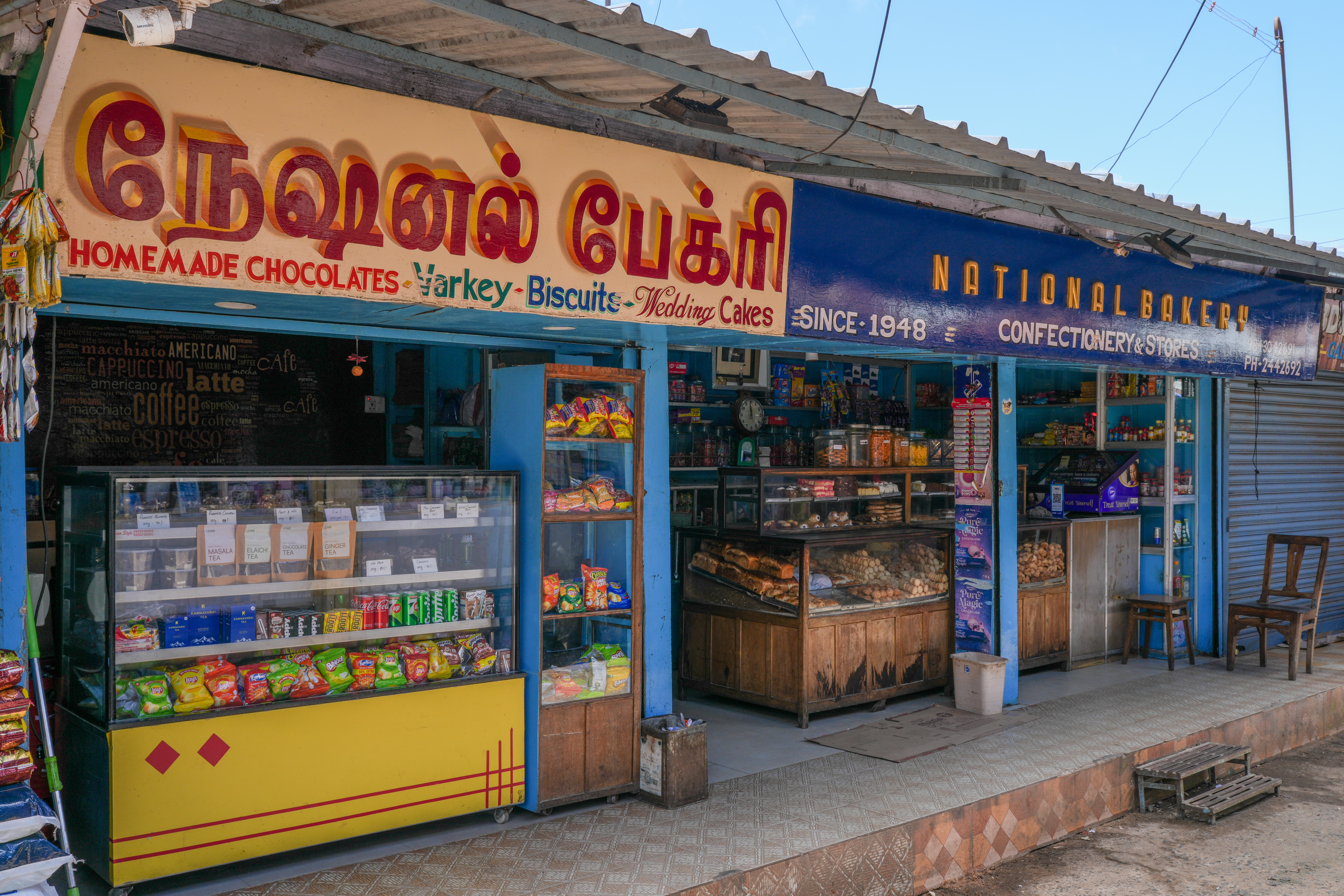
National Bakery, established 78 years ago

The Ooty Municipal Market is located in the Nilgiris district in Tamil Nadu. Built in 1848, it was previously considered to be a model market in India. It is one of the largest retail markets in India. This market is the most important shopping centre in Ooty and utilized by the people for shopping vegetables, fruits and groceries. In 2023, funds were sanctioned to modernise the market and the work is in progress.

== History ==
During the first few decades of the 19th century after the British established a presence in Ooty, the residents were served by a weekly market fair. In mid-1846, Lord Tweeddale, Governor of Madras (1842–48), during his visit to Ooty recommended approval of a permanent market place. Though this was sanctioned promptly, the initial plan had to be revised to include stone in mortar foundations owing to boggy soil. Construction started only in 1847. The market place was completed in mid-1848, at a cost of Rs. 5,813. Initially, the market was run by a Supervisor until the Municipality was formed in 1866.

In 1885, two large buildings were added at a cost of Rs. 61,000. One was used for beef and mutton stalls. A number of stalls were built in 1893 for European vegetables, fruit, poultry, eggs, and fresh and salt fish. Along with meat-hanging sheds these extensions cost Rs. 22,000. In 1903–04, sheds for native vegetables were added and the entire market area was fenced at a cost of Rs. 11,400. During 1905–06, demolition and reconstruction of the original buildings started.

By the start of the 21st century, the market was suffering from overcrowding and safety issues. In 2020, a fire in the early hours destroyed over 81 shops. Subsequently, in 2023, the Government of Tamil Nadu sanctioned Rs. 18.23 crores (182.3 million) for modernisation of the market and construction was started.

== Description ==
The Ooty Municipal Market is over 150 years old. It was previously considered to be a model market of India. Events like Market shows were held in the market premises years ago. It features 1,500 permanent sales outlets and 500 temporary outlets. There is a daily wholesale auction of these local fruits and vegetables at the Ooty Municipal Market.

The market is visited by 3,500 to 4,000 people on a typical weekday and between 4,000 and 5,000 people on weekends. During the summer tourist season in Ooty, the average number of visitors per day is more than 5,000. It has 15 gates around the perimeter for access.

== Modernisation ==
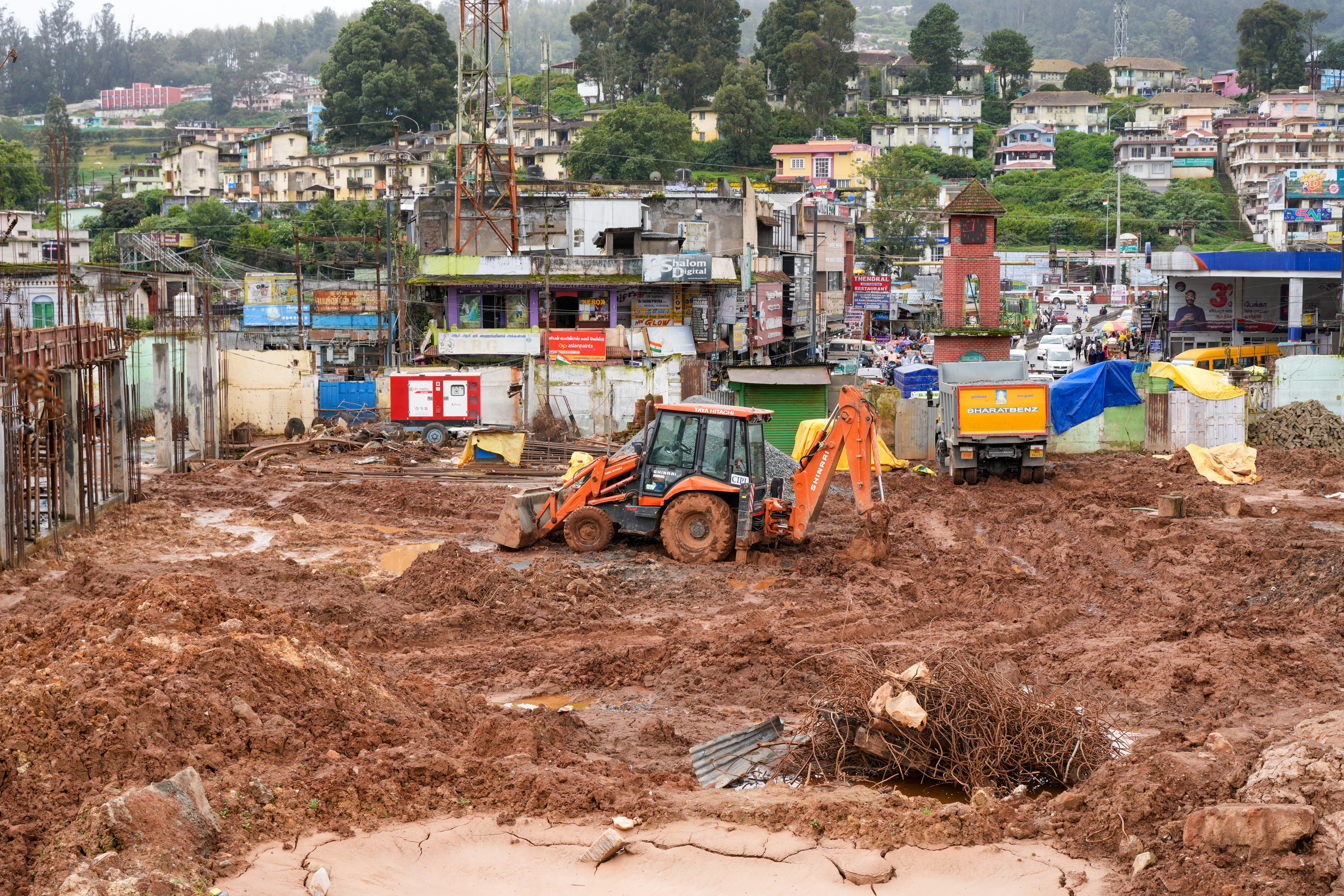
Preparing new foundations in the monsoon, August 2025

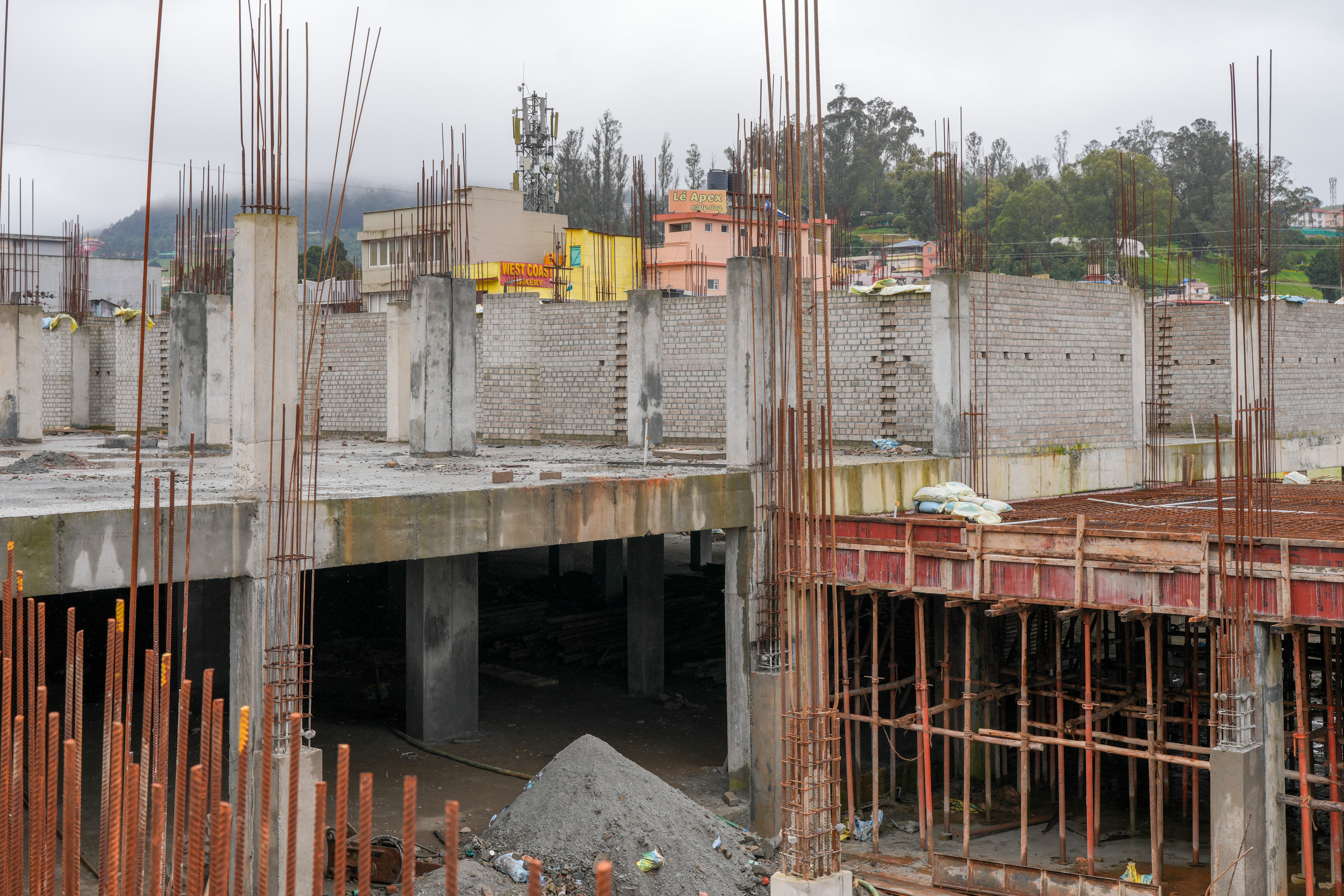
New multi-storey building under construction, August 2025

The market has had problems with increased congestion over the years. The market has not been able to cope with the increase in number of visitors. In June 2020, a fire broke out around 1:30 am, due to which about 81 shops were burnt. The loss was estimated at Rs. 2 crores (20 million). Officials attributed the spread of the fire to closely-packed shops with extensions into the pathways.

In February 2023, the Udhagamandalam Municipality announced that Rs. 18.23 crores (182.3 million) had been sanctioned by the Government of Tamil Nadu to rebuild part of the market. The plan envisaged tearing down of 190 shops. They would be replaced by about 271 shops with parking for 140 cars and 200 2-wheelers, and toilets and other amenities.

In 2024, with the sanction of additional funds, the modernisation plan was upgraded to replace about 650 shops in two phases. The Udhagamandalm Municipal Council said that temporary accommodation would be provided outside the market for the shops that were being demolished.

== Gallery ==
=== Fresh vegetables, fruits and flowers ===
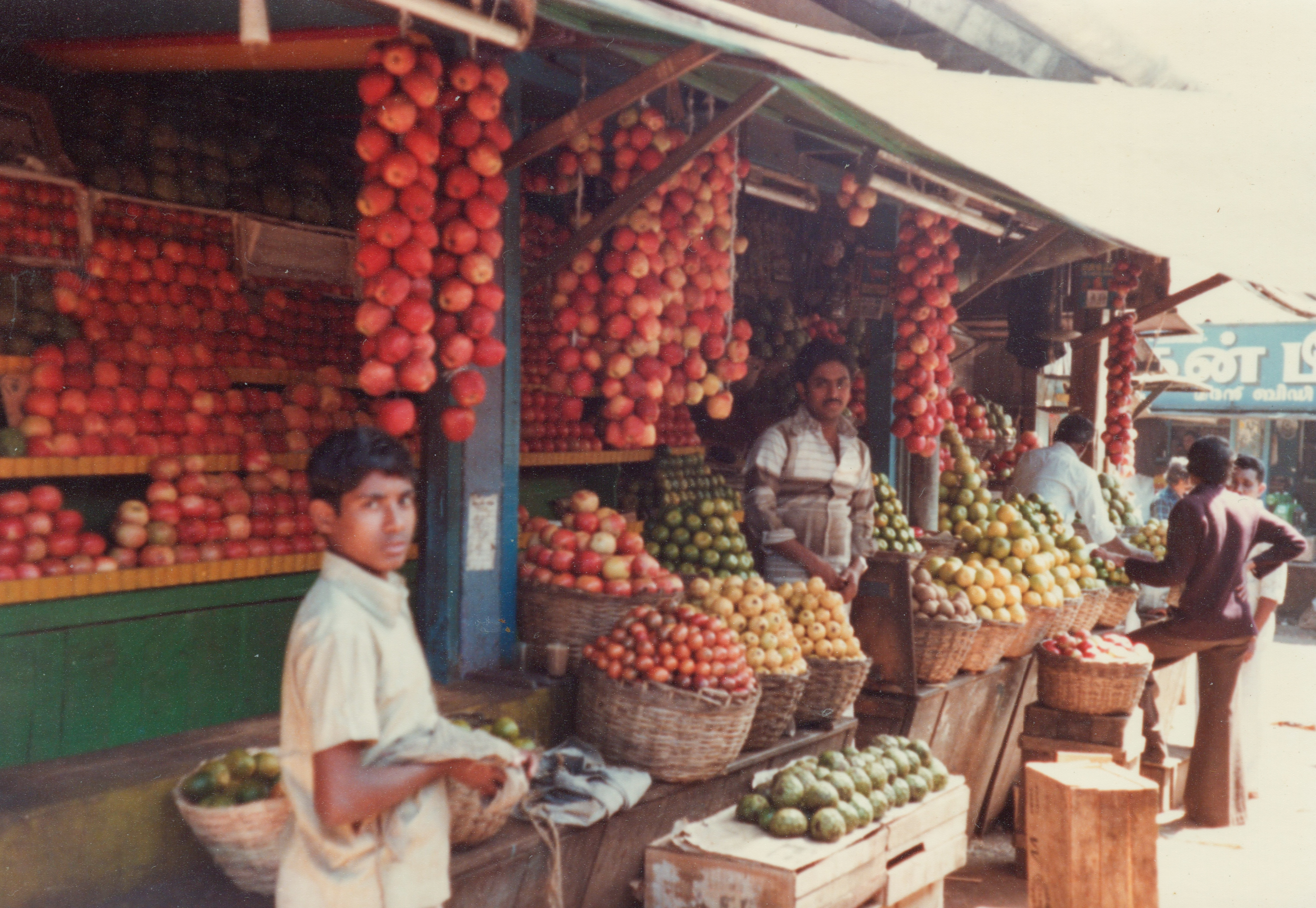
Fruit stalls in 1980 (46 years ago)

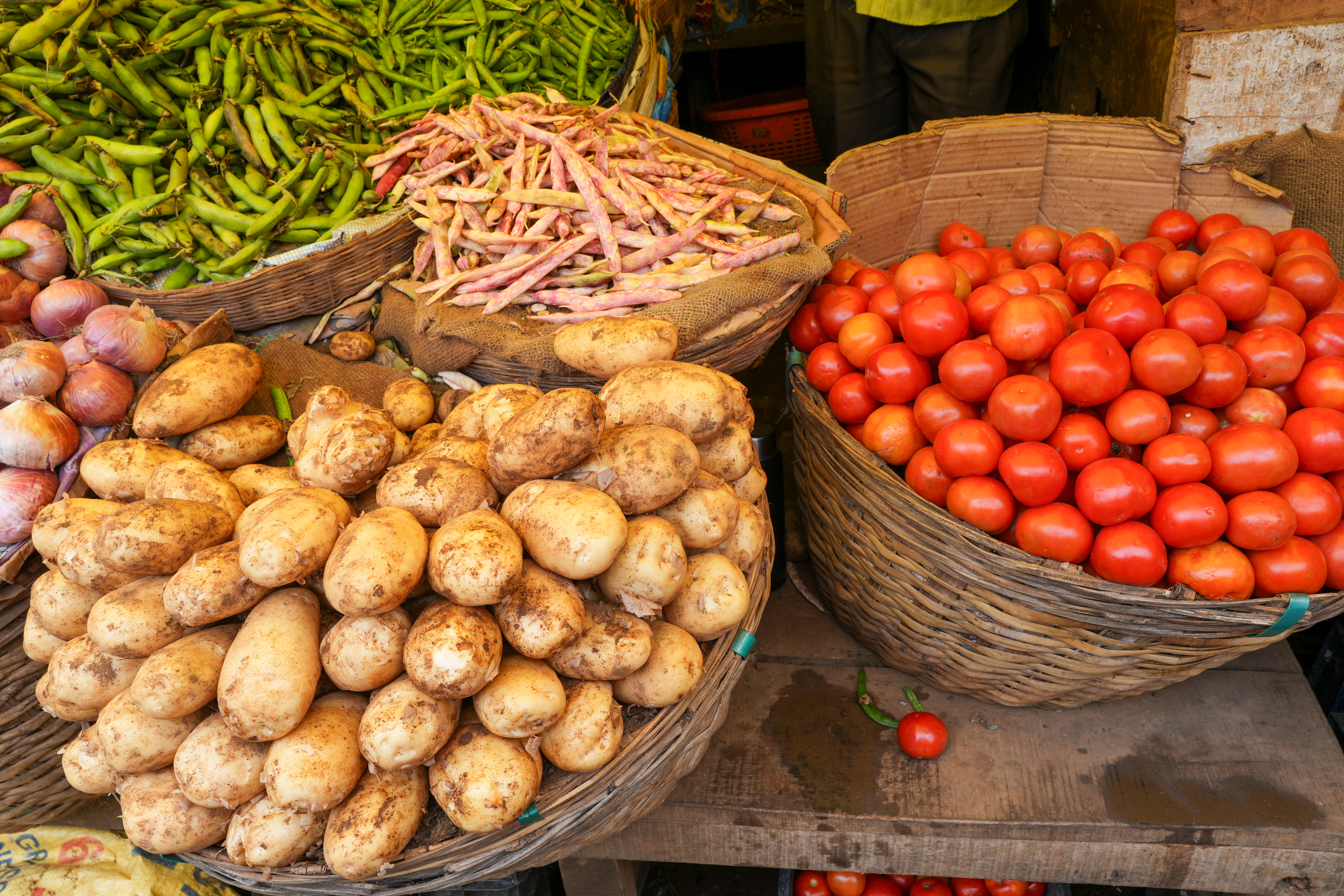
Potatoes, beans and tomatoes

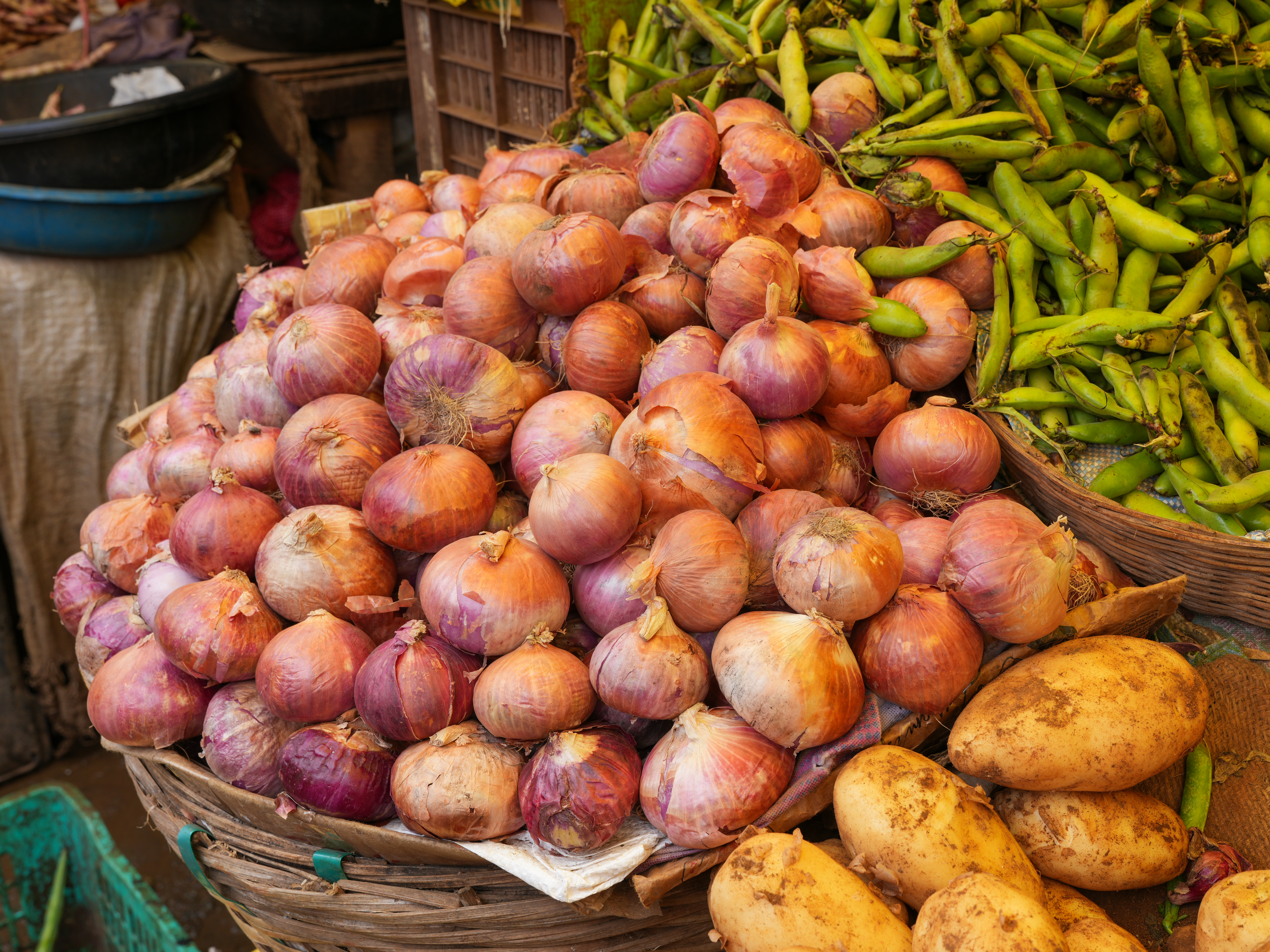
Onions in a vegetable stall

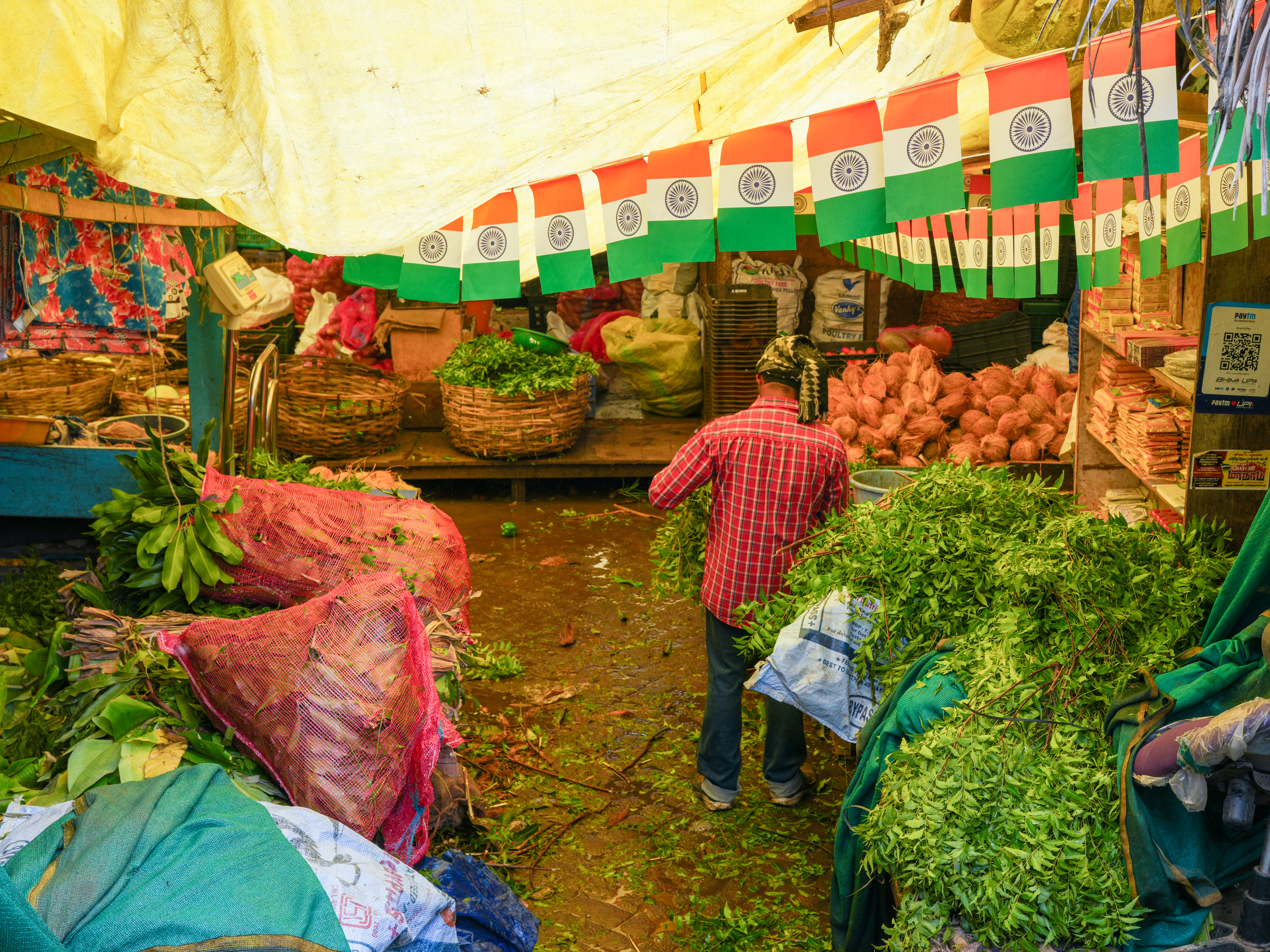
Fresh greens and coconuts

=== Fresh meat and eggs ===
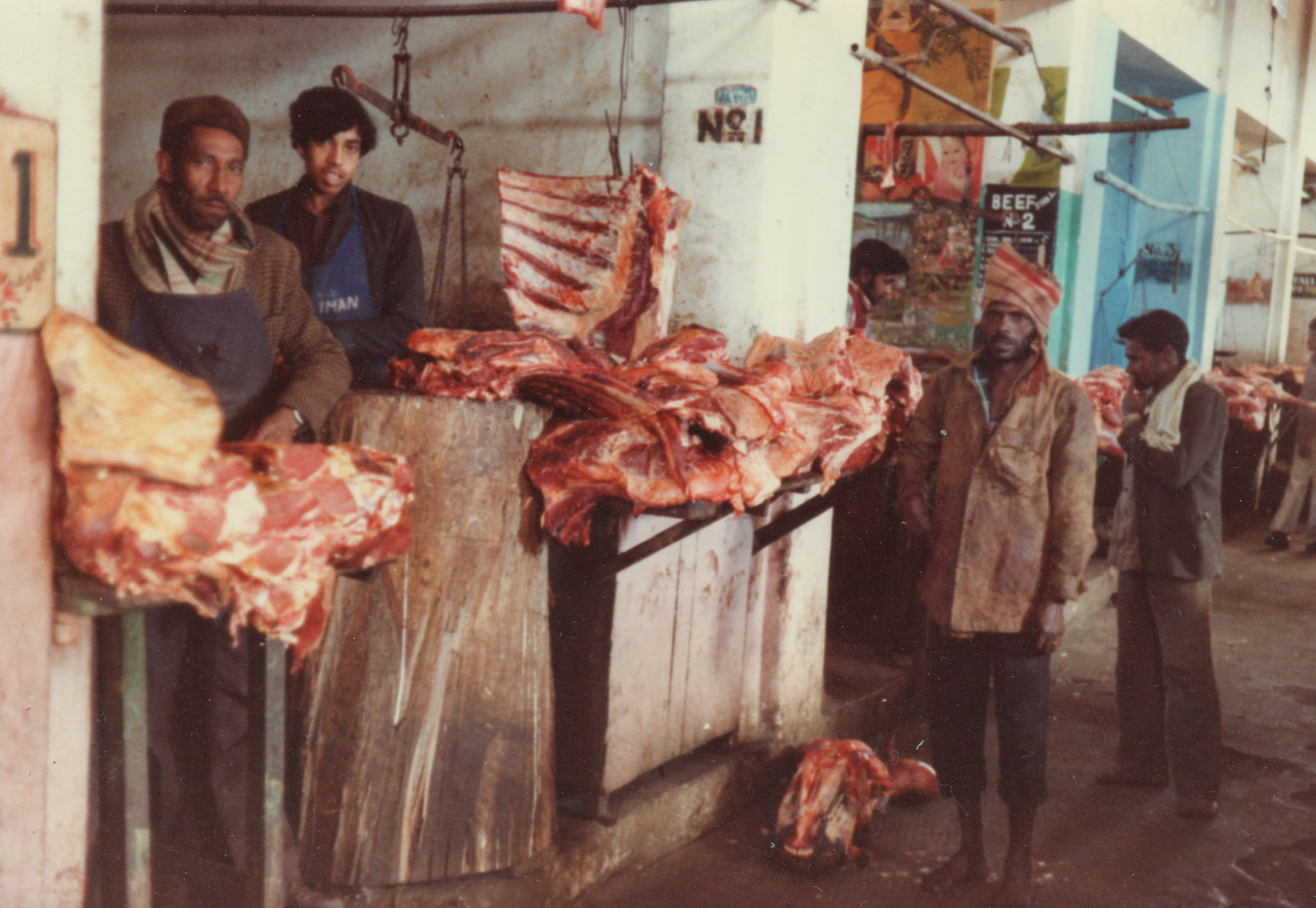
Beef stalls in 1980 (46 years ago)

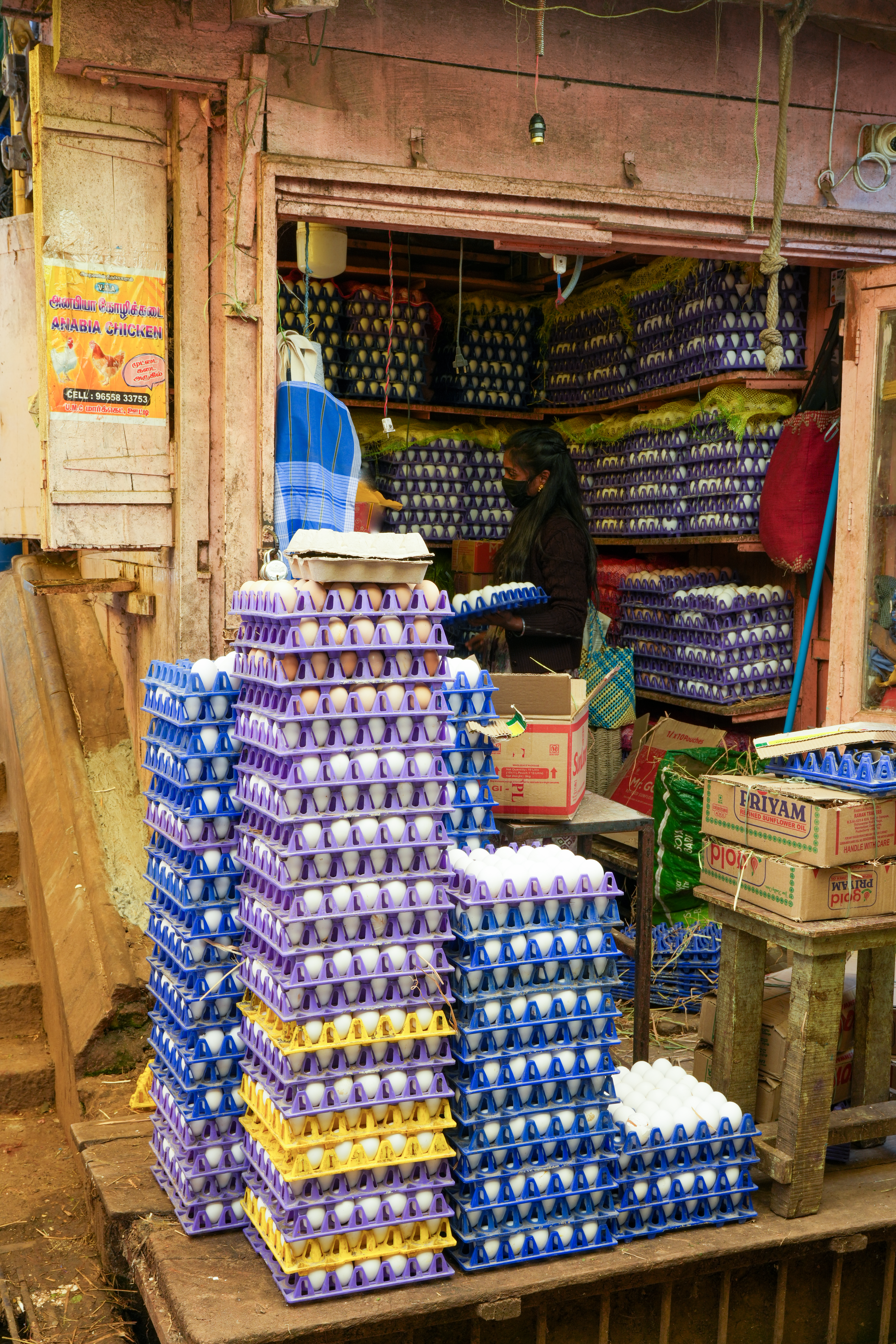
Fresh eggs, corner stall

=== Provisions and baked goods ===
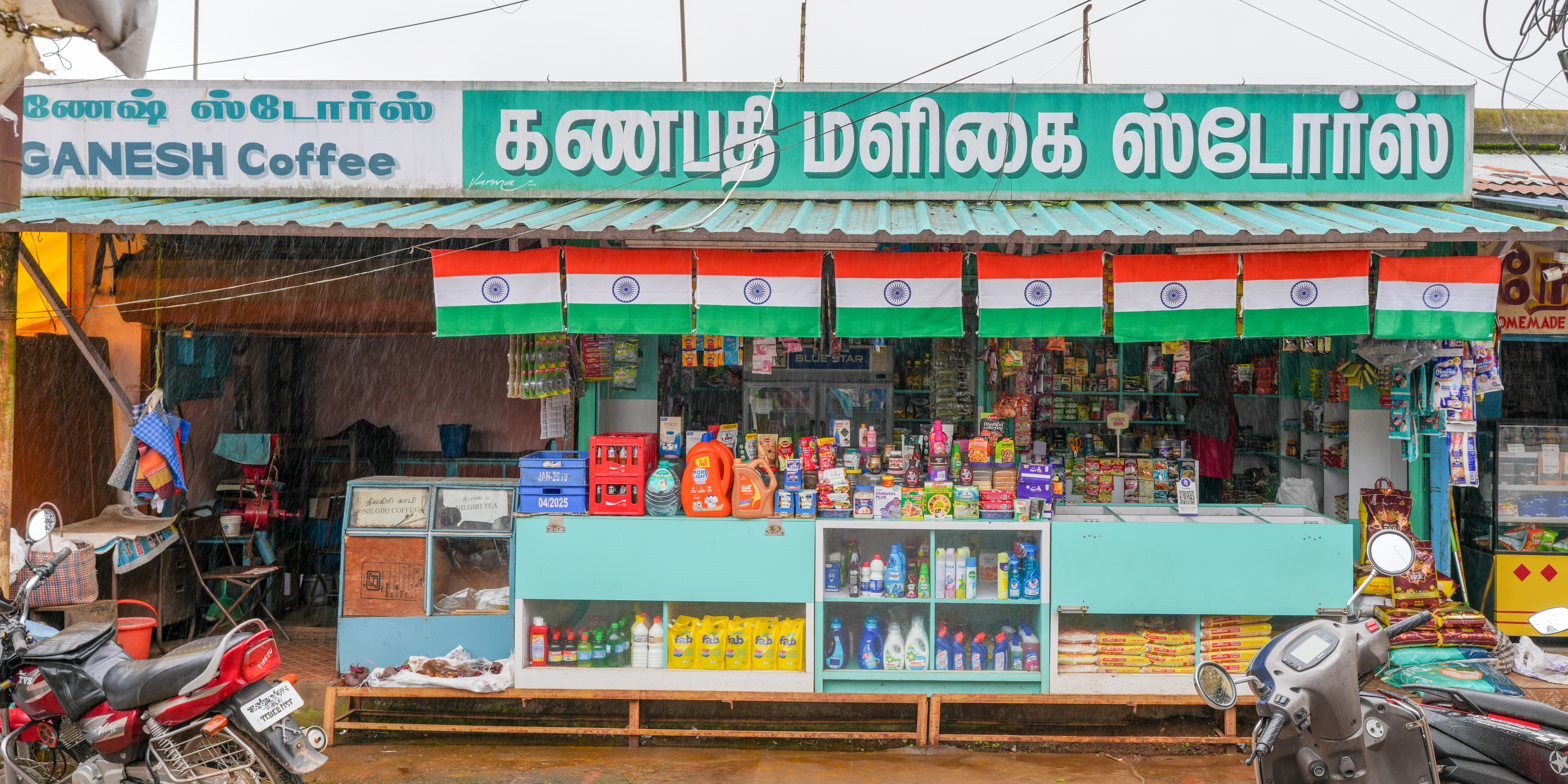
Fresh ground coffee, provisions shops

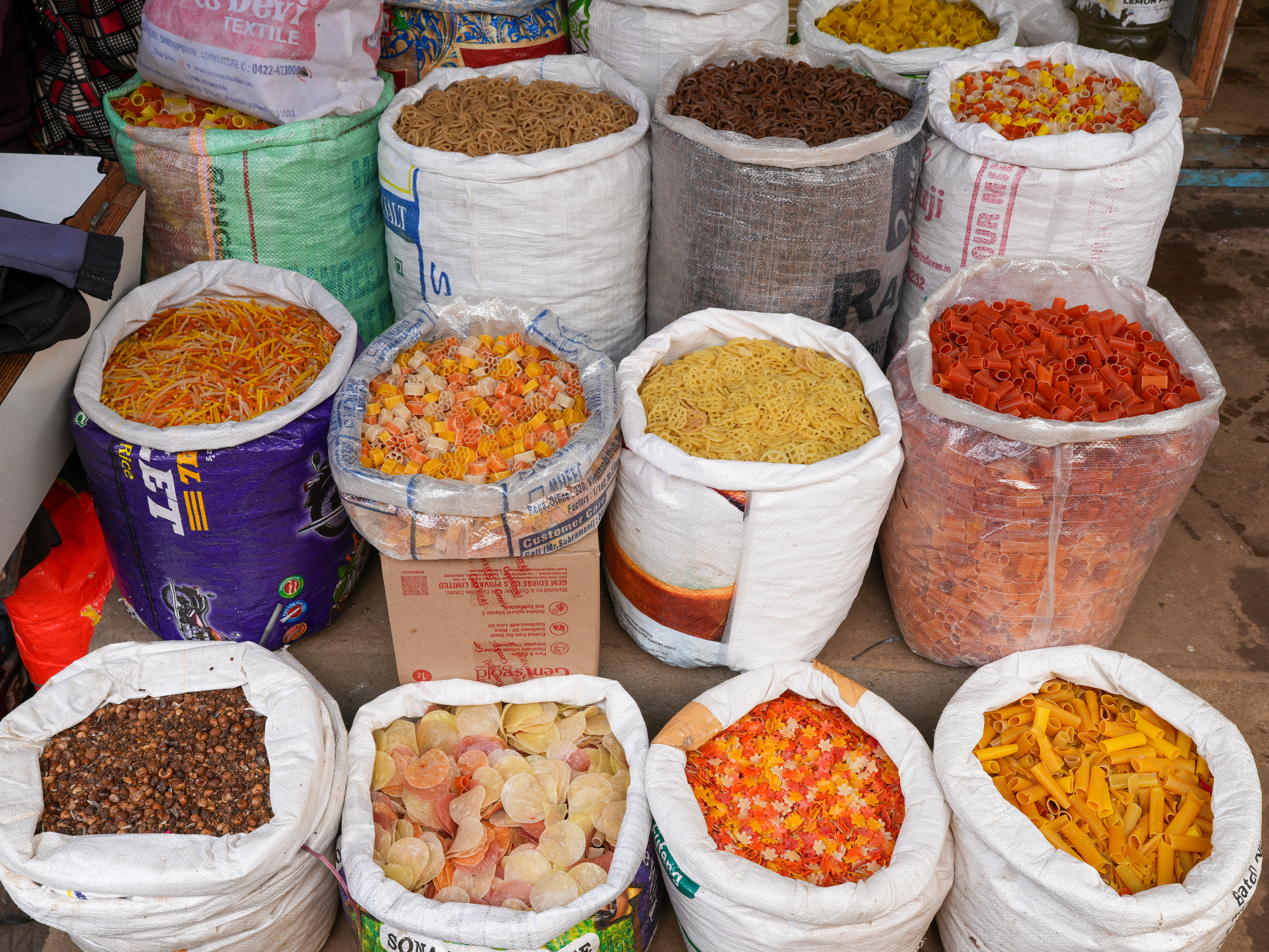
Display of assorted fryums for sale

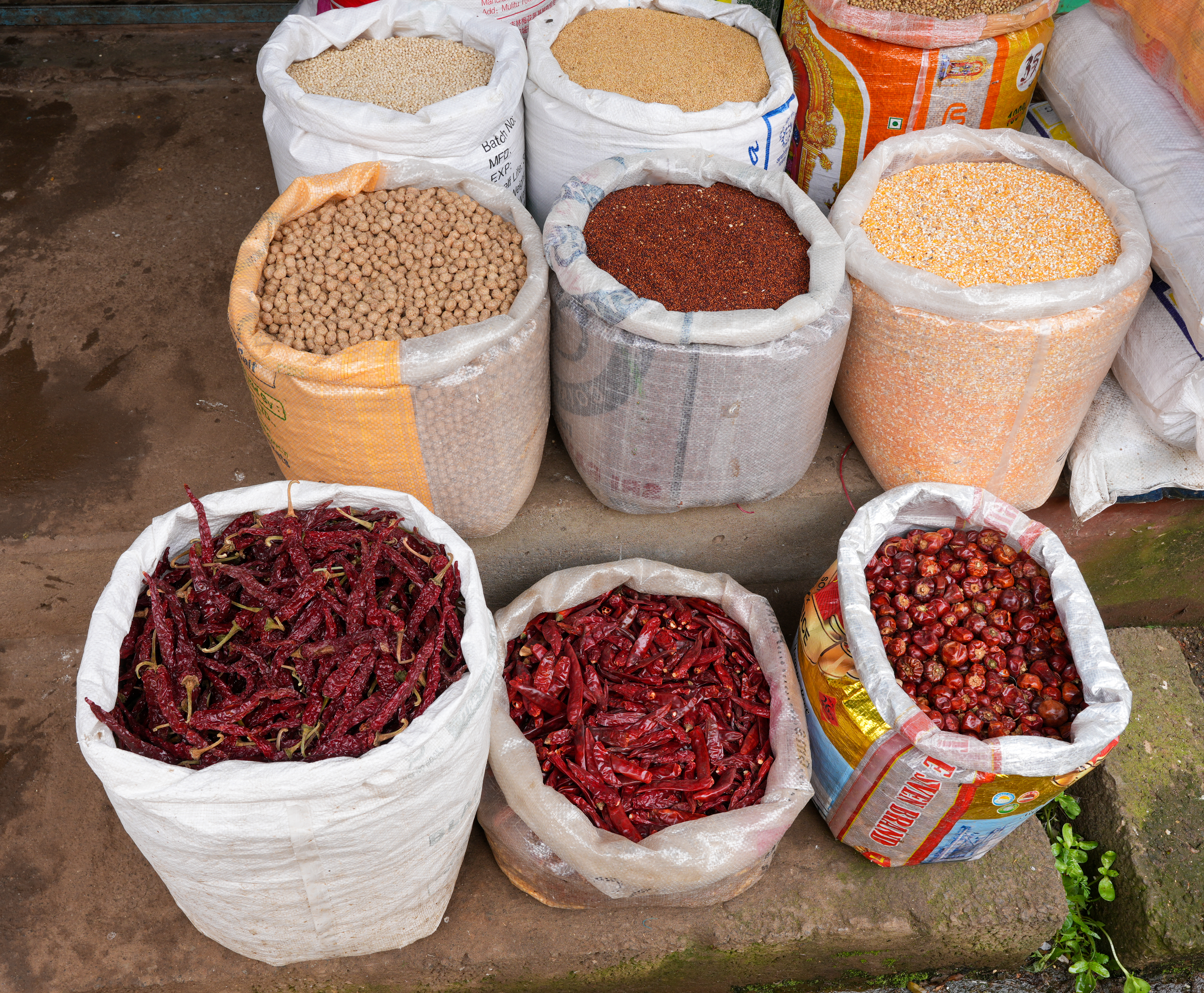
Dried chillies and legumes in a provision store

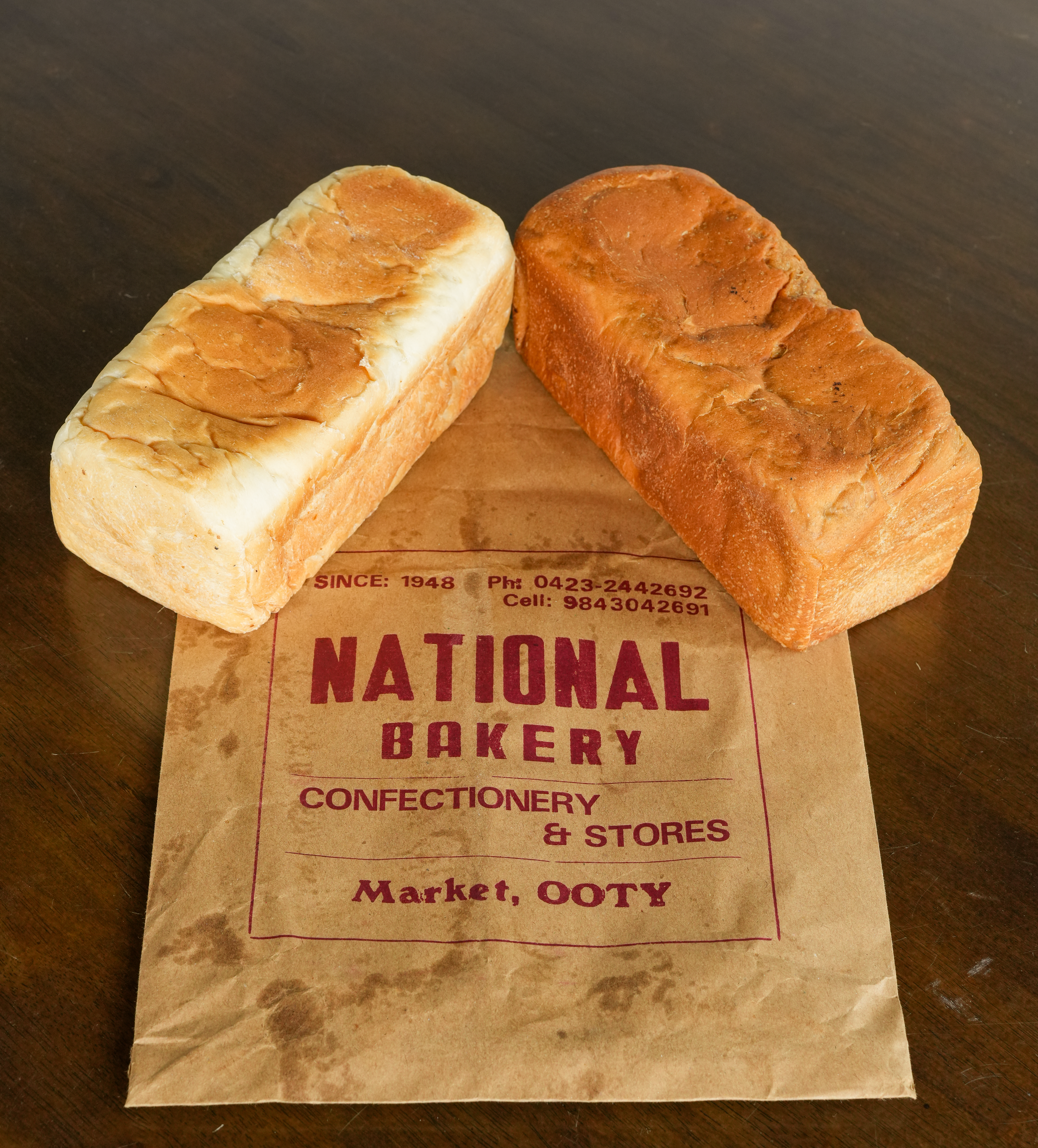
Freshly baked white and wheat bread

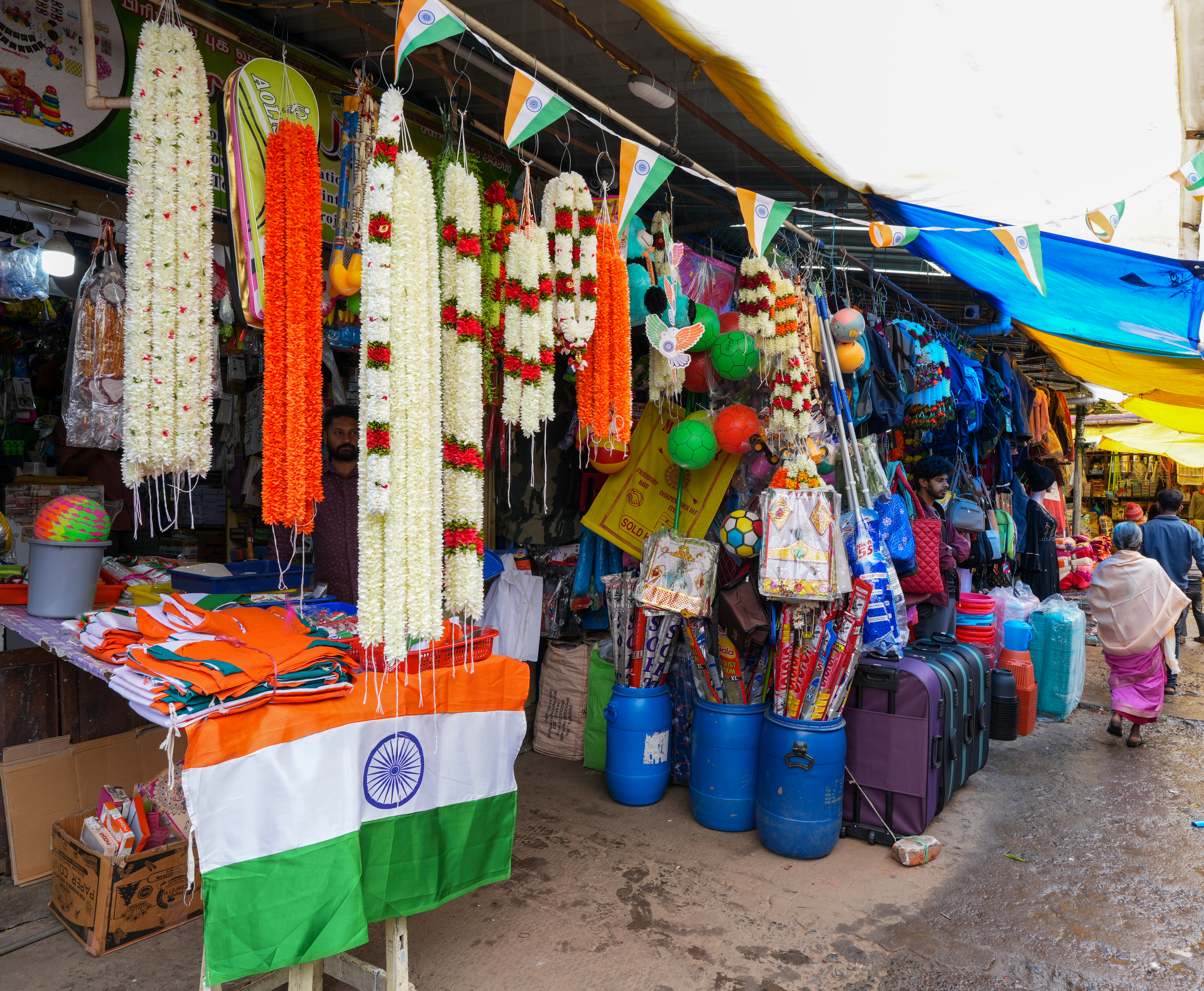
Household goods and flowers

=== Services ===
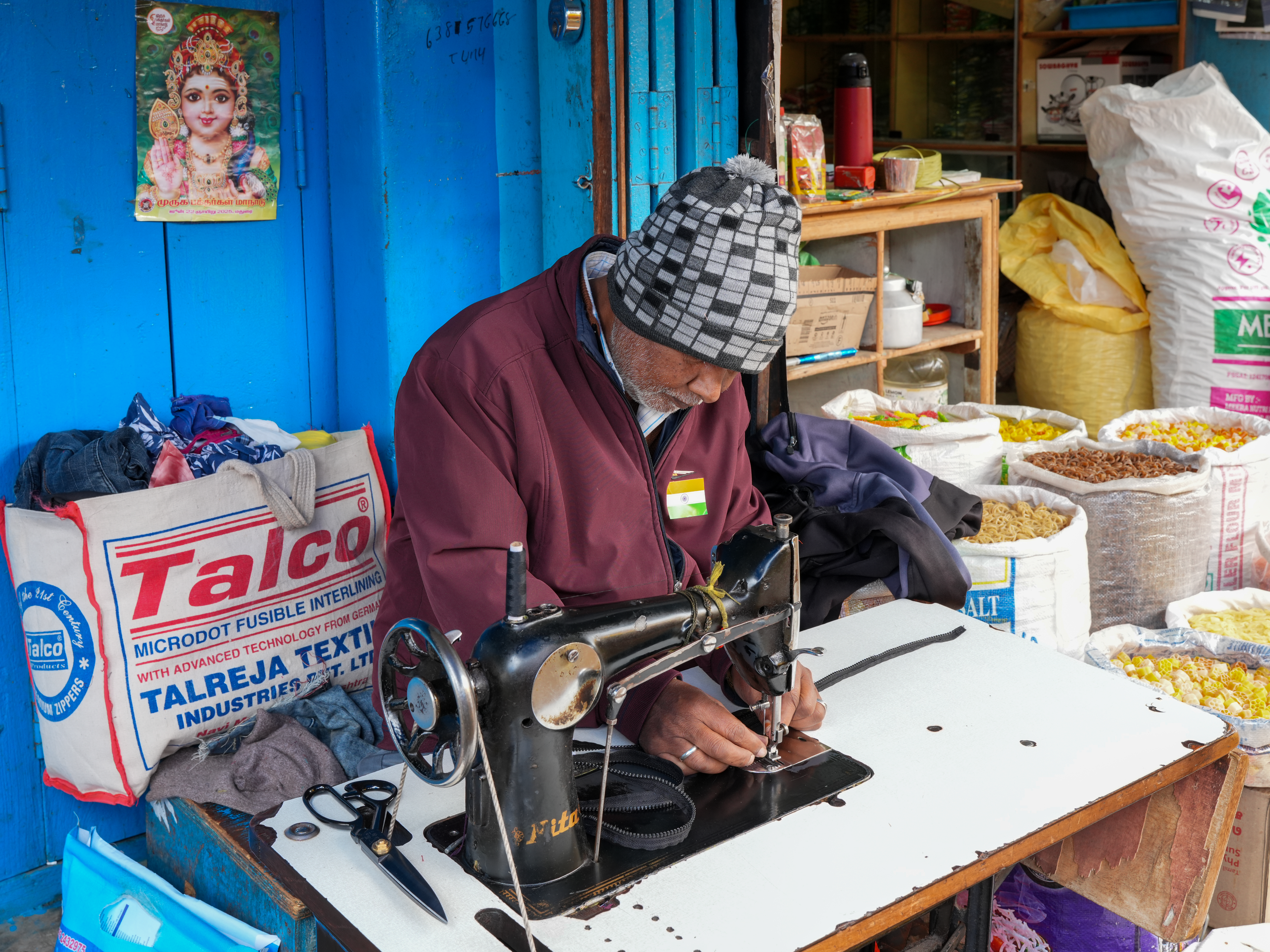
Tailor by the wayside serves customers

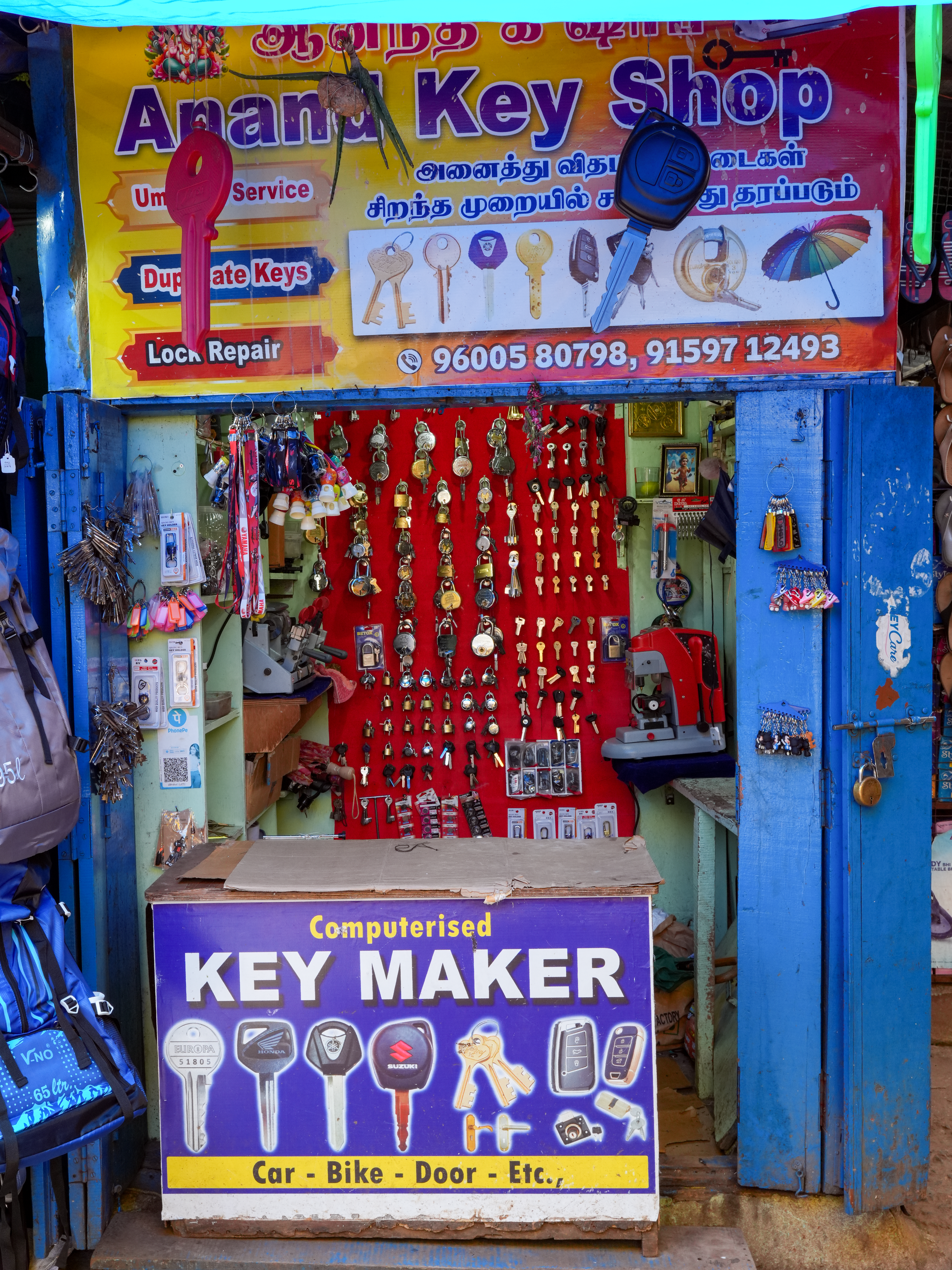
Locksmith makes replacement keys

== See also ==
- Ooty bus stand
- Charring Cross, Ooty
- Commercial road, Ooty
