= Ooty bus stand =

Central Bus station in Ooty, Tamil Nadu (India)

Udhagamandalam Central Bus Stand
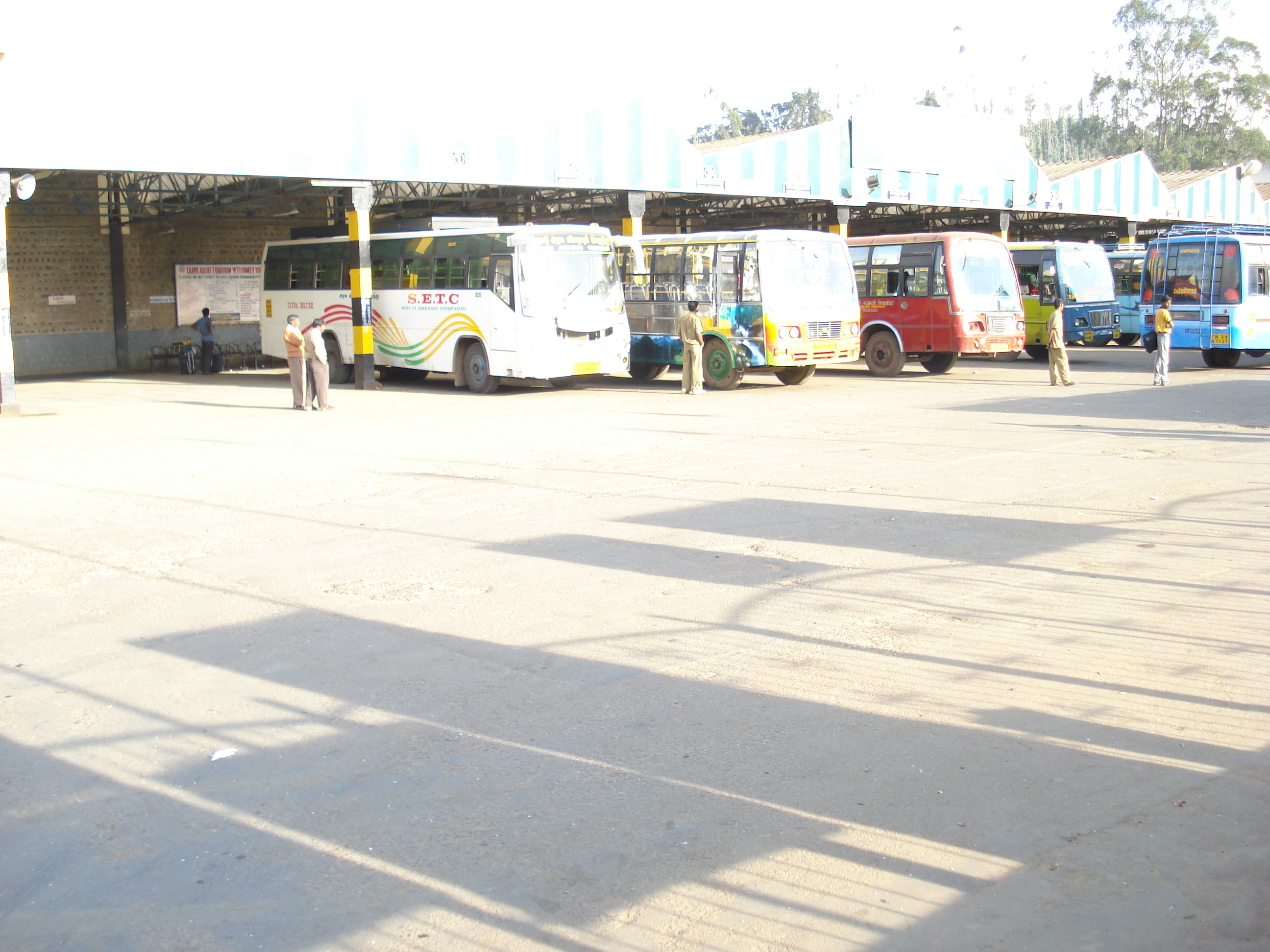

General information
- Location: Kathadimattam, Ooty; Tamil Nadu; India
- Coordinates: 11.4035°N 76.6963°E
- Elevation: 2,210 metres (7,250 ft)
- System: Bus station
- Owner: Government of Tamil Nadu
- Operator: TNSTC Coimbatore
- Platforms: 10

Construction
- Parking: Yes
- Cycle facilities: Yes

Other information
- Station code: OTY
- Fare zone: Tamil Nadu

History
- Closed: N/A
Location

Ooty Bus Stand, also known as Udhagamandalam Central Bus Stand, is a bus station located in the town of Ooty. It serves as main bus stand for The Nilgiris district, Tamil Nadu, apart from bus stands in Coonoor, Kotagiri and Gudalur.

== Location ==
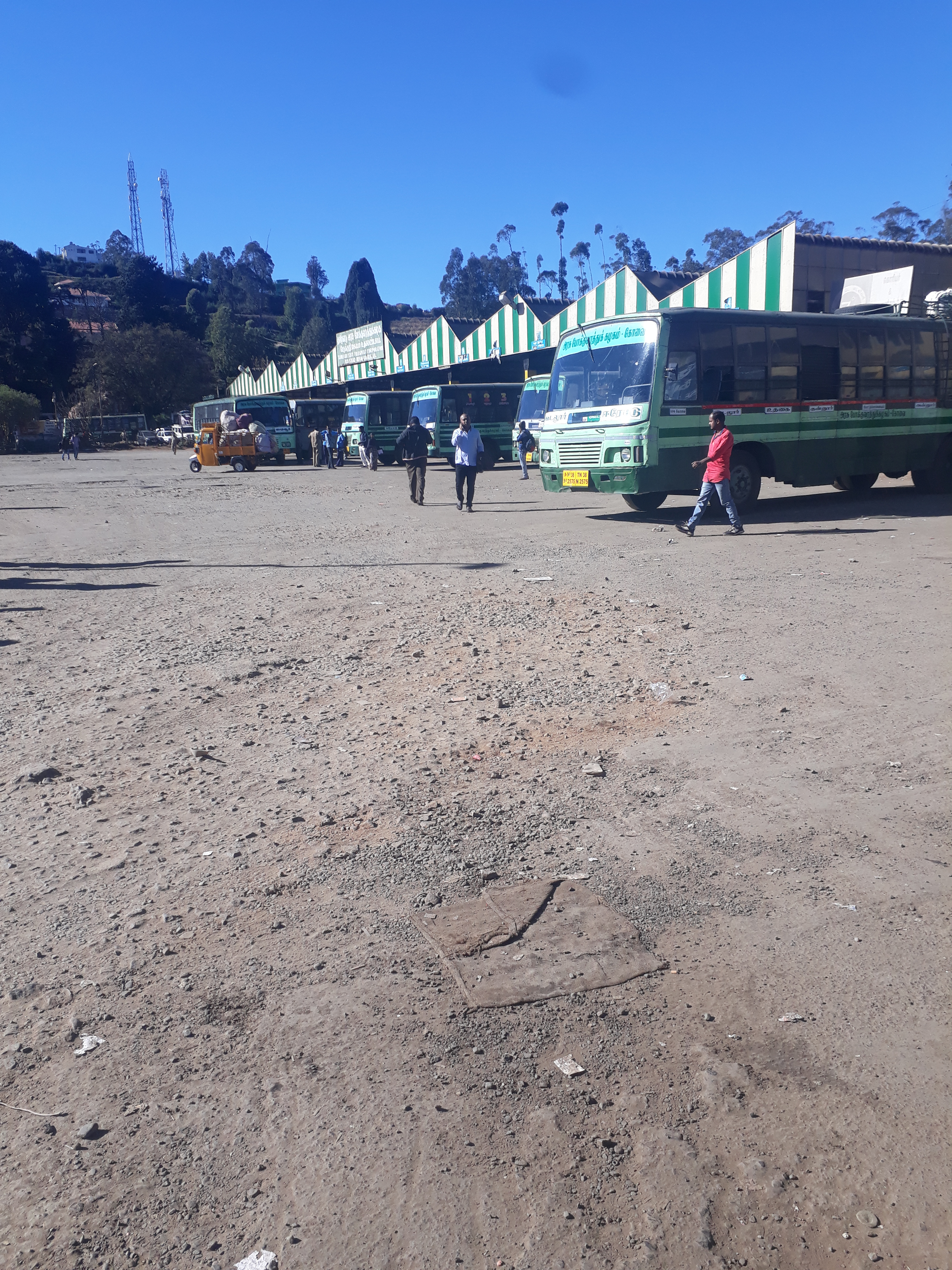
Ooty bus stand

It is located near the Udhagamandalam railway station. The land on which the bus stand stands on now was originally occupied by the Ooty lake, which was later reclaimed to build the bus stand.

== Services ==
The bus stand having about 10 platforms serves nearby towns of the district. The major operators from the bus stand are state–run TNSTC (Coimbatore, Kumbakonam, Tirupur, Erode and Salem), SETC (Trichy, Kanyakumari, Thiruvananthapuram and Chennai), Karnataka State Road Transport Corporation (Bengaluru, Mysuru, Mercara and Hassan) and Kerala State Road Transport Corporation (Sulthan Bathery, Kannur and Malappuram). To deposit luggage cloak room facility available in bus stand, 10 Rs per bag 8 hrs. No private operators were allowed to ply within the district.

== Depots ==
This bus stand also has TNSTC-OOTY Regional office & OOTY-1, OOTY-2 depots of TNSTC.

== See also ==
- Charring cross, Ooty
- Adam's fountain
- Glenmorgan, Ooty
