= Summer Festival in The Nilgiris =

Summer Festival is a festival celebrated in the Nilgiri mountains of India each May. The festival is organized by the Tamil Nadu Department of Tourism and the national Ministry of Tourism. Events during the festival include cultural programmes, a Flower Show, a Rose Show, a Dog Show, a Fruit Show, a Spice Show, a Vegetable Show, a Boat Race, and Boat pageantry.

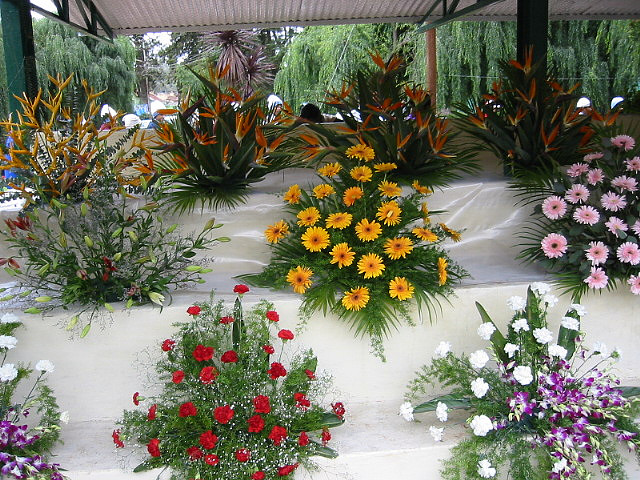
Flower show in Ooty

- Cultural programmes. Dance, drama and music programmes, emphasizing classical arts, are held at Breeks HADP open air stadium, Ooty.
- Flower show. The flower show is held at the Botanical Garden in Ooty during the third week of May. Two hundred fifty exhibitors display more than 150 varieties of flowers; attendance is estimated at 150,000. The first Flower Show was organised in 1896.
- Rose show. The rose show is held at the Government Rose Garden in Ooty during the second week of May. Highlights include rose towers made of thousands of roses and rose petal rangolis. The garden has more than 3,000 varieties of roses.
- Fruit show. The two-day fruit show is conducted in Sim's Park, Coonoor during the last week of May. The event is organized by the Department of Horticulture and has been held annually for 53 years. It attracts about 25,000 attendees.
- Dog show. The dog show, organised by South of India Kennel Club (SIKC), is held at the Government Arts College ground in Ooty.
- Spice show. The two-day spice show is held in Gudalur, Nilgiris at Saint Thomas Higher Secondary School. The spice show is organised by district administration and the departments of horticulture and tourism at Gudalur; it was first held in 2010.
- Vegetable show. The two-day vegetable show is held at Nehru Park in Kotagiri. It is organised by the Department of Horticulture and has been held for four years. It attracts about 16,000 attendees. The highlight of the vegetable show is the map of India made with red, yellow and green capsicums.
- Boat race and boat pageantry. The boat race and pageantry last for two days at Ooty Lake.
- Other events. Other events during the festival include a hot air balloon show, a tour of heritage buildings, an amateur photo competition and painting exhibition, an eco-trekking programme, a vintage car rally, a marathon race and a market show.
