= Azhagar Ramanujam =

Indian academic and activist

Dr. Azhagar Ramanujam
- Citizenship: India
- Occupation: Tamil language Professor at Ooty Arts College
- Employer: Government Arts College, Ooty
- Organization: National Service Scheme
- Known for: Social Service
- Notable work: Spreading awareness about social issues including health, environment protection, improvement of tourism in the region and protecting wildlife.
- Awards: Indira Gandhi NSS Programme Officer Award and State-level Best programme officer award

Azhagar Ramanujam was a professor of Tamil language and Head of the Tamil department at Government Arts College, Ooty and a National Service Scheme Programme Officer widely noted for social activities. As the National Service Scheme Programme Officer, he led and coordinated a volunteer team of students working in the region to create awareness among the people on various social issues including health, environment protection, improvement of tourism in the region and protecting wildlife. For his social services, he was awarded the Indira Gandhi NSS Programme Officer Award for the year 2009–2010.

== Social activities ==
Azhagar Ramanujam was leading a team of volunteers involved in various social activities in the Nilgiris district. He headed numerous campaigns against social evils and trained volunteers in effectively handling emergency situations. His other social activities include assisting forest staff in major wildlife sanctuaries to handle problems and helping the local populace in dealing with bush fires. He also works in the locale in spreading awareness about AIDS and other health issues, road safety, effect of intoxication in the younger population and the harmful effects of plastic items among various sections of the society.

He also actively involved himself in cultural programs like competitions for self-help groups, National Youth Day celebrations, workshops to improve tourism in the district, seminars on protection and preservation of monuments, World Book Day Celebrations and Wildlife Week celebrations etc. The volunteer team led by Azhagar Ramanujam conducted a procession along Commercial road and the Ooty Botanical Gardens and distributed handbills stressing on how breast cancer affects under-educated women and how smoking, chewing tobacco etc. affect men The procession was conducted to create awareness among the people about cancer. The volunteer team also conducted a camp at Mukurthi National Park to help protect wildlife, remove weeds and to prevent forest fires.

== Recognition ==
He was recognised for his social activities by being awarded the State-level Best programme officer award. He was awarded the Indira Gandhi NSS Programme Officer Award for the year 2009–2010 for his services to the Nilgiris district for the past many years. He was awarded by Pratik Prakashbapu Patil, Minister of State for Youth Affairs and Sports. He also has been recently awarded the C.M.A Award for his social services.

== See also ==
- Self-help group (finance)
- Ministry of Youth Affairs and Sports (India)
