= Charring Cross, Ooty =

Charring Cross
- Junction
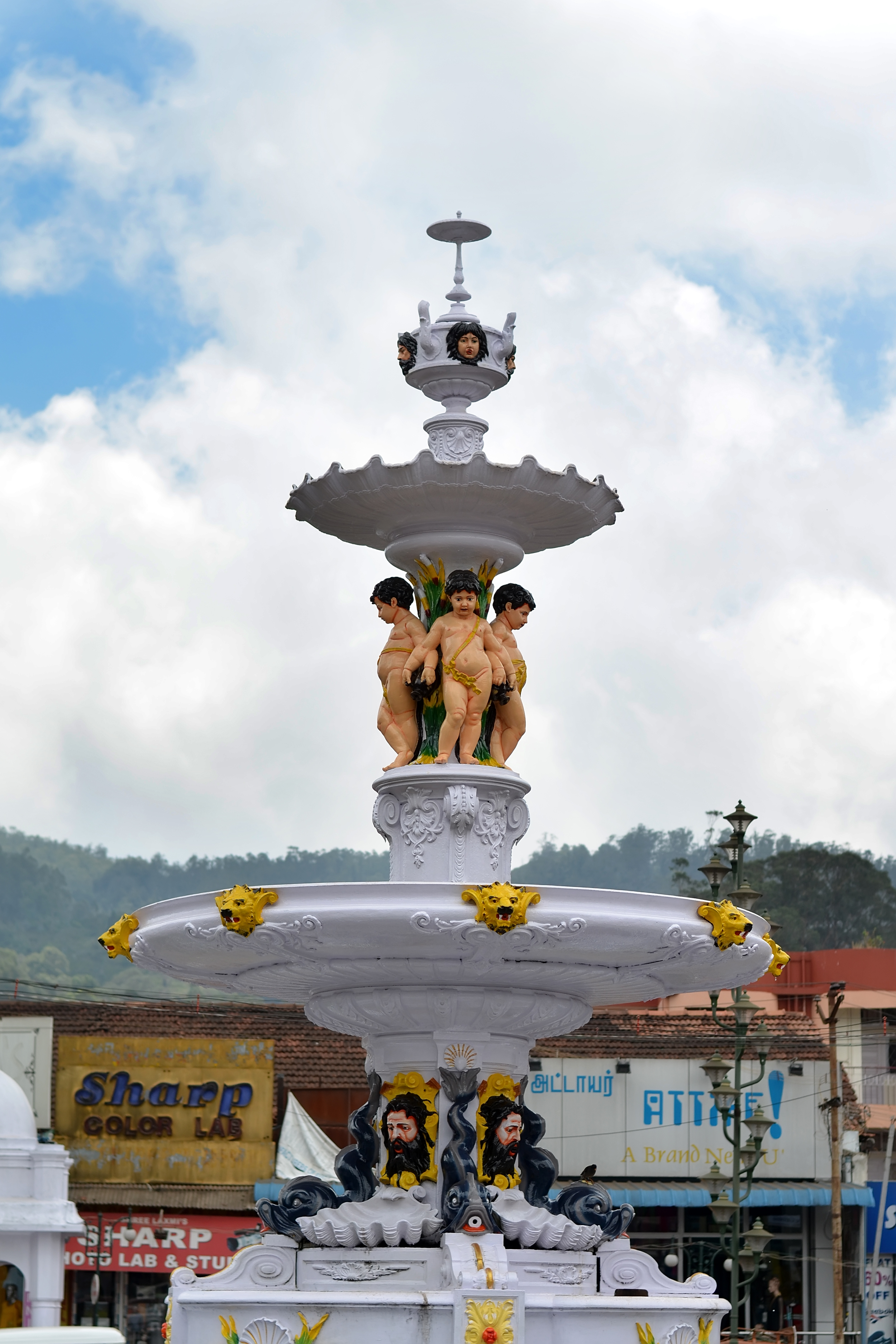
- Adams Fountain at Charring Cross, Ooty
- Country: India
- State: Tamil Nadu
- District: The Nilgiris

Government
  - Body: Udagamandalam Municipality Corporation
- Elevation: 2,400 m (7,900 ft)

Languages
  - Official: Tamil
- Time zone: UTC+5:30 (IST)
- PIN: 643 001
- Telephone code: 0423
- Vehicle registration: TN 43
- Civic agency: Udagamandalam Municipality Corporation
- Climate: Tropical wet (Köppen)
- Precipitation: 1,237 millimetres (48.7 in)
- Avg. annual temperature: 20 °C (68 °F)
- Temperature from Batchmates.com

Charring cross is a junction in National Highway 67 (India) intersecting the commercial road and the Ooty-Coonoor road in Ooty, Tamil Nadu. It is considered to be one of the most important and beautiful places in Ooty. The important landmark in charring cross is the Gandhi Statue.

== See also ==
- Government Rose Garden, Ooty
- Government Botanical Gardens, Udagamandalam
- Ooty Lake
- Ooty Golf Course
- Stone House, Ooty
- Ooty Radio Telescope
- Mariamman temple, Ooty
- St. Stephen's Church, Ooty
- Kamaraj Sagar Dam
