= Government Rose Garden =

Rose garden in Ooty, Tamil Nadu, India

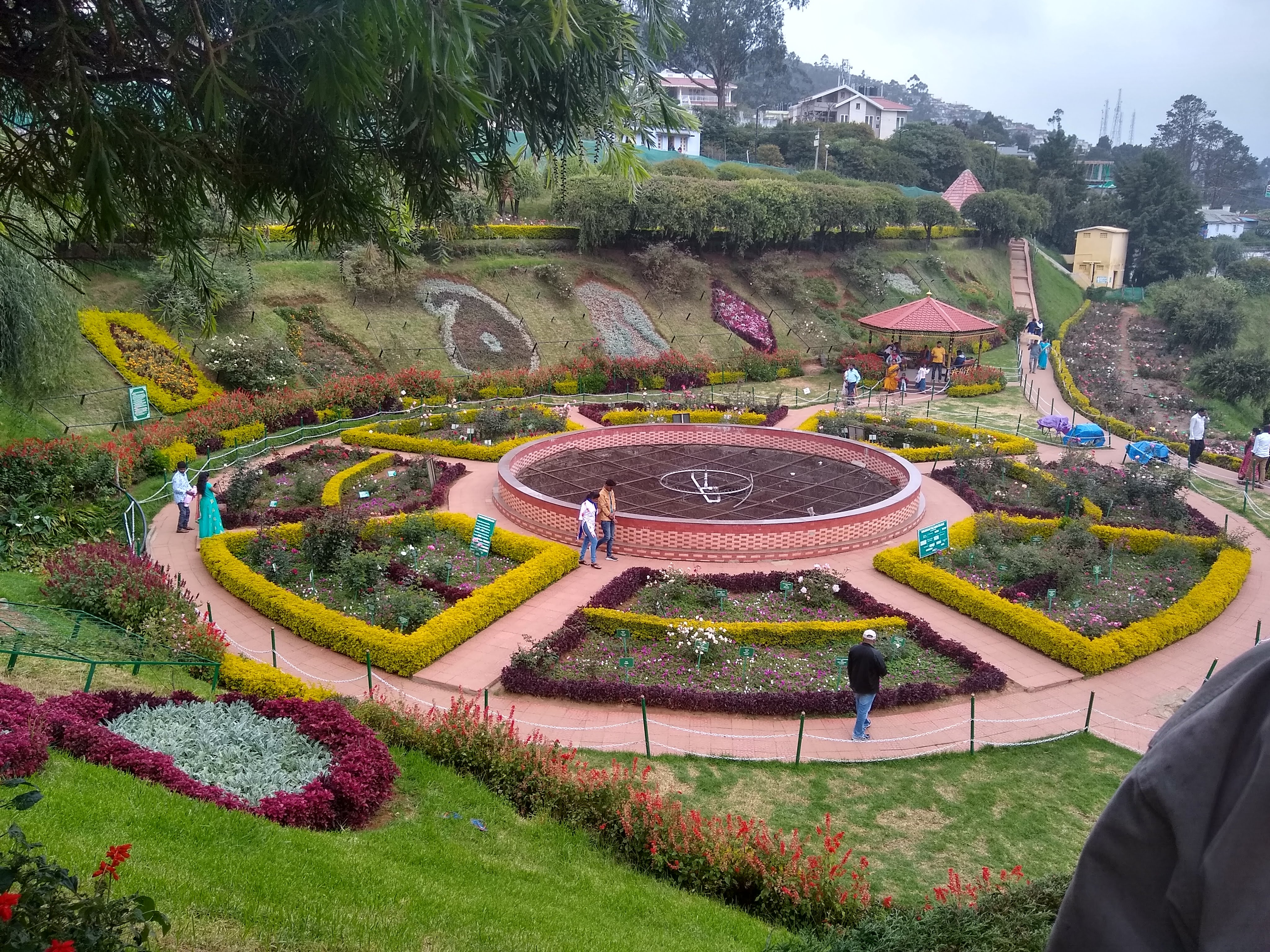
- Government Rose Garden
- Interactive map of Government Rose Garden
- Type: Botanical
- Location: Ooty, India
- Coordinates: 11°24′22″N 76°42′31″E
- Area: 4 hectares (9.9 acres)
- Opened: 20 May 1995
- Owner: Government of Tamil Nadu
- Species: 20000
- Collections: Hybrid tea roses, Miniature Roses, Polyanthas, Papagena, Floribunda, Ramblers, Yakimour

The Government Rose Garden (formerly known as the Jayalalithaa Rose Garden, Centenary Rose Park and Nootrandu Roja Poonga) is situated on the slopes of Elk Hill in Vijayanagaram of Ooty town in Tamil Nadu, India at an altitude of 2200 meters.

== Establishment ==
The Rose Park was established at Vijayanagaram in Ooty town to commemorate the Centenary Flower Show in the Government Botanical Gardens, Udagamandalam in May 1995. The flowers are arranged in five curving terraces covering four hectares. The garden is maintained by the Tamil Nadu Horticulture Department.

== Features ==
Ooty has a unique tropical mountain climate, hence the garden has the ideal climatic conditions for growing roses. Temperature variation is low and the rainfall distribution is uniform, which results in a long flowering season. The garden is visited by thousands of tourists throughout the year, even in winter when it is not the flowering season.

The Government Rose Garden located in the heart of Ooty is one of the largest rose gardens in India and also a popular tourist attraction. The garden is spread across 4 hectares of land and houses some of the largest collections of roses in the country including miniature roses, hybrid tea roses, floribunda, ramblers, black and green roses and many other unique varieties.

Initially, when the gardens were developed, 1,919 varieties of roses with 17,256 rose plants were planted. Today there are more than 20,000 varieties of roses of 2,800 cultivars. It is one of the largest collections of roses in India.

The collection of roses includes Miniature Roses, Ramblers, Hybrid Tea Roses, Yakimour, Polyanthas, Papagena, Floribunda and roses of unusual colours such as green and black. The varieties of rose plants planted here were assembled from different sources around the world.

The garden has been laid out with rose tunnels, pergolas and bowers with rose creepers. The slopes of the garden also features the Nila Maadam, an observation platform. From the Nila Maadam, tourists can observe the entire rose garden. The garden also features a statue of an angel amidst the roses.

Rose cultivation is a rewarding endeavor for both hobbyist gardeners and commercial growers. Known for their beauty and fragrance, roses thrive in various climates, including the hills and plains, with the right seasonal conditions, soil preparation, and care. This comprehensive guide will take you through each step of rose plantation, from selecting the optimal season to managing potential diseases.

== Recognition ==
The rose garden received the Garden of Excellence Award for being the best rose garden in south Asia, from the World Federation of Rose Societies in May 2006, in Osaka, Japan. This garden is one of the 35 gardens worldwide to have received this award.

== Gallery ==
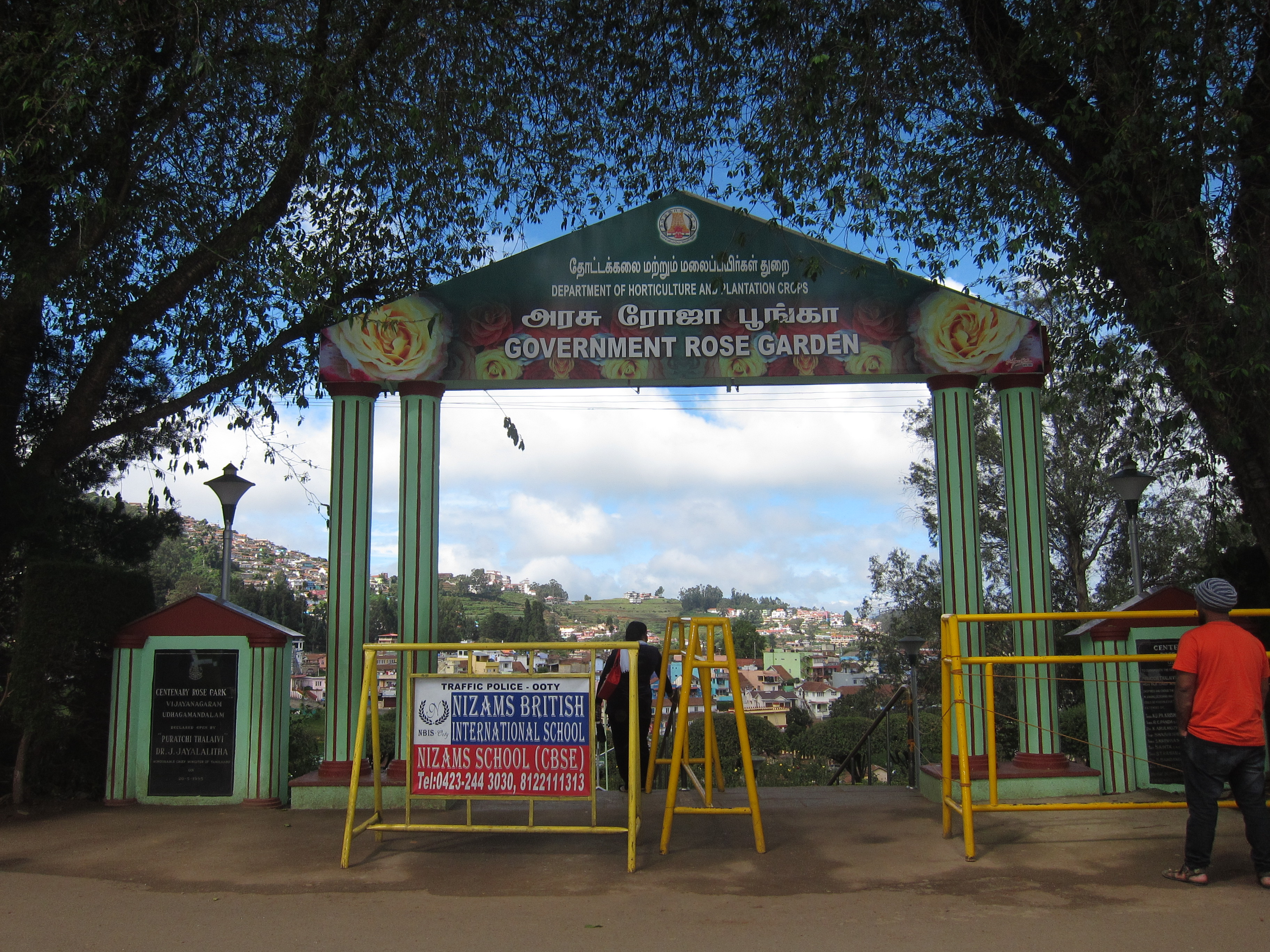
Entrance of Ooty Rose Garden

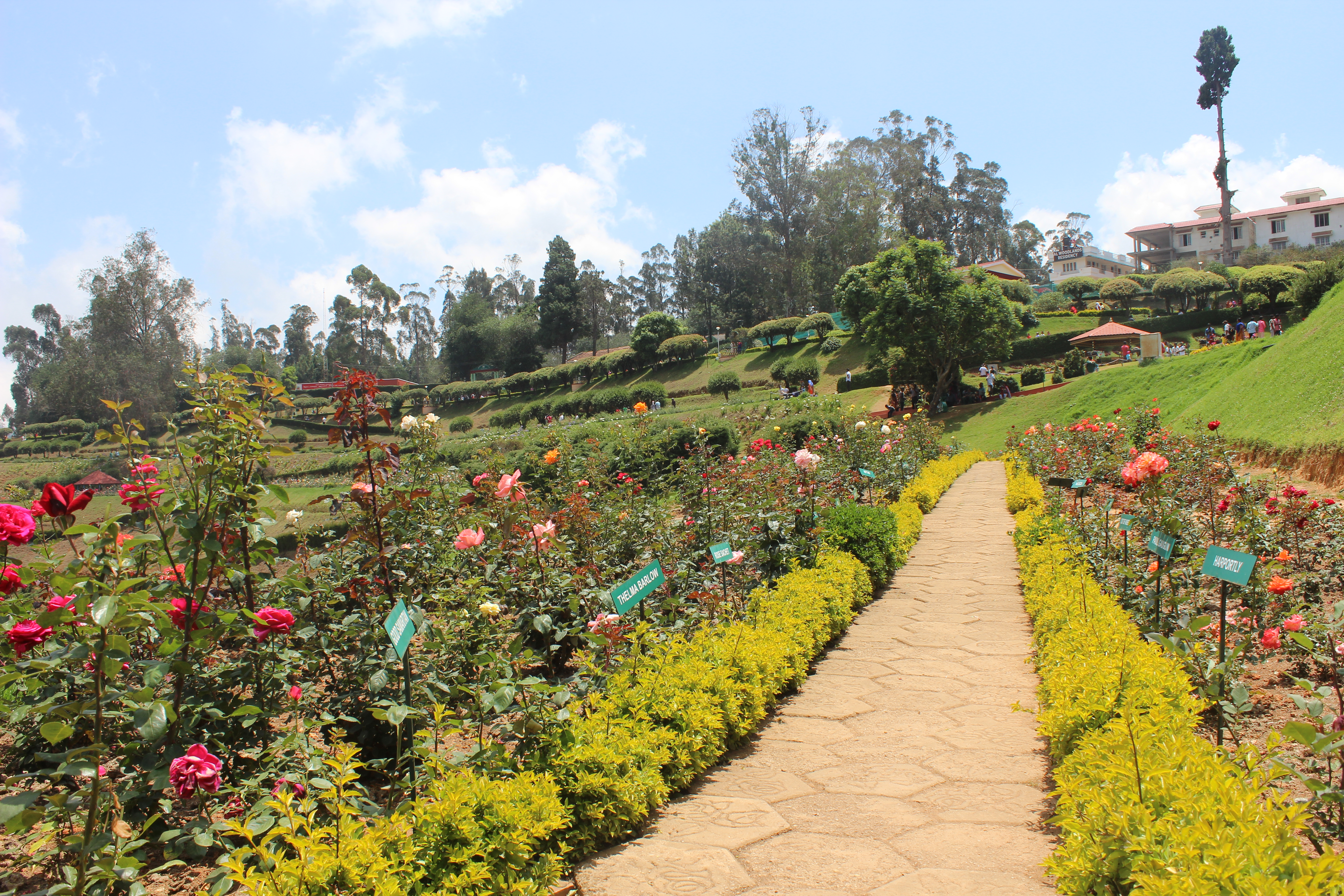
Rose Garden View in Ooty, Tamil Nadu.

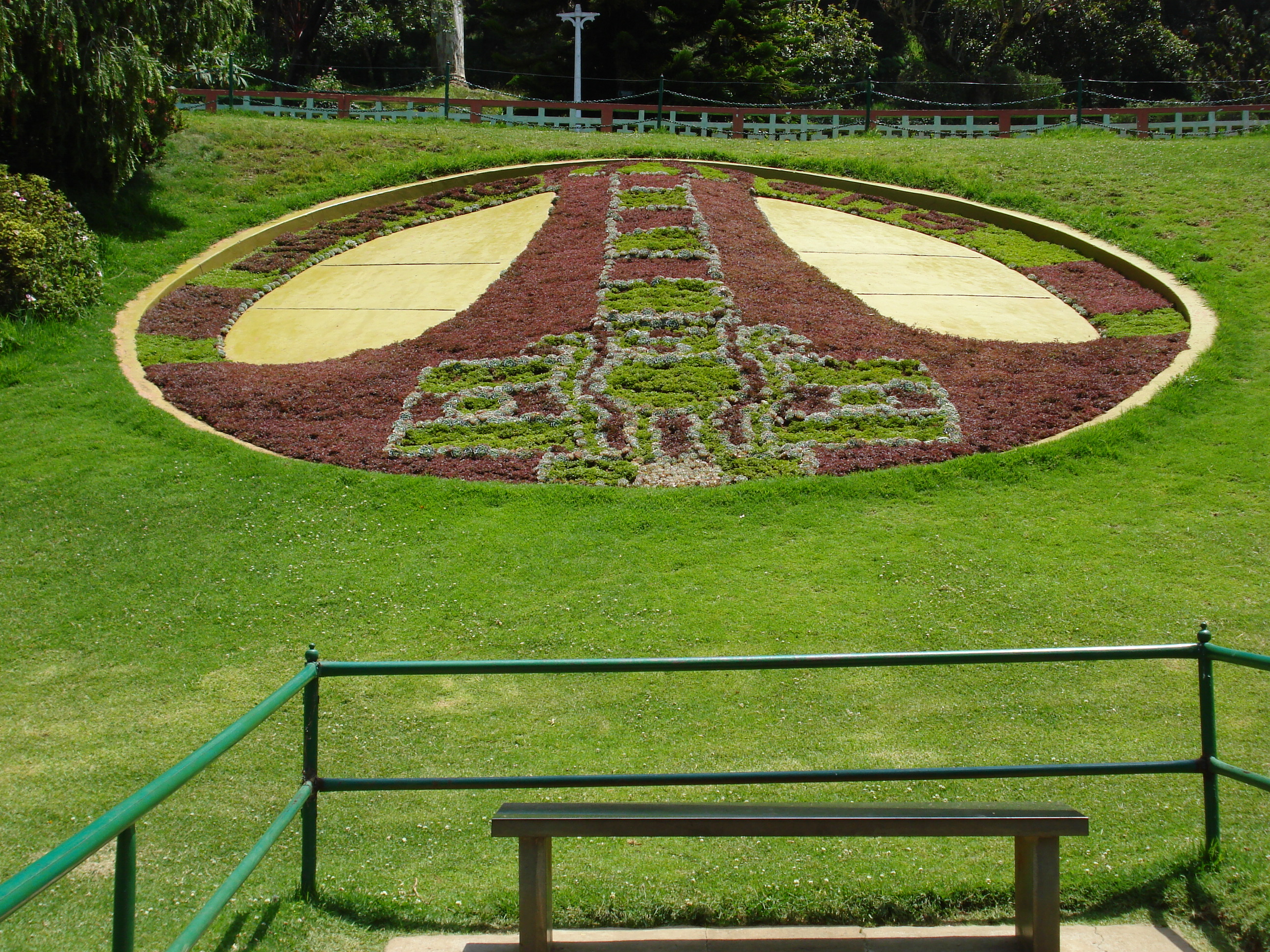
Government of Tamil Nadu emblem engraved in lawn at Rose Garden

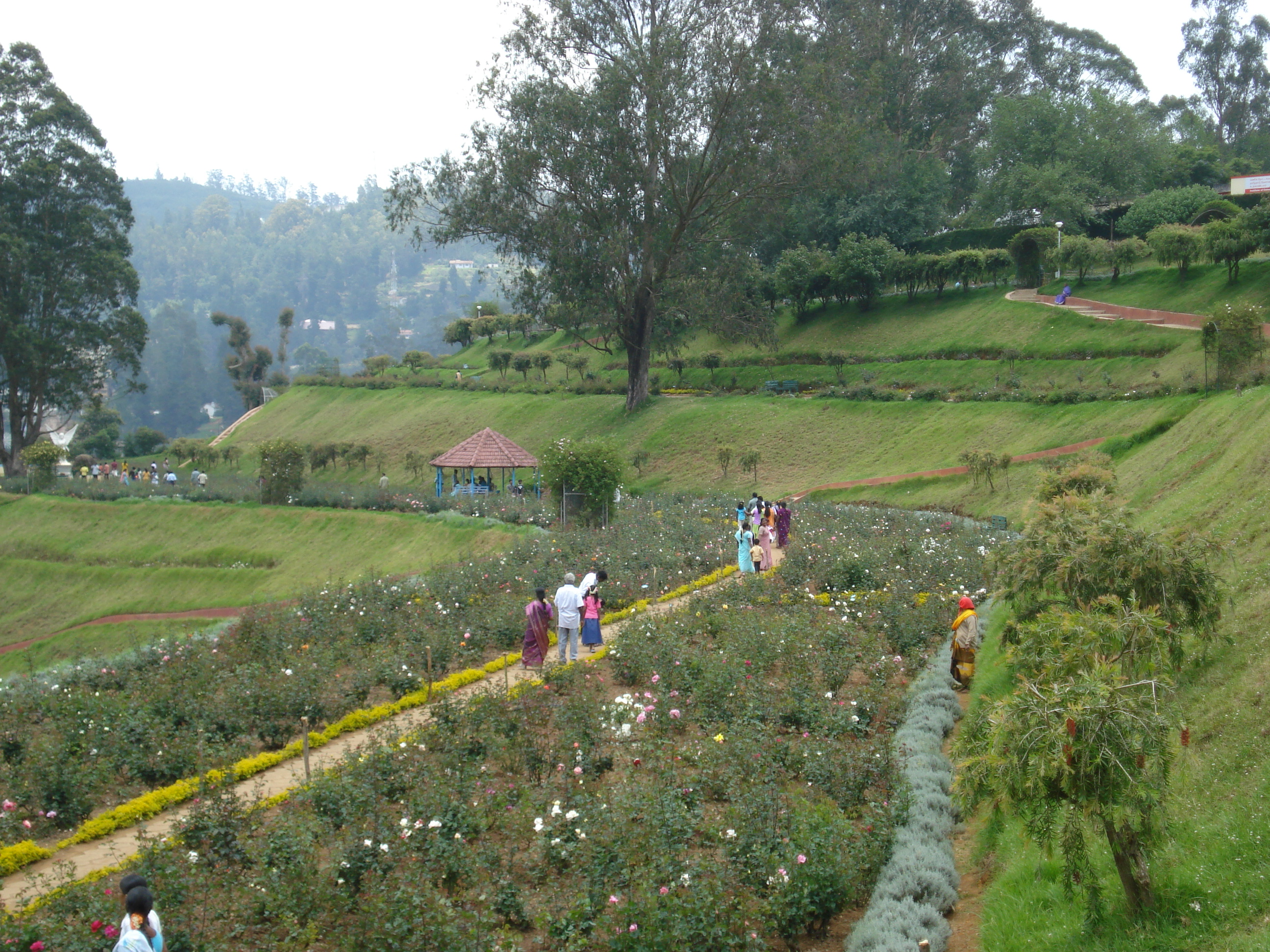
Landscape of roses planted in terraces

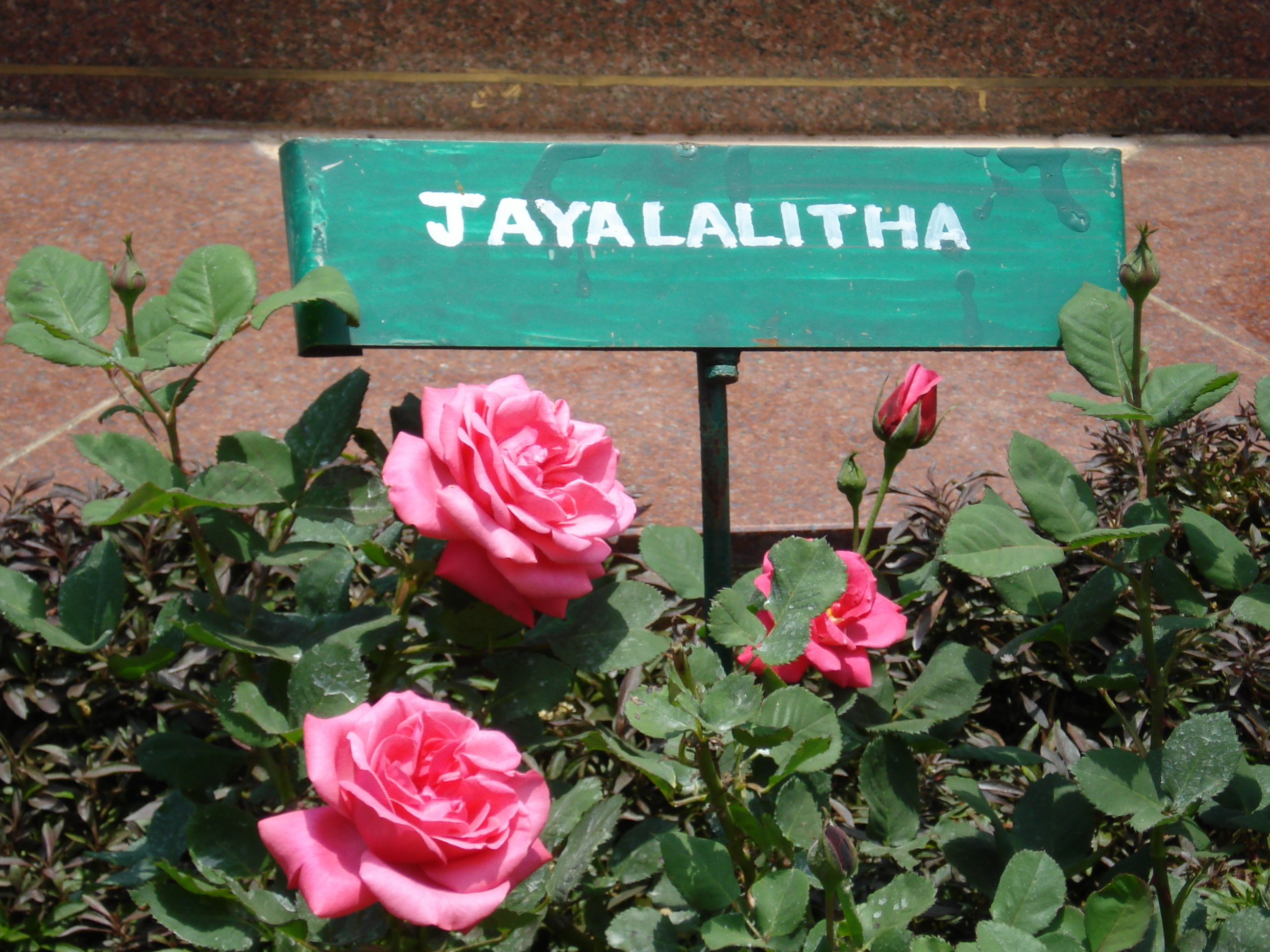
A rose variety named after Tamil Nadu Chief Minister J. Jayalalithaa

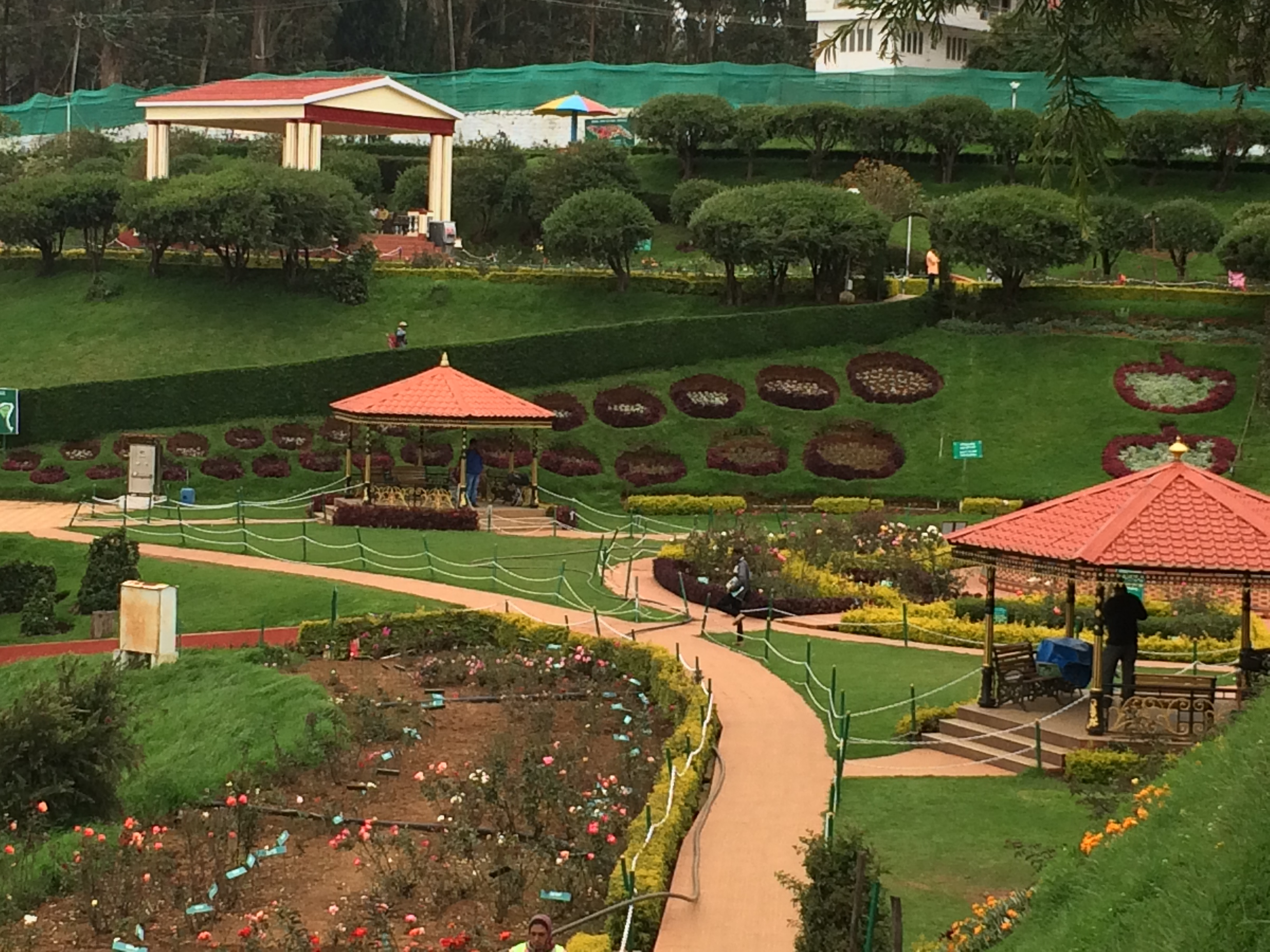

== See also ==
- Ooty Lake
- Stone House, Ooty
- Mariamman temple, Ooty
- Ooty Golf Course
- St. Stephen's Church, Ooty
