= Mariamman temple, Ooty =

Mariamman temple in Tamil Nadu, India

- மாரியம்மன் கோவில், உதகை
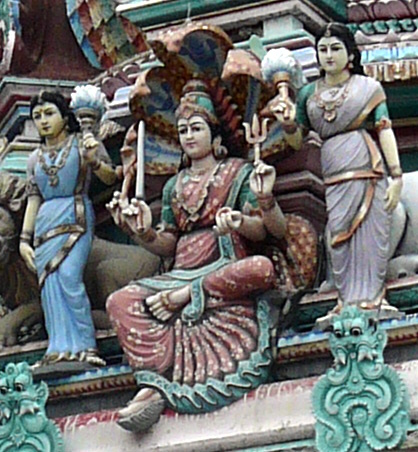
- Mariamman

Religion
- Affiliation: Hinduism
- District: Nilgiris
- Deity: Goddess Mariamman
- Festival: Ooty Mariamman Temple Festival

Location
- Location: Ooty
- State: Tamil Nadu
- Country: India
- Interactive map of Mariamman temple, Ooty
- Coordinates: 11.412142°N 76.712728°E

Architecture
- Type: Dravidian architecture

Specifications
- Temple: 1
- Elevation: 2,240 m (7,349 ft)

Website
- www.ootymariammantemple.com

The Mariamman temple (Tamil: மாரியம்மன் கோவில்) is located near the market in Ooty, in the state of Tamil Nadu, India. Mariamman is the local deity of the region. It is dedicated to Mariamman, the Hindu Goddess of rain.

== Legend ==
An incident is narrated related with the formation of this temple. According to it, every Tuesday merchants from Coimabatore came to this region to trade with the local tribals. On one of these days, two sisters travelling from north, reached the market. They had divine looks and manners. When they asked for a place to stay, they were told to stay under a nearby tree. They did not know that the sisters were Goddesses. A lightning or flash of light appeared near the tree and the sisters disappeared. Then the people understood that the sisters were divine forms and built a temple for Goddess Kaliamman and Mariamman together. It is the Mariamman temple seen today. It is the only place where both goddesses are seen together. Even today people gather at the market on Tuesdays and worship Goddess Mariamman on their way returning from the market.

== Temple Festival ==
Ooty Mariamman Temple Festival is celebrated in the month of April. Mariamman, the mother Goddess is widely considered to be a form of the goddess Kali. Mariamman is also referred to as Seethala Gowri or Mahamaayi. A festival honouring the goddess is held in the temple annually, which is visited by thousands of devotees from across the country. One of the important events in the festival includes devotees walking barefoot over burning coal to show their devotion to the goddess. The devotees also make oil lamps from grounded rice and offer them to the goddess.

== See also ==
- Ooty Lake
- Stone House, Ooty
- Ooty Golf Course
- St. Stephen's Church, Ooty
