= Stone House, Ooty =

Structure in Ooty, India

Stone House
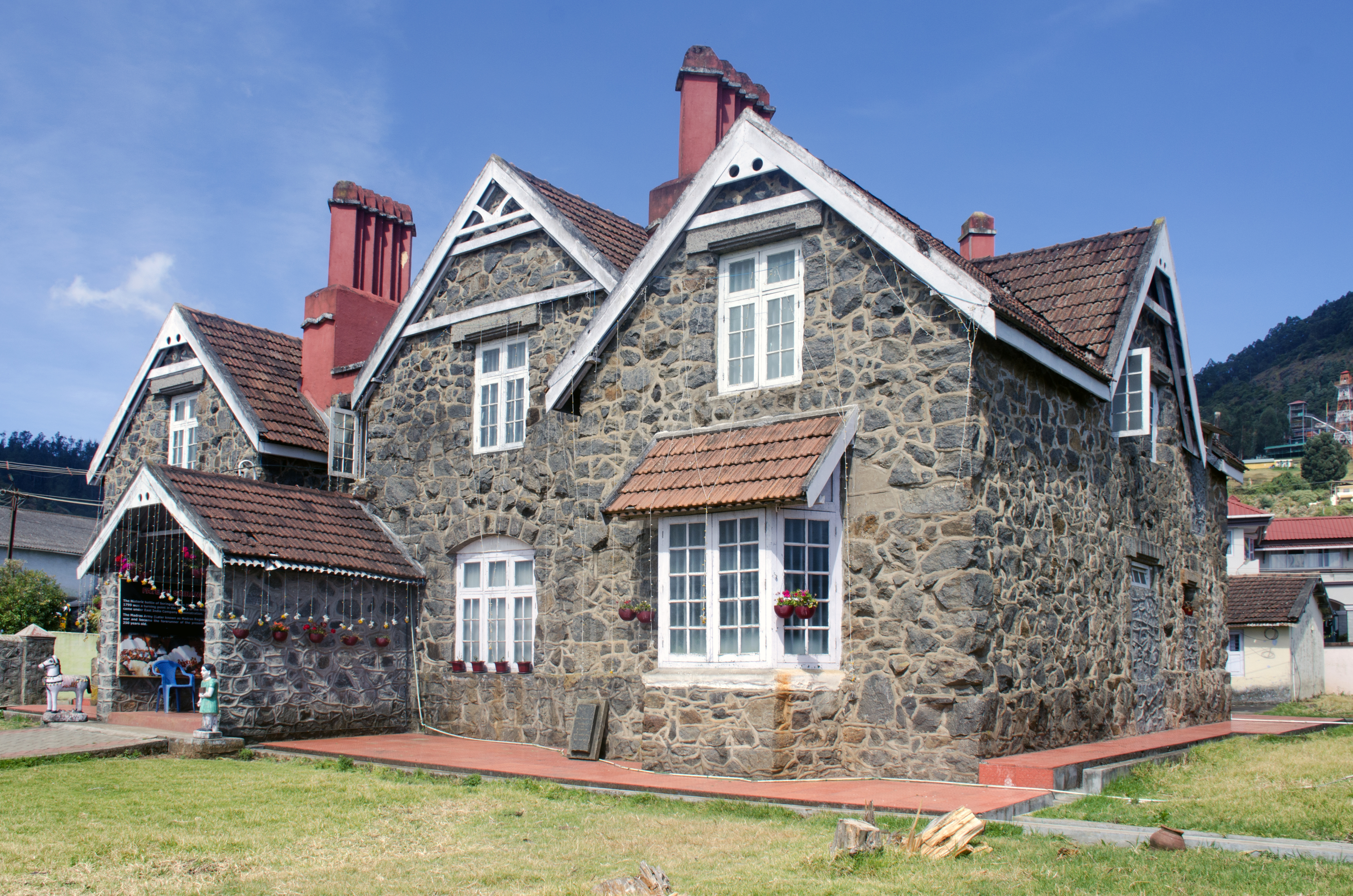
- Stone House, Ooty
- Interactive map of the Stone House area
- Former names: Kal Bangala

General information
- Architectural style: European
- Location: Ooty, Tamil Nadu,, India
- Coordinates: 11.412142°N 76.712728°E
- Elevation: 2,240 m (7,350 ft)
- Construction started: 1822
- Owner: Government of Tamil Nadu

Stone House was the first bungalow constructed in Ooty, India. It was built by John Sullivan and was called Kal Bangala by the tribals (Kal means stone in Tamil). Today, it is the official residence of the Principal of the Government Arts College, Ooty. The tree in front of the bungalow is known as the Sullivan's oak.

== History ==
John Sullivan started building Stonehouse in 1822. He acquired land from the Toda people at ₹1 (equivalent to ₹690 or US$7.20 in 2023) an acre.

== See also ==
- Ooty Lake
- Mariamman temple, Ooty
- Ooty Golf Course
- St. Stephen's Church, Ooty
