= Ooty Lake =

Artificial lake in Tamil Nadu, India

- ஊட்டி ஏரி (Tamil)
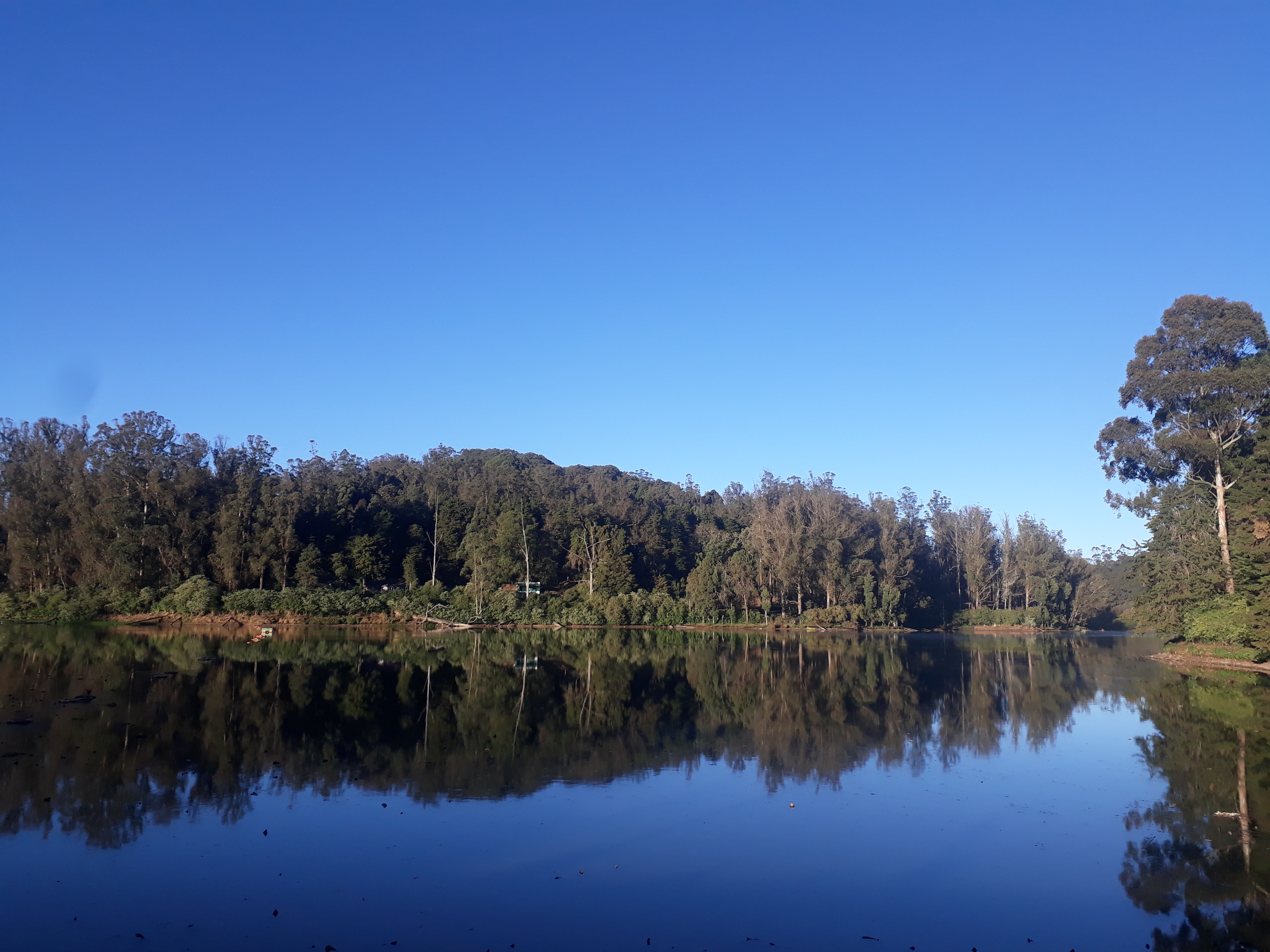
- Ooty Lake

- Location within Tamil Nadu
- Location: Ooty, Tamil Nadu, India
- Coordinates: 11.4061°N 76.6882°E
- Lake type: Artificial lake
- Basin countries: India
- Max. length: 2.5 km (1.6 mi)
- Max. width: 140 m (460 ft)
- Surface area: 3.885 km^{2} (1.500 sq mi)
- Surface elevation: 2,220 m (7,280 ft)
- Settlements: Ooty

Ooty lake is an artificial lake near Ooty in the Nilgiris district of Tamil Nadu, India. It covers an area of 26 hectares (64 acres). The boathouse on the lake is a major tourist attraction.

== History ==
Ooty Lake is an artificial lake constructed by John Sullivan in 1824. The water flowing down mountain streams in the Ooty valley was dammed to form the lake. The lake became empty on three occasions when it breached its bund. Originally, the lake was intended to be used for fishing, with ferries being used to travel across the lake. It gradually shrunk from its original size, giving place to the current bus stand, race course and the lake park. The Tamil Nadu Tourism Development Corporation, on behalf of the Tourism Department, took possession of the lake in 1973 to provide boating facilities as a tourist attraction.

== Features ==
The lake is surrounded by groves of Eucalyptus trees with a railway line running along one shore. During the summer season in May, boat races and boat pageantry are organised for two days.

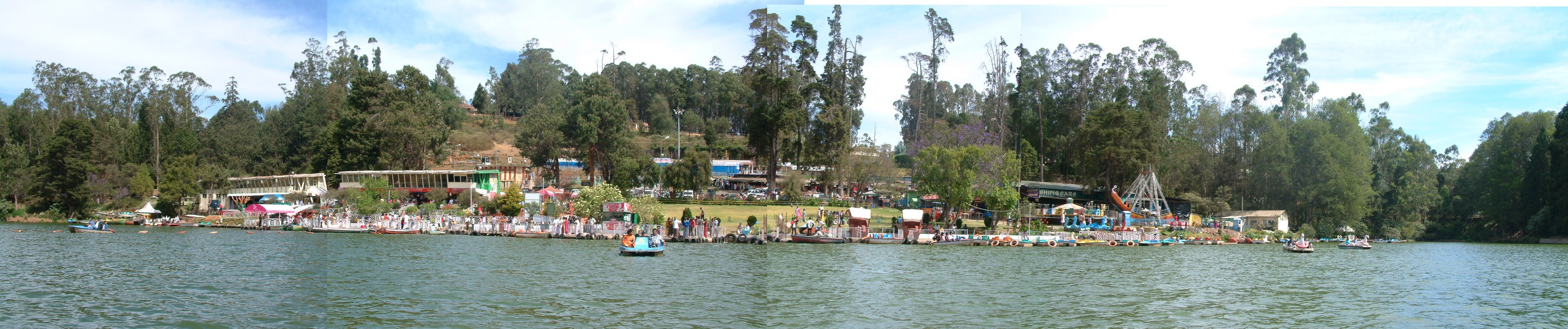

== Boat house ==
The boat house, which adjoins the lake, was opened by the Tamil Nadu Tourism Development Corporation (TTDC). Boating is the prime attraction at the lake. The boat house offers boating facilities with paddle boats, row boats, and motorboats. It also features a garden, a mini-train, and an amusement park. Other notable features include a canteen run by the TTDC and pony rides in front of the boat house.

Fun activities inside Ooty Lake include a mini-train (especially for kids), a 7D cinema, horror and mirror house, dashing car, break-dance, and Columbus ride.

Other things to do nearby Ooty Lake include horse rides and cycling.

== Setbacks ==
The lake has had continuous problems with rapidly proliferating weeds (water hyacinth). The officials of the Public Works Department (PWD), have been continually working to clean the lake of the weeds. According to a study conducted by Tamil Nadu Pollution Control Board, Ooty lake is the most polluted water body in the state and its water is not fit for potable purposes.

== See also ==
- Stone House, Ooty
- Mariamman temple, Ooty
- Ooty Golf Course
- St. Stephen's Church, Ooty
- Doddabetta (12km)
- Botanical Garden (3km)
- Rose Garden (3.9km)
- Thread Garden (Opposite to Boat House)
- Thunder World (1 km)
