= Southwick, Ooty =

Southwick
- Suburb
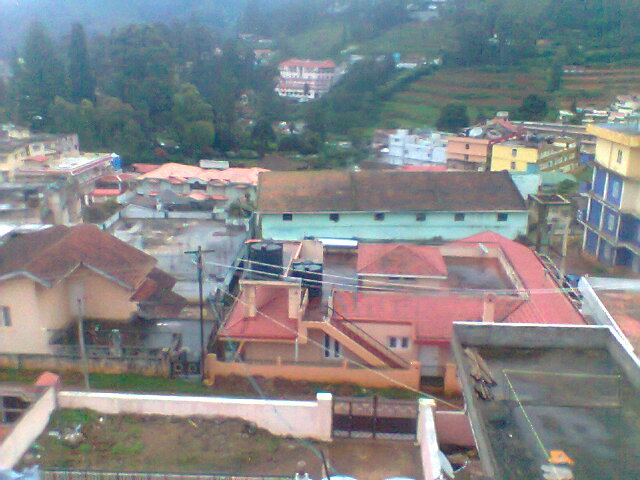
- Mountain view in Southwick

- Location in Tamil Nadu, India
- Coordinates: 11.404457°N 76.712843°E
- Country: India
- State: Tamil Nadu
- District: The Nilgiris

Government
  - Body: Udagamandalam Municipality Corporation
- Elevation: 2,400 m (7,900 ft)

Languages
  - Official: Tamil
- Time zone: UTC+5:30 (IST)
- PIN: 643 001
- Telephone code: 91423
- Vehicle registration: TN 43
- Civic agency: Udagamandalam Municipality Corporation
- Climate: Tropical wet (Köppen)
- Precipitation: 1,237 millimetres (48.7 in)
- Avg. annual temperature: 20 °C (68 °F)
- Temperature from Batchmates.com

Southwick is a suburb in Ooty town. It is located on the NH 67 road from Ooty to Coonoor at about 3 km from the bus stand in Ooty. The suburb falls within the Ooty municipality in Tamil Nadu, India. It has derived its name from the Southwick Bungalow in the suburb.

== Establishments ==
=== Government organisations ===
Nilgiris District Co-Operative Milk Producers' Union Limited: This union was established on 14 July 1946. It has members throughout the district, from whom it collects milk and supplies it to customers. The establishment also has a cheese manufacturing facility within the premises.

Nehru Yuva Kendra: Nehru Yuva Kendra Sangathan (NYKS) is an autonomous organization under the Ministry of Youth Affairs and Sports of the Government of India. The organisation has youth clubs which undergo training and education. The other activities of the youth club include sports, adventure programmes, entrepreneurship development, self-employment, awareness generation, skill development etc.

=== Private Establishments ===
- Wax World: Wax world is a wax museum and art gallery, which has life size statues of wax which demonstrates Indian history, heritage and culture. The wax statues are displayed in a 142-year-old bungalow.
- The Eye Foundation
- DCIS

TANSI Watch Assembly Unit: This watch assembly unit was incorporated in the year 1978. It began to assemble watches from 1 August 1978. The required raw materials are supplied by the Hindustan Machine Tools (H.M.T).

=== List of Hotels in Southwick ===
- Hotel Blue Bird
- Hotel Pebrock Heritage Inn
- Hotel Moti Manor
- Silver Oaks Cottages
- Hotel Orchid Inn

== Image gallery ==
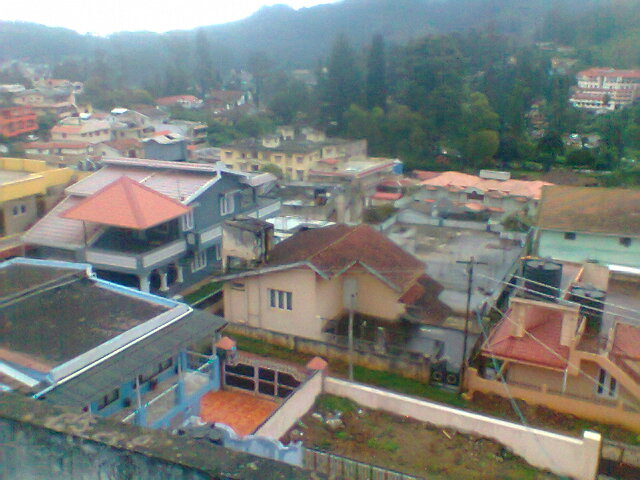

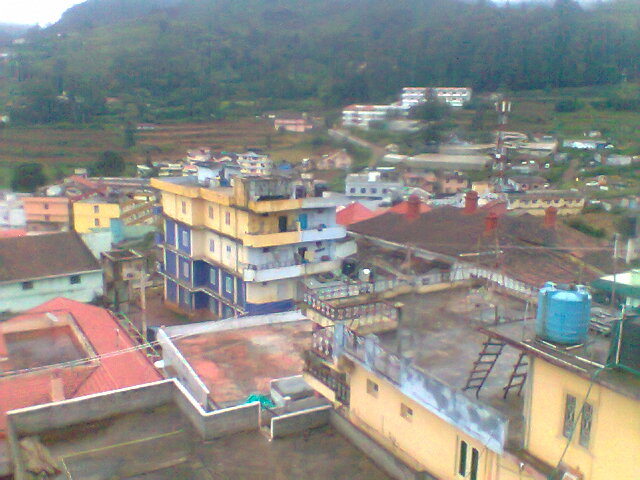

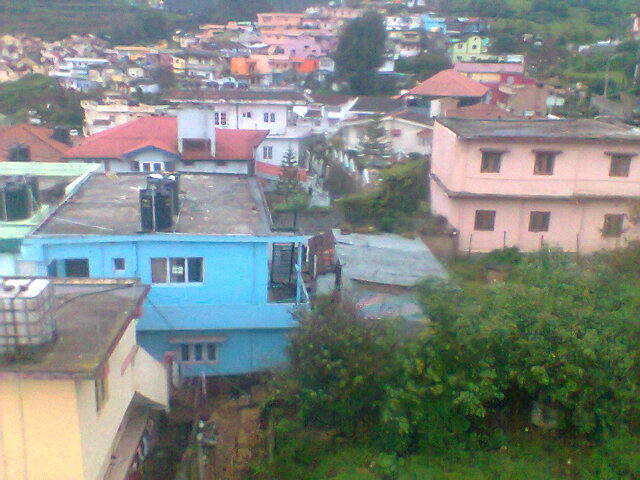

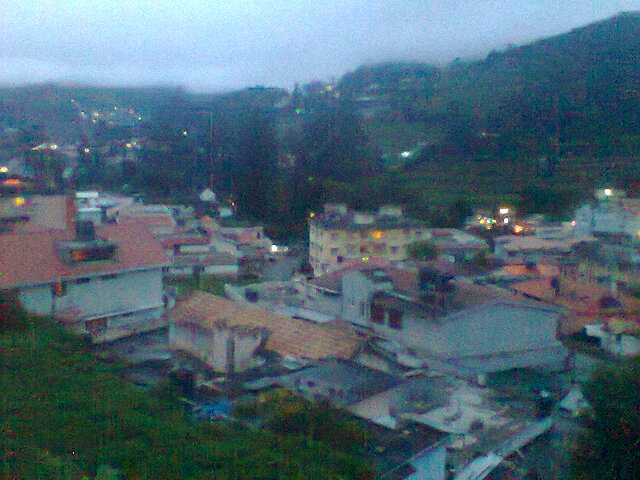

== See also ==
- Government Botanical Gardens, Udagamandalam
- Government Rose Garden, Ooty
- Kamaraj Sagar Dam
- Mariamman temple, Ooty
- Ooty Golf Course
- Ooty Lake
- Ooty Radio Telescope
- St. Stephen's Church, Ooty
- Stone House, Ooty
