= Glenmorgan, Nilgiris =

Glenmorgan Glenmorgan
- Village
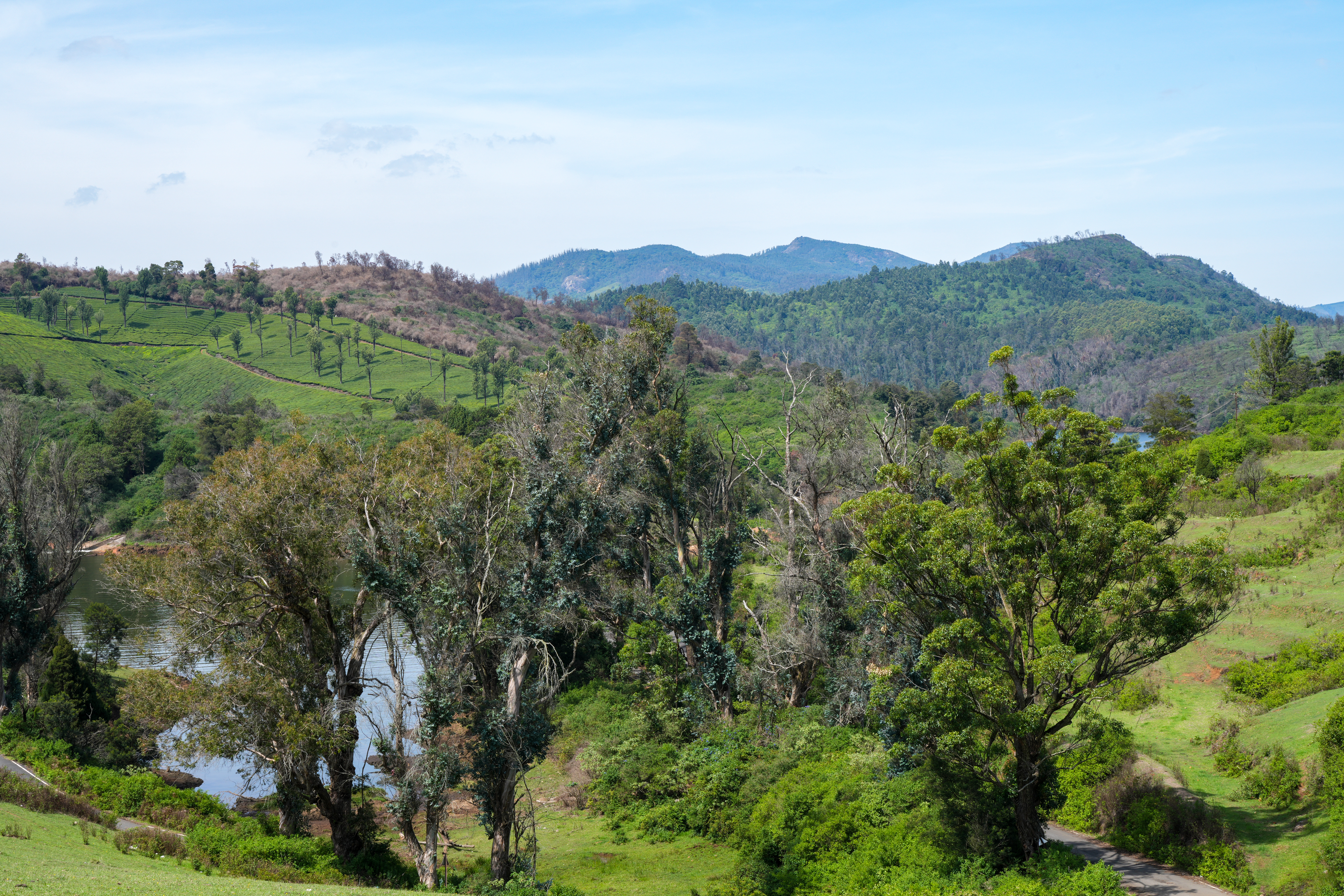
- Reservoir, tea fields and forests in Glenmorgan

- Location in Tamil Nadu, India
- Coordinates: 11.49950°N 76.60917°E
- Country: India
- State: Tamil Nadu
- District: Nilgiris

Government
  - Body: Udagamandalam Municipality Corporation
- Elevation: 2,400 m (7,900 ft)

Languages
  - Official: Tamil
- Time zone: UTC+5:30 (IST)
- PIN: 643 001
- Telephone code: 91423
- Vehicle registration: TN 43
- Civic agency: Udagamandalam Municipality Corporation
- Climate: Tropical wet (Köppen)
- Precipitation: 1,237 millimetres (48.7 in)
- Avg. annual temperature: 20 °C (68 °F)
- Temperature from Batchmates.com

Glenmorgan is a village located at a distance of 25 kilometers from Ooty. This place is known for its tea estates which includes one of the oldest tea estates in the region known as the Glenmorgan tea estate. The Pykara power house is located near the Glenmorgan estate, for which a lake at the foot of the estate forms the fore bay.

== Ropeway ==
One of the attractions here is a 3-kilometre (1.9 mi) rope way from a power house in Singara to Glenmorgan. The ropeway has an inclination of nearly 41° for 300 metres (980 ft) near a stretch called the German Point making the ascent and descent through it difficult. For the purpose of accommodating Electricity Board officials and tourists, rest houses are available at both ends of the ropeway.

== Tourist attraction ==
Glenmorgan is used as a picnic spot by tourists and offers panoramic views of the Mudumalai National Park, Mysore, the Moyar valley and the power house at Singara. Presently tourists are not allowed and it seems the rope car is not operated.

== See also ==
- Government Rose Garden, Ooty
- Government Botanical Gardens, Udagamandalam
- Ooty Lake
- Ooty Golf Course
- Stone House, Ooty
- Ooty Radio Telescope
- Mariamman temple, Ooty
- St. Stephen's Church, Ooty
- Kamaraj Sagar Dam
