= Southwick Bungalow =

19th-century building in Southwick, a suburb in Ooty, Tamil Nadu, India

Southwick bungalow is a 19th-century building in Southwick, a suburb in Ooty, Tamil Nadu, India. It was built by the British during their colonization period in India. The residents of this bungalow are Javid Sait and Matheen Sait, sons of the late Yoonus Sait,Late Abdul Sattar Sait(Son of Fakir Mohammed Sait) Fakir Mohammed Sait and Ismail Sait Grandsons of Late Fakir Mohammed Sait(Son of H M EBRAHIM SAIT) living in chennai,Omer Sait, and Mohsin Sait, sons of the late Razzack Sait; Zubair Sait, Suhail Sait, Saad Sait, Abrar Sait, sons of the late Ahmed Sait; Junaid Sait, son of the late Ali Sait, and Rafiq Sait, son of the late Cassim Sait. Their forefathers, who had been living in the bungalow since the 1870s, were collectors of antique items and businessmen with ventures that existed during the British Raj. The present generation deals mostly in the hospitality industry with Junaid Sait running multiple resorts and Saad and Suhail running hotels. The antiquities acquired for the bungalow are many and lie in an area of 15.5 acres within the bungalow. A collection of strongboxes hold treasures, unknown to outsiders. Junaid Sait recalls

Somewhere in there is a bowl from the king of Afghanistan that changes colour when poisoned food is put into it

The other artifacts in the bungalow include intricate ivory carvings, an Edison concert phonogram, Inlaid tables, screens, collection of keychains, matchboxes, stamps, coins and stuffed animals. Another remarkable antique is a billiard table which was imported into India by Dawson & Co. and was the second table in the world on which the game of snooker was played, the game being invented on the table in the Ooty Club. Another remarkable feature of this beautiful ancient bungalow is the nearly 200-year-old tea tree which stands in one of the lawns of the bungalow.

== See also ==
- Mariamman temple, Ooty
- Ooty Golf Course
- Ooty Lake
- St. Stephen's Church, Ooty
- Stone House, Ooty
