= Emerald Lake (Ooty) =

Lake in Tamil Nadu, India

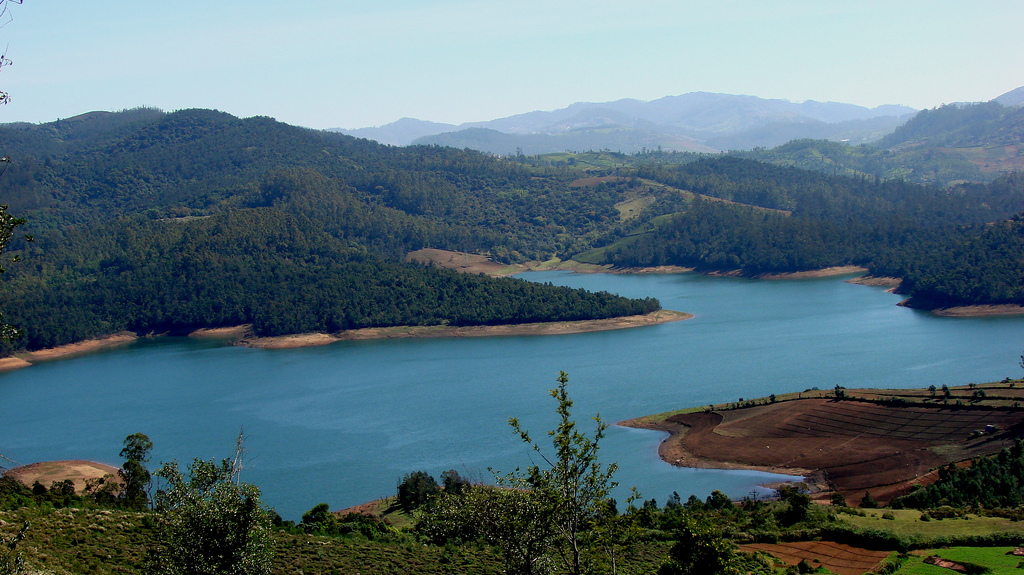
- The Emerald Lake

- Location within Tamil Nadu
- Location: The Nilgiris, Tamil Nadu
- Coordinates: 11.328°N 76.619°E
- Frozen: No
- Islands: No

Emerald Lake is located near Emerald village in the Nilgiris district in Tamil Nadu, India. It is located in a region called the silent valley, about 25 kilometers from the Ooty town.

== Tourism ==
The lake is an important tourist and picnic spot in the region. The lake is famous for a variety of fish in the lake and birds in the locale. It is also notable for the scenic sun rise and sun set views near the lake. The lake is surrounded by tea plantations where visitors can buy tea products.

== See also ==
- Ooty Lake
- Kamaraj Sagar Dam
- Adam's fountain
- Valley View, Ooty
- Avalanche Lake, Ooty
- Government Botanical Garden
