= Nilgiri Mountains =

Mountain range in Tamil Nadu, India

Coordinates: 11.375°N 76.75833°E

- Tamil: [n̪iːlɐɡiɾi], English: /ˈniːlɡɪri/
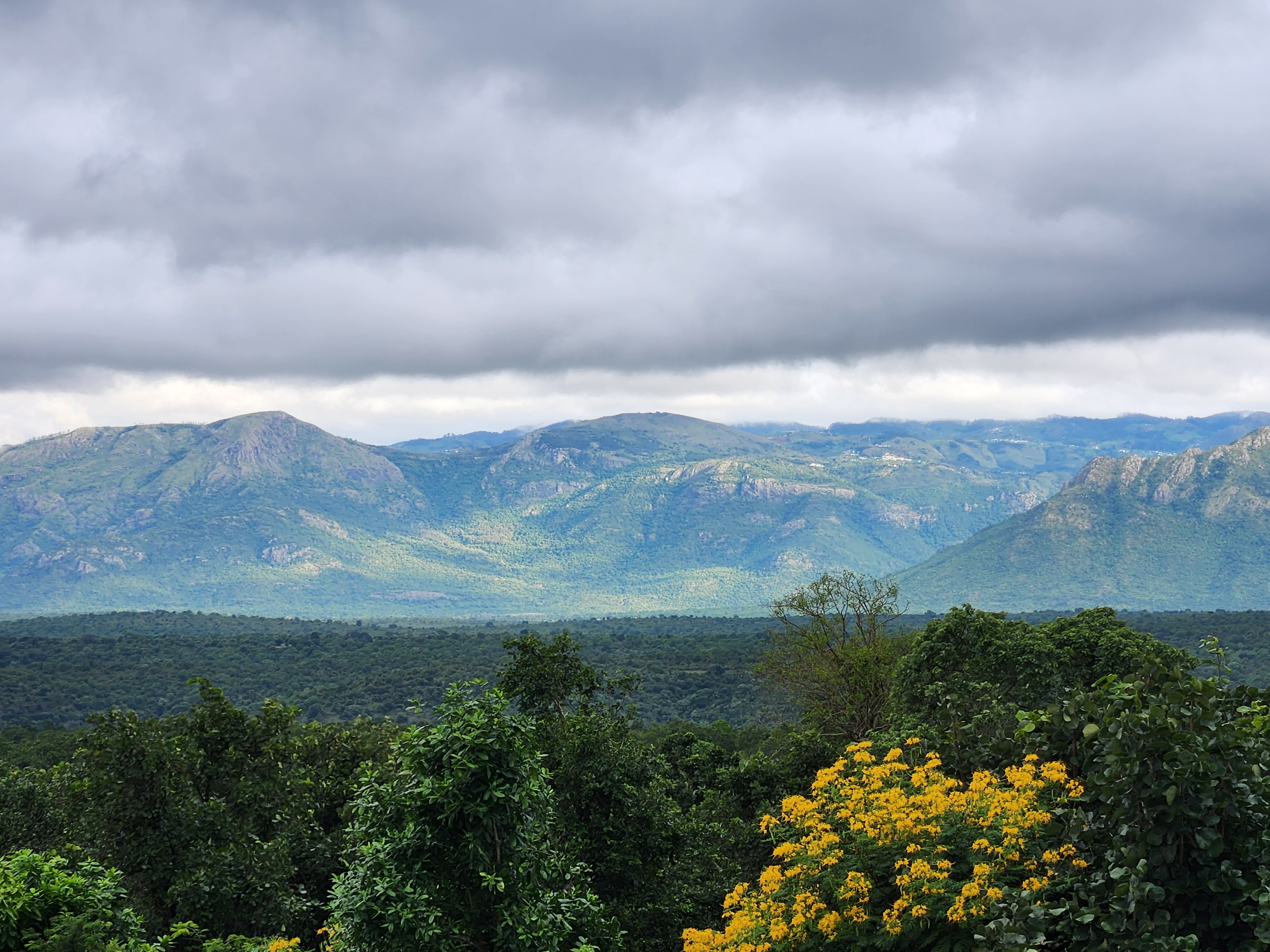
- Nilgiri Mountains

Highest point
- Peak: Doddabetta, Tamil Nadu
- Elevation: 2,637 m (8,652 ft)

Naming
- English translation: Blue Mountains

Geography
- Location: Karnataka, Kerala, Tamil Nadu
- Parent range: Western Ghats

Geology
- Rock age(s): Archean Eon, 3000 to 500 mya
- Mountain type: Fault

The Nilgiri Mountains, also known as the Nilgiris, are a mountain range at the junction of the Eastern and Western Ghats ranges in South India. Spanning the states of Tamil Nadu, Karnataka, and Kerala, the range forms part of a 56 km (35 mi)-long and 32 km (20 mi)-wide plateau. The mountains are bounded by the Moyar River to the north, the Wayanad Plateau to the west, the Coimbatore plains to the east, and the Bhavani River and Palakkad Gap to the south. The range has an average elevation of 2,000 m (6,600 ft), with Doddabetta being the highest at 2,637 m (8,652 ft). Several rivers and streams drain the mountains, forming numerous waterfalls along their course.

The name Nilgiri, meaning "Blue Mountains" in Sanskrit, is associated with the kurinji flower, which once gave the hills a bluish hue. Archaeological evidence indicates that the region has been inhabited since prehistoric times. The Nilgiris have long been home to indigenous communities such as the Badagas, Todas, Kotas, Irulas and Kurumbas. Although the region came under the influence of several dynasties that ruled over South India, it remained relatively isolated until the eighteenth century, when it became part of the Kingdom of Mysore before passing to the British East India Company. During the nineteenth century, the British developed infrastructure in the Nilgiris. Ooty became a principal hill station, and subsequently became the summer headquarters of the Madras Presidency. The completion of the Nilgiri Mountain Railway in 1899 further improved connectivity, and the Nilgiris District was established in 1868 to administer the region.

In the 20th century, conservation efforts were undertaken in the Nilgiri Mountains, and several protected areas were established. The Nilgiris forms part of the Nilgiri Biosphere Reserve, the country's first biosphere reserve, and was included in UNESCO's World Network of Biosphere Reserves in 2000 in recognition of its biodiversity and ecological importance. The mountains experience a temperate climate, and supports a wide variety of vegetation. The vegetation includes tropical evergreen forests on the western slopes, and deciduous forests on the eastern slopes and at lower altitudes. The native vegetation consisted of grasslands interspersed with shola forests at high altitudes, which were threatened by introduced species and plantations in the 19th century. The region has several animal and bird species, including several endemic species.

== Etymology ==
The word Nilgiri is derived from the Sanskrit words nīla (blue) and giri (mountain). The name is attributed to the Kurunji flower, which used to give the slopes a bluish tinge.

== History ==
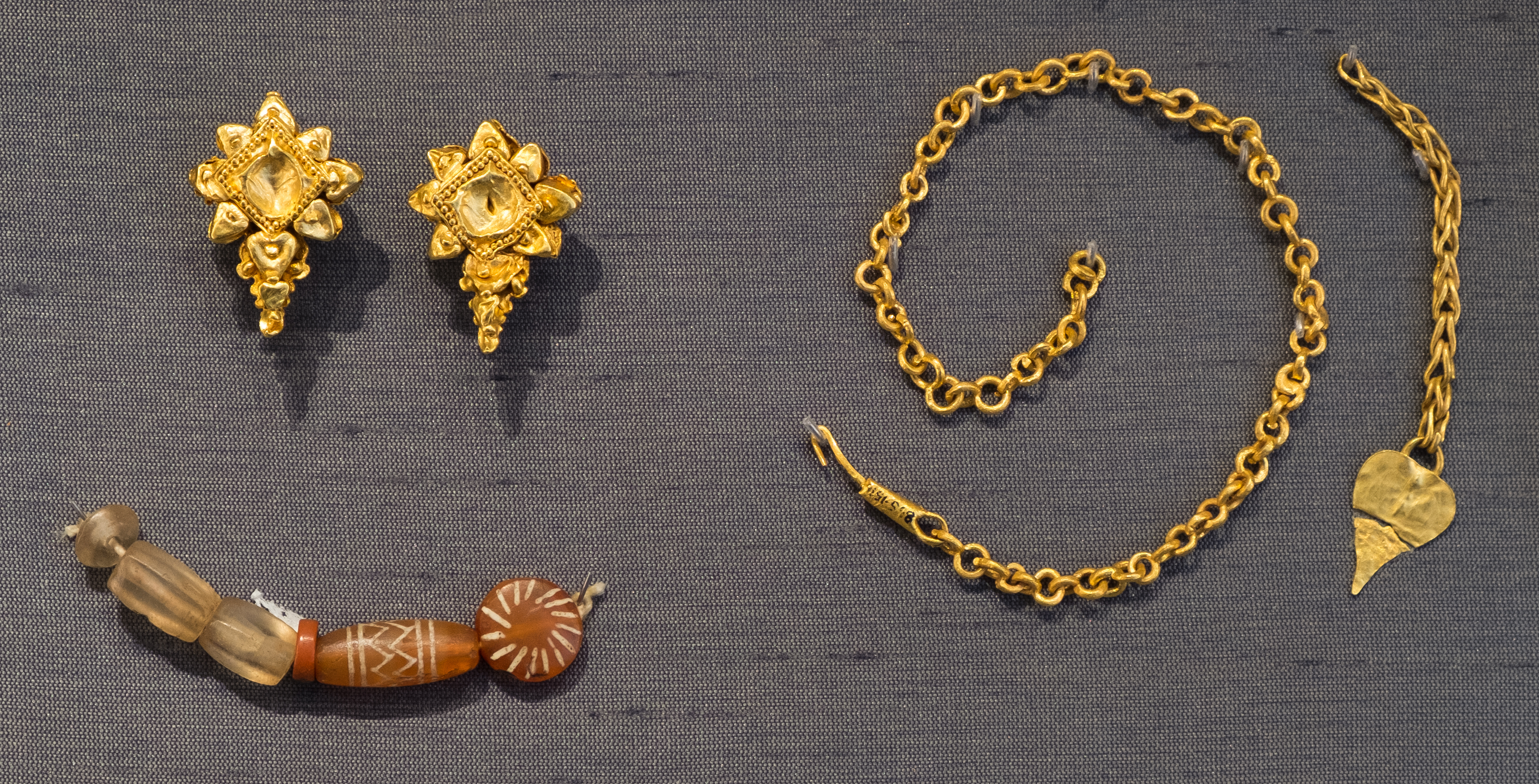
Gold jewelry and etched carnelian beads, Nilgiri Hills culture, 1st millennium CE, British Museum

Archeological evidence indicates that the Nilgiri Mountains have been inhabited since prehistoric times, with several such artifacts housed in the British Museum. Later excavations have discovered several cairns and dolmens along the higher ridges in the Nilgiri plateau. Sculpted hero stones, probably from a different era, have been found on the lower reaches and mountain passes.

The earliest literary reference to the Nilgiri Mountains is found in the Tamil Sangam epic Cilappatikaram from the 5th or 6th century CE. The Nilgiri Mountains have been traditionally inhabited by various hill people such as the Badagas, Todas, Kotas, Irulas and Kurumbas. The region was ruled by the three Tamil kingdoms of Cheras, Cholas and Pandyas during various times. While it later formed part of the territory ruled by various dynasties like the Pallavas, Satavahanas, Gangas, Kadambas, Rashtrakutas, Hoysalas and the Vijayanagara Empire, the region remained relatively isolated until the eighteenth century, when it came under the influence of the Kingdom of Mysore. Following the Anglo-Mysore Wars, the Nilgiris came under the suzerainty of the East India Company administration and were later incorporated into the Coimbatore District of the Madras Presidency.

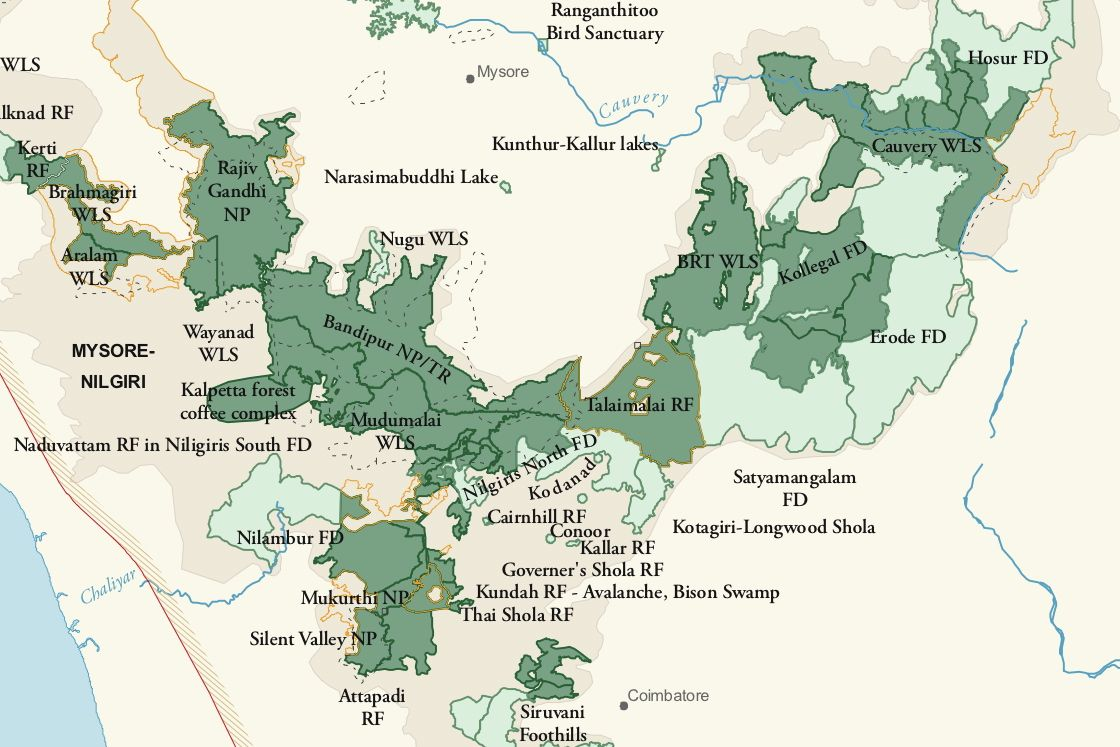
Map of the Nilgiri Biosphere Reserve

During the early nineteenth century, British interest in the Nilgiris increased because of its cool climate and suitability as a sanatorium. In 1814, as part of the Great Trigonometrical Survey, an exploration team extensively mapped the region. In 1819, John Sullivan, then Collector of Coimbatore, visited the hills and promoted their development as a European settlement. The British developed Ooty, and constructed roads and administrative facilities, transforming the settlement into a hill station. Later, Ooty became the summer headquarters of the Madras Government in 1870. During the late nineteenth century, the British introduced commercial tea plantations in the Nilgiris. As per Edgar Thurston, in the mid 19th century, the British shipped Chinese convicts from Straits Settlements to be jailed in India, who later settled in the Nilgiri mountains. In August 1868, the Nilgiris District, which encompassed the mountainous regions, was carved out of the erstwhile Coimbatore district. The Nilgiri Mountain Railway was completed in 1899.

In the 20th century, conservation efforts were undertaken in the Nilgiri Mountains, and several protected areas were established. Established in 1940, the Mudumalai Wildlife Sanctuary was one of the earliest wildlife sanctuaries in the country. The Nilgiri Biosphere Reserve was established in 1986 by the Government of India as the country's first biosphere reserve, and was included in UNESCO's World Network of Biosphere Reserves in 2000 in recognition of its biodiversity and ecological importance.

== Geography ==
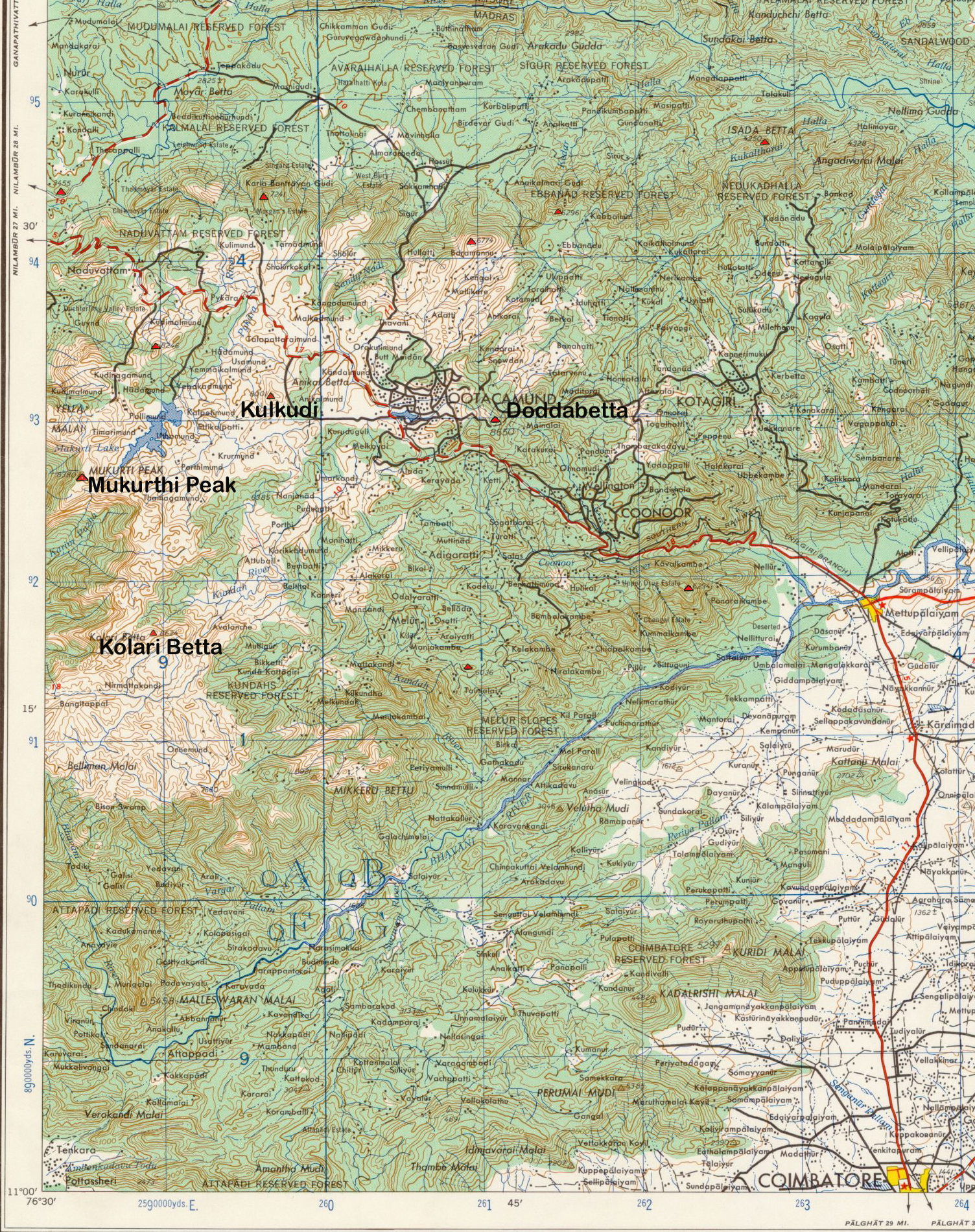
Topographic map of Nilgiri Hills showing some peaks

Nilgiri Mountains form part of a raised plateau, stretching 56 km (35 miles) long and 32 km (20 miles) wide, at the junction of the Eastern and Western Ghats mountain ranges. Spread across the Indian states of Tamil Nadu, Karnataka, and Kerala, it is separated from the Anaimalai and Palani Hills in the south by the Bhavani River and the Palakkad Gap, and from the Karnataka Plateau in the north by the Moyar River, a tributary of Bhavani. The Wayanad plateau, which is the extension of the Karnataka plateau, forms the western side of the Mountains, while it is bound by the plains of Coimbatore on the eastern side.

The plateau was traditionally sub-divided into four distinct regions–Peranganad in the east, Todanad in the north, Merkunad in the west, and the Kundah range in the south-west. The mountains rise steeply from the plains, and have an average elevation of 6,500 ft (2,000 m). The range runs roughly north–south and is divided almost in two by a series of peaks, of which the highest point is Doddabetta at 8,640 ft (2,630 m). Doddabetta, along with the peaks of Club Hill, Elk Hill, and Snowden surround the valley in which Ooty is situated. The altitude decreases towards the east, with Devashola at 7,417 ft (2,261 m) being the most prominent peak. The altitudes are higher on the western side, which houses Kudikadu and Kolaribetta peaks, the second and third highest peaks in the Nilgiris respectively.

== Hydrography and climate ==
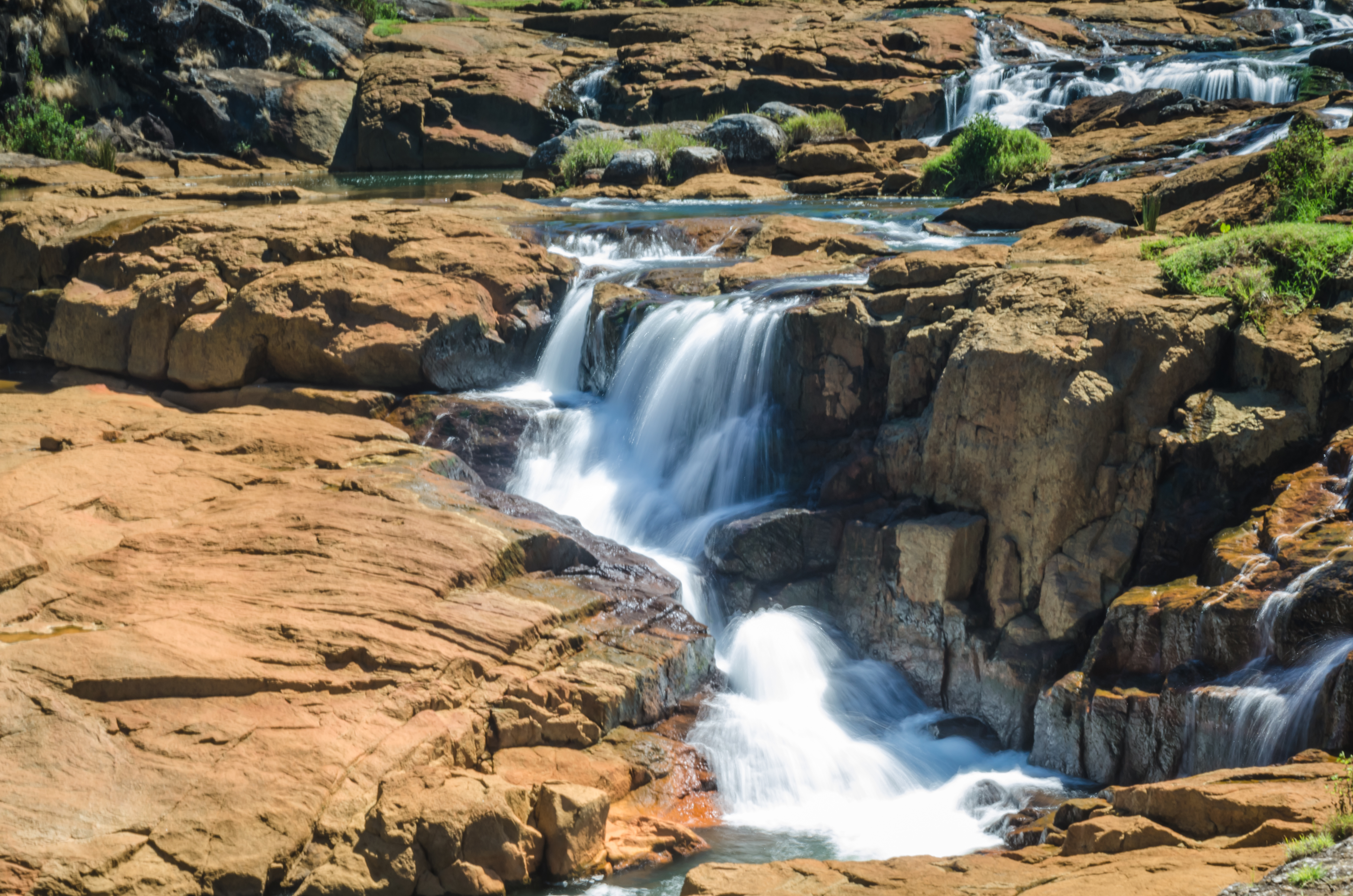
Pykara Falls

There are numerous streams and rivers that drain the Nilgiri Mountains. Most of the smaller streams either drain into the Bhavani or its tributary, the Moyar. The Pykara rises at Mukurthi peak and flows through a series of cascades, with the last two falls of 55 metres (180 ft) and 61 metres (200 ft) known as Pykara falls, before joining the Moyar. Sigur River rises from the slopes above Ooty, and forms the 170 ft (52 m)-high Kalhatti Falls.

The Gathada hulla stream forms the 250 ft (76 m)-high Catherine Falls, before joining the Coonoor River, which drains the slopes of Coonoor. The Karteri River joins the Coonoor River, before flowing into the Kallar River, which is one of the tributaries of the Bhavani. The Kundah and Kulakamby are other major streams, which join the Bhavani River at the foothills of the Nilgiri Mountains. The Kulakamby River forms the 400 ft (120 m)-high Kullakamby Fall, the highest waterfall in the Nilgiris. Ooty Lake is an artificial lake covering 65 acres (26 ha) created in 1824. Emerald Lake and Avalanche Lake are other lakes in the region.

Despite lying close to the Equator, the Nilgiris have a temperate climate due to its high altitude. December to February are generally cold and dry, with January being the coldest month, and temperatures begin to rise in March. Though April and May are the hottest months of the year, isolated rainfall results in the appearance of newer vegetation. The south-west monsoon brings rainfall from June to August, and the shorter north-east monsoon brings some rainfall in October and November, with a drier September in between. Nilgiris have an equable climate, with the average minimum temperature in April being nine degrees higher than the average minimum in January, and the average maximum in January seven degrees below the average maximum in April.

== Flora and fauna ==
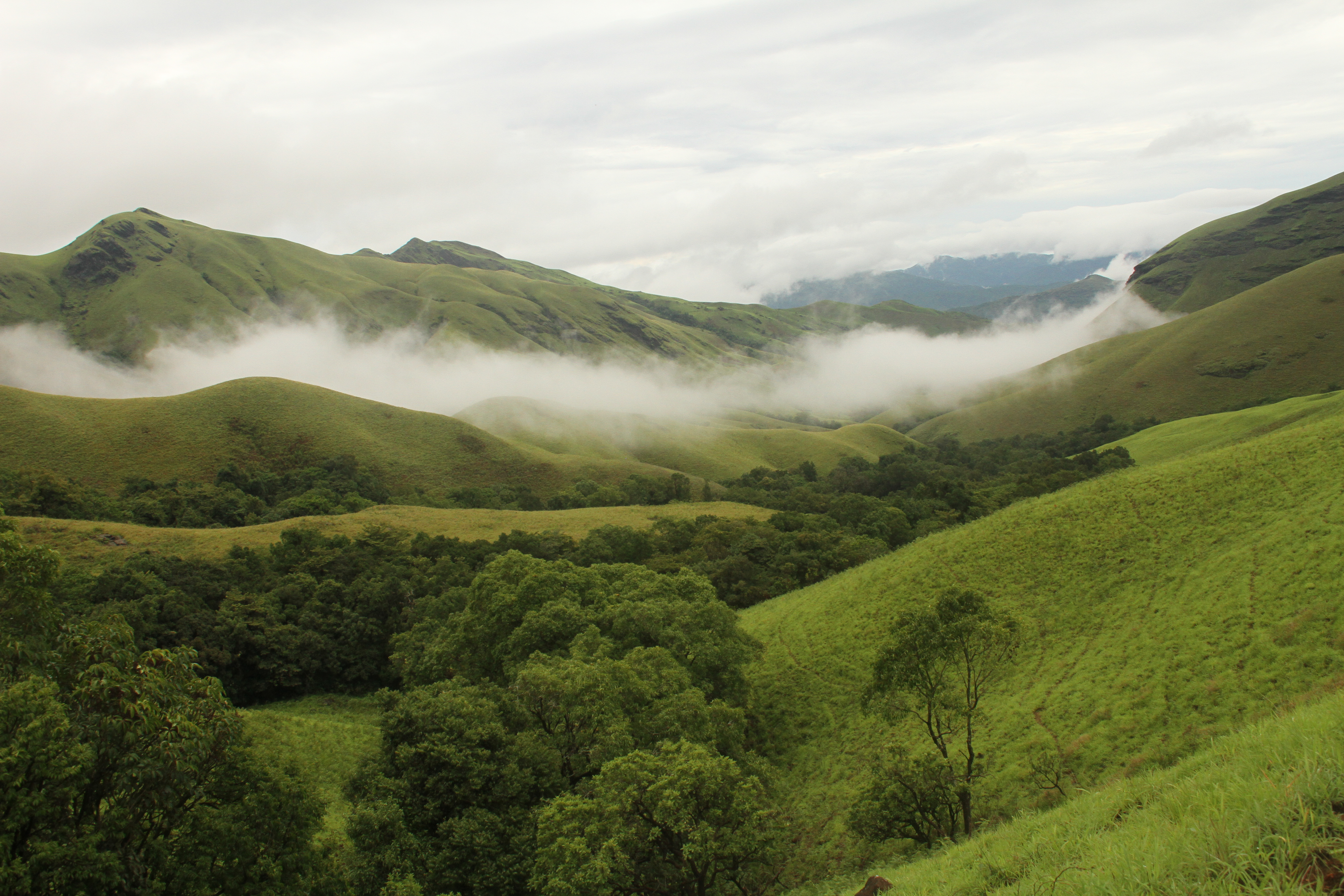
Grasslands interspersed with shola

The Nilgiris form part of the Nilgiri Biosphere Reserve, established in 1986. The western slopes of the Nilgiri Mountains, which receive high rainfall, are covered by dense evergreen forests. These moist forests exist at altitudes of 3,000–4,000 ft (910–1,220 m), and consist of 200–250 ft (61–76 m)-high trees covered by lichens, mosses, and epiphytes. The drier eastern and lower slopes are covered by deciduous forests. At high altitudes, the native vegetation consisted of meadows and grasslands on the hillsides with shola forests, a type of stunted evergreen forest, in the valleys. In the 19th century, the British introduced invasive species such as pine, wattle and eucalyptus and established tea plantations. These later became the dominant species in the mountains replacing the native vegetation. Nilgiris forms part of the South Western Ghats montane rain forests ecoregion.

The Nilgiri Biosphere Reserve harbours about 3700 plant species including medicinal plants. These include several endangered and endemic species such as Youngia nilgiriensis, Impatiens neo-barnesii, Impatiens nilagirica, Euonymus angulatus and Euonymus serratifolius.

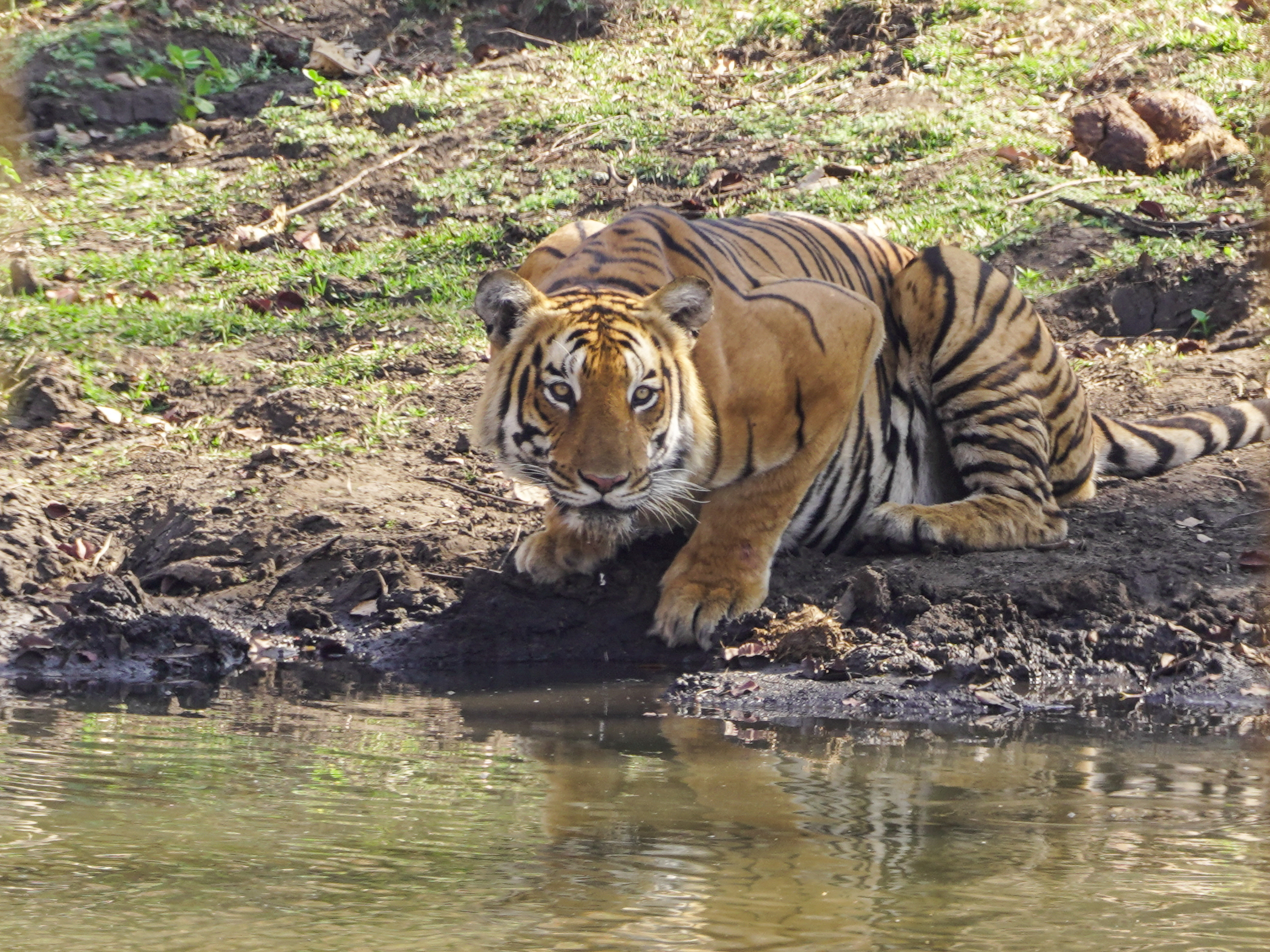
A Bengal tiger in Mudumalai

The Nilgiris biosphere is home to more than 684 vertebrate species including 156 endemic species. The region has one of the largest Bengal tiger populations, and the protected regions of Nilgiris form part of Project Tiger. The Indian elephant is the largest mammal in the region, and hosts a few of the elephant corridors identified as part of Project Elephant. Nilgiri tahr is an endangered ungulate that is endemic to the Nilgiris and is the state animal of Tamil Nadu. It is also home to mammals like the Indian leopard, chital deer, gaur, sambar deer, Indian boar, sloth bear, and four-horned antelope. Primates include the endemic lion-tailed macaque, and Nilgiri langur.

There are several species of birds including hornbills, parakeets, bulbuls, kingfishers, babblers, warblers, pigeons, and raptors such as vultures, buzzards, hawks, and falcons. There are about 300 species of butterflies, 60 species of reptiles, 31 species of amphibians, and 30 species of fish in the biosphere reserve.

== See also ==
- Nilgiris - A Shared Wilderness (2024 film)
- Nilgiri Wildlife and Environment Association
