= Valley View, Ooty =

Scenic tourism location in India

Valley View is a tourist spot in Ooty, India. It is located on the Ooty Coonoor road (NH 67) at a distance of 4 kilometres (2.5 mi) from Ooty bus stand and constitutes ward number 5 of the Nilgiris Lok Sabha constituency. It has views over the Ketti valley, and is an important tourist centre in Ooty. Ketti valley is sometimes referred to as the Switzerland of Southern India. The valley extends from the Deccan Plateau to the Coimbatore plains and is one of the largest valleys in the world.

== See also ==
- Ooty Lake
- Stone House, Ooty
- Mariamman temple, Ooty
- Ooty Golf Course
- St. Stephen's Church, Ooty
