= Avalanche Lake, Nilgiris =

Lake in India

Avalanche Lake
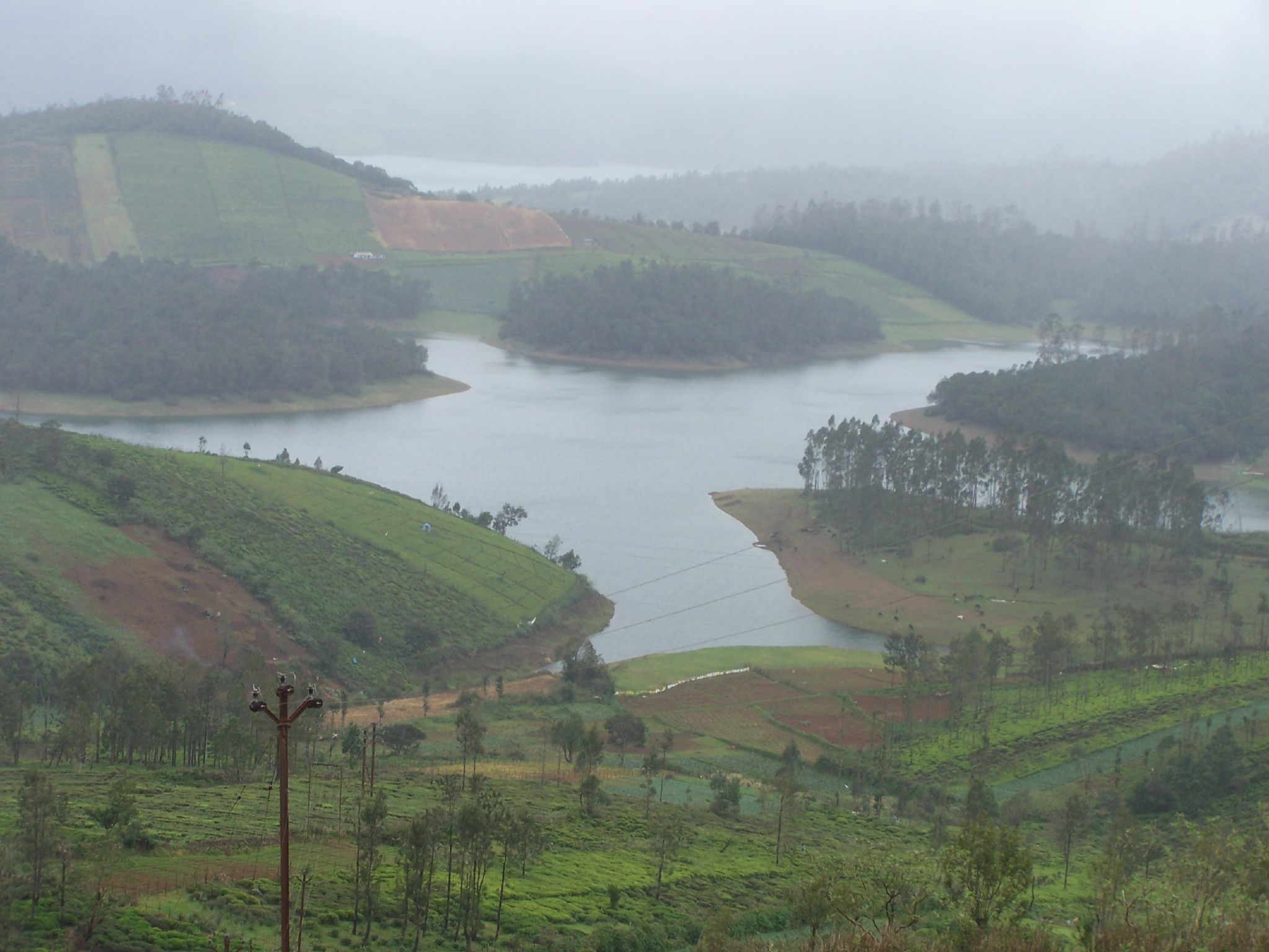
- The Avalanche Lake

- Location within Tamil Nadu
- Location: The Nilgiris, Tamil Nadu
- Coordinates: 11.322°N 76.611°E
- Frozen: No
- Islands: No

Avalanche Lake (Avalanchi lake) is located 28 kilometers from Ooty in the Nilgiris district in Tamil Nadu.

== Etymology ==
The lake derived the name avalanche because of a huge landslide (avalanche) that occurred in the region in the early 1800s. Avalanche received 92.1 cm rain in 24 hours on 9 August 2019 which is highest 24 hr Rainfall in South India. The day before it received 82 cm in 24 hr on 8 August 2019.

== Tourism ==
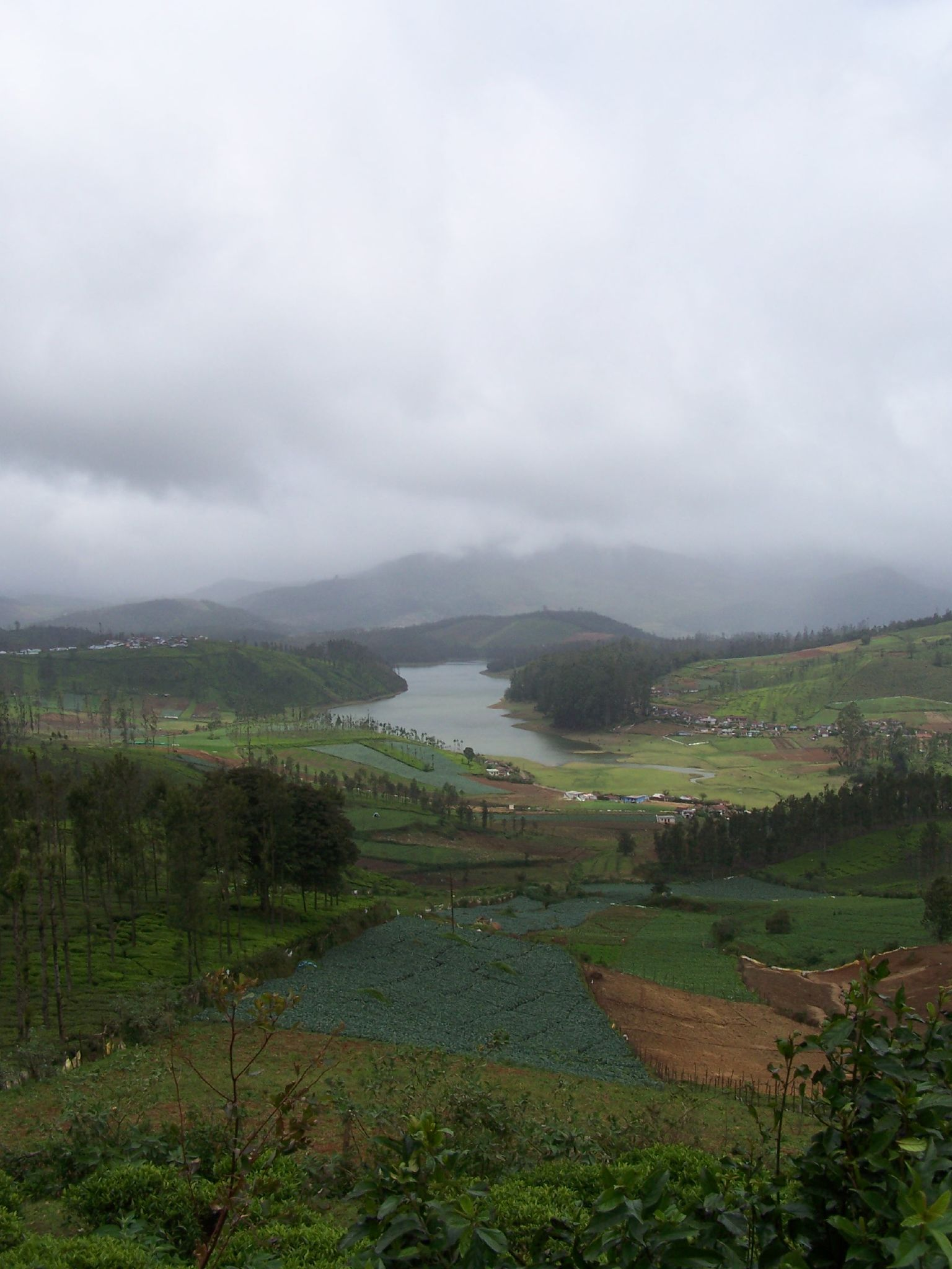
Mountain-top view of the Avalanche Lake

Avalanche Lake is an important tourism destination in the Nilgiris district. The lake is surrounded by a rolling landscape with blooming flowers like magnolias, orchids and rhododendrons. Tourists can traverse beside the lake through winding paths around the lake. Tourists visiting the lake can also engage themselves in Trout fishing. A trout hatchery is established near the lake, from where visitors can get fishing rods and other fishing accessories required for trout fishing. The lake is also used by tourists as a camp site wherein they pitch tents near the lake. Other tourist activities in the area include rafting across the lake and trekking the nearby hilly regions like Upper Bhavani where there are thick forests and untouched wild habitats.

== See also ==
- Ooty Lake
- Kamaraj Sagar Dam
- Adam's fountain
- Valley View, Ooty
