= Doddabetta =

Mountain in Tamil Nadu, India

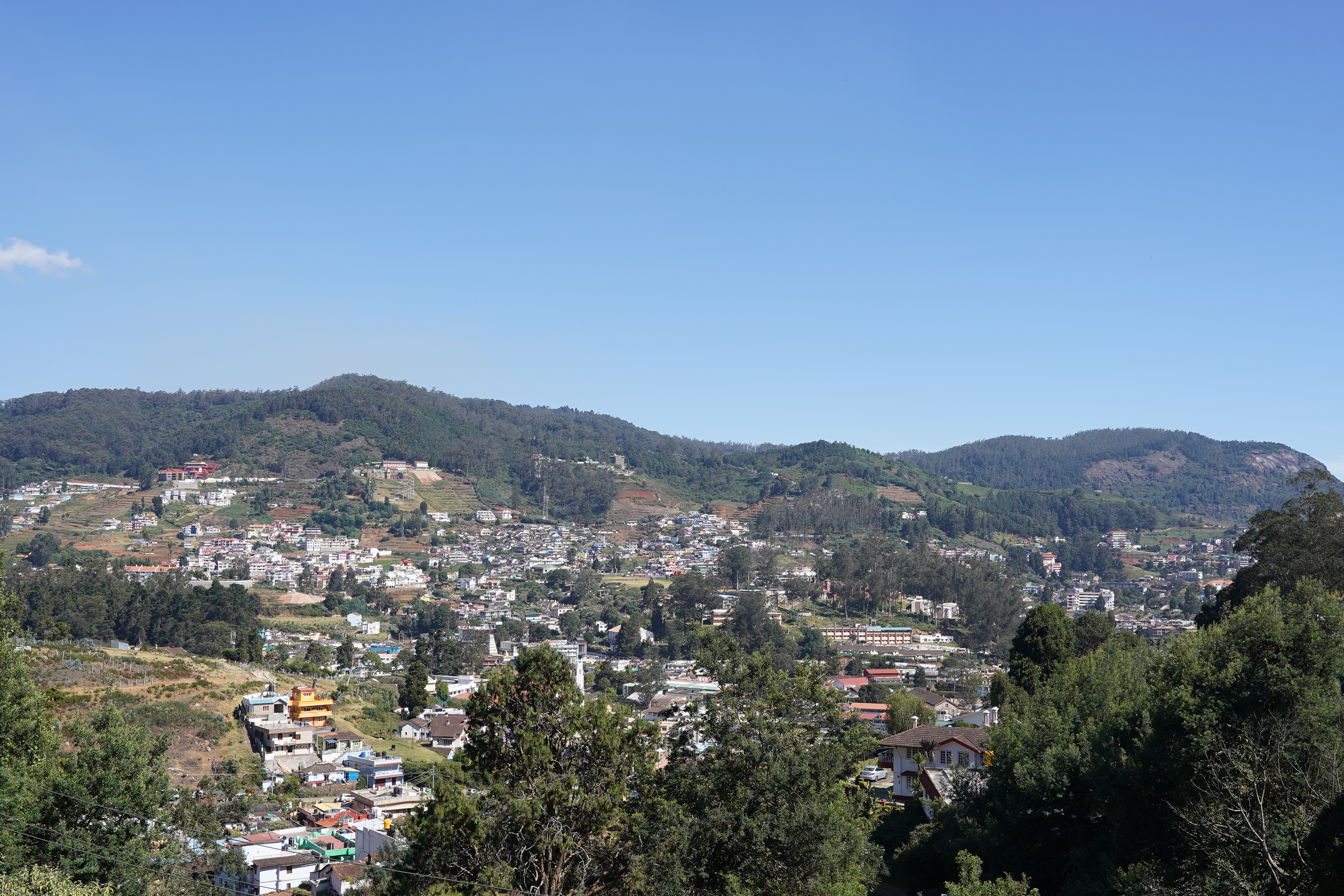
- Doddabetta (on the left) as seen from the WNW.

Highest point
- Elevation: 2,637 m (8,652 ft)
- Prominence: 2,256 m (7,402 ft)
- Listing: Ultra, Ribu; List of Indian states and territories by highest point
- Coordinates: 11°24′08.7″N 76°44′12.2″E

Geography
- Location within Tamil Nadu
- Location: Udagamandalam, Nilgiri District, Tamil Nadu, India
- Parent range: Nilgiri Hills

Climbing
- Easiest route: Doddabetta Road

Doddabetta (IPA: [d̪oɖːɐbeʈːɐ]) is the highest mountain in the Nilgiri Mountains at 2,637 metres (8,652 ft). There is a reserved forest area around the peak. It is 9 km (5.6 mi) from Ooty, on the Ooty-Kotagiri Road in the Nilgiris District of Tamil Nadu, India. It is a popular tourist attraction with road access to the summit. It is the third highest peak in South India next to Anamudi and Meesapulimala. The peaks Hecuba (2,375 m (7,792 ft)), Kattadadu (2,418 m (7,933 ft)) and Kulkudi (2,439 m (8,002 ft)) are the three closely linked summits in the west of the Doddabetta range near to Udagamandalam. The word Doddabetta is derived from either Kannada or Badaga, meaning 'big hill' in both the languages.

== Flora ==
The area surrounding Doddabetta is mostly forested. Sholas cover the hollows of its slopes. Slightly stunted, rhododendron trees, in the midst of thick coarse grass, flowering sub-alpine shrubs and herbs are common, even very near the peak.

== Telescope House ==
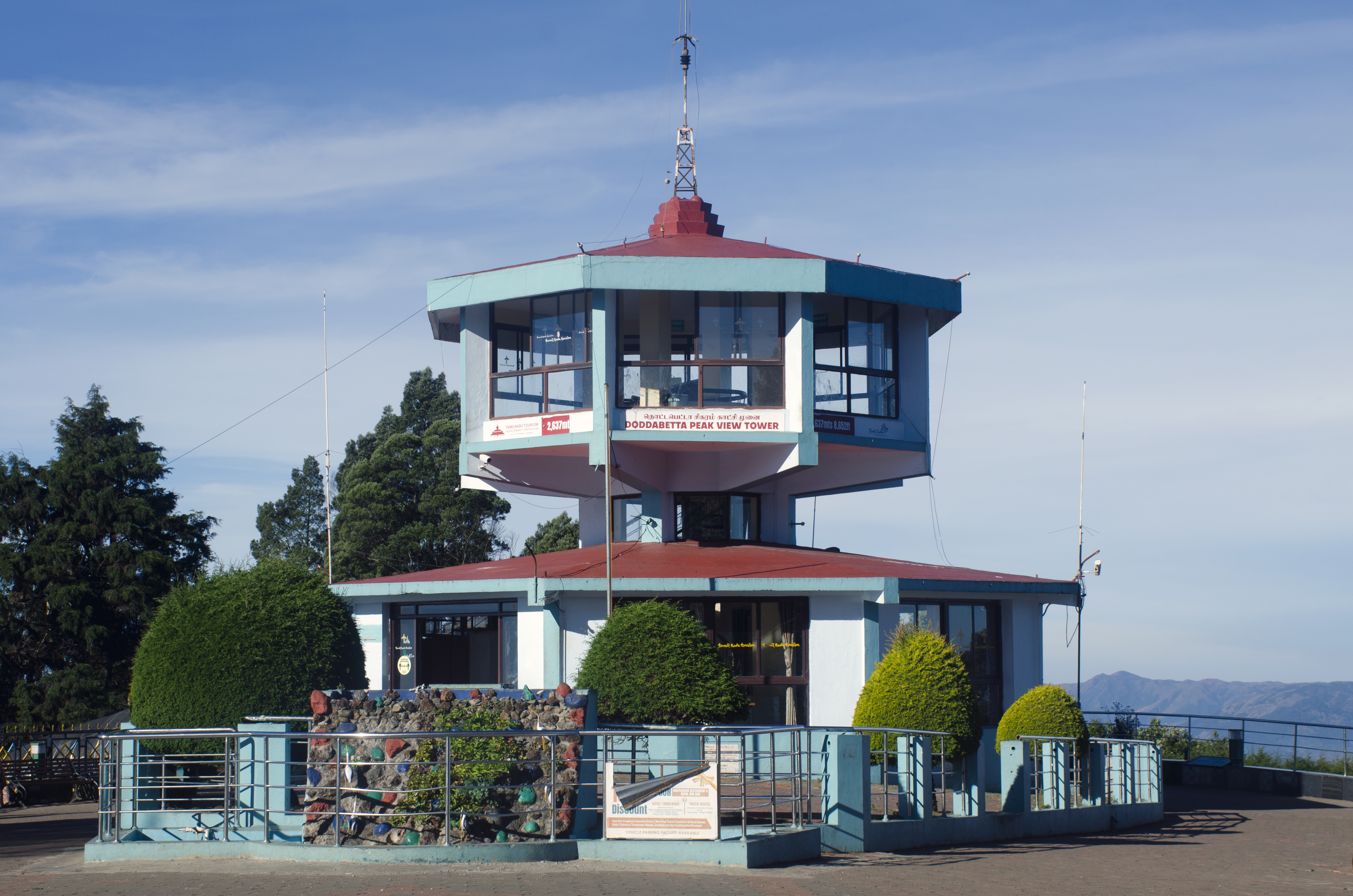
Telescope House at the summit of Doddabetta.

There is an observatory at the top of Doddabetta with two telescopes available for the public. It was opened on 18 June 1983 and is run by the Tamil Nadu Tourism Development Corporation (TTDC). The average number of viewers in 2001–2002 was 3500 per day in the season and 700 per day in the off-season.

== Gallery ==
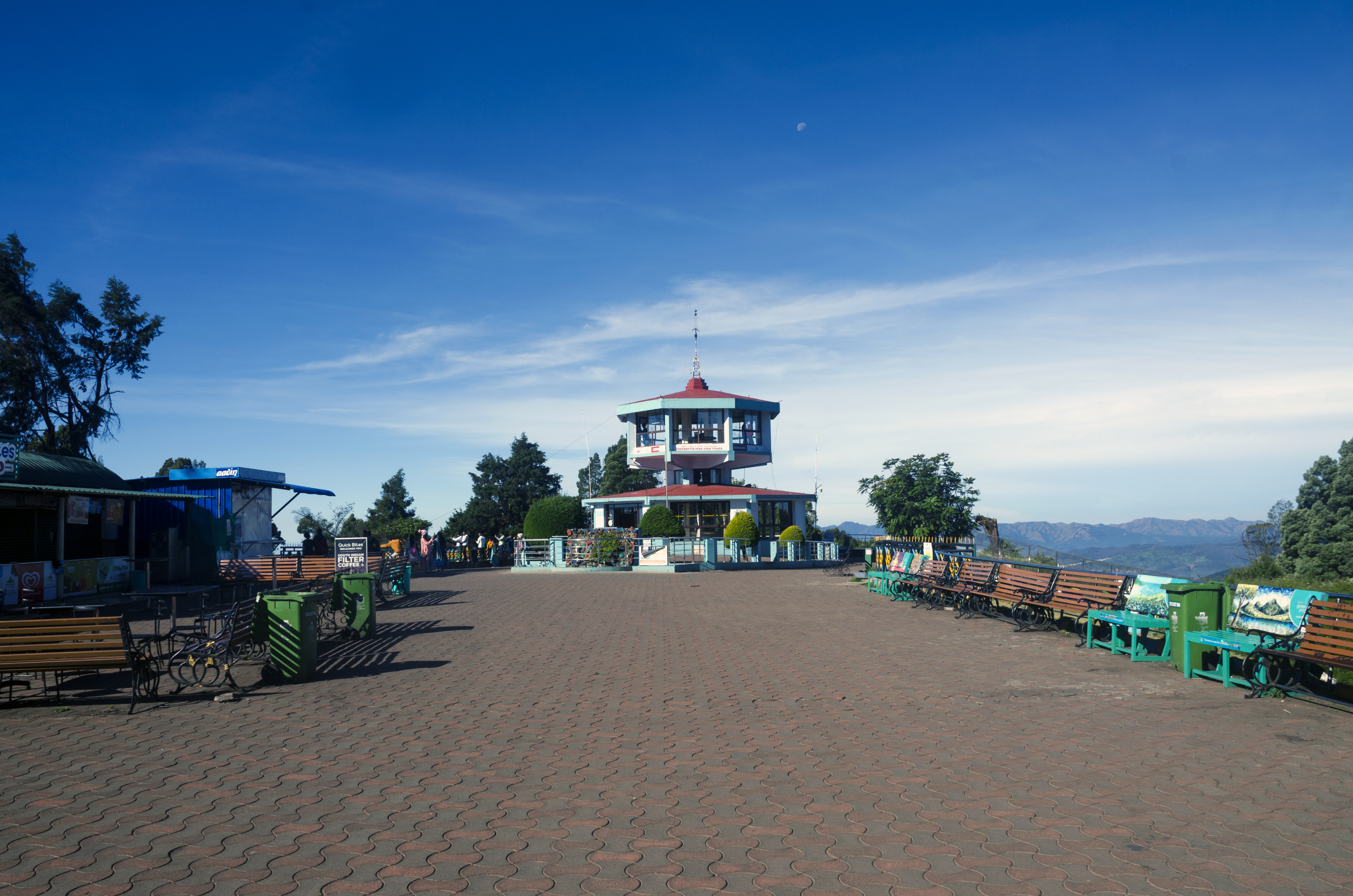
Park with Telescope House.

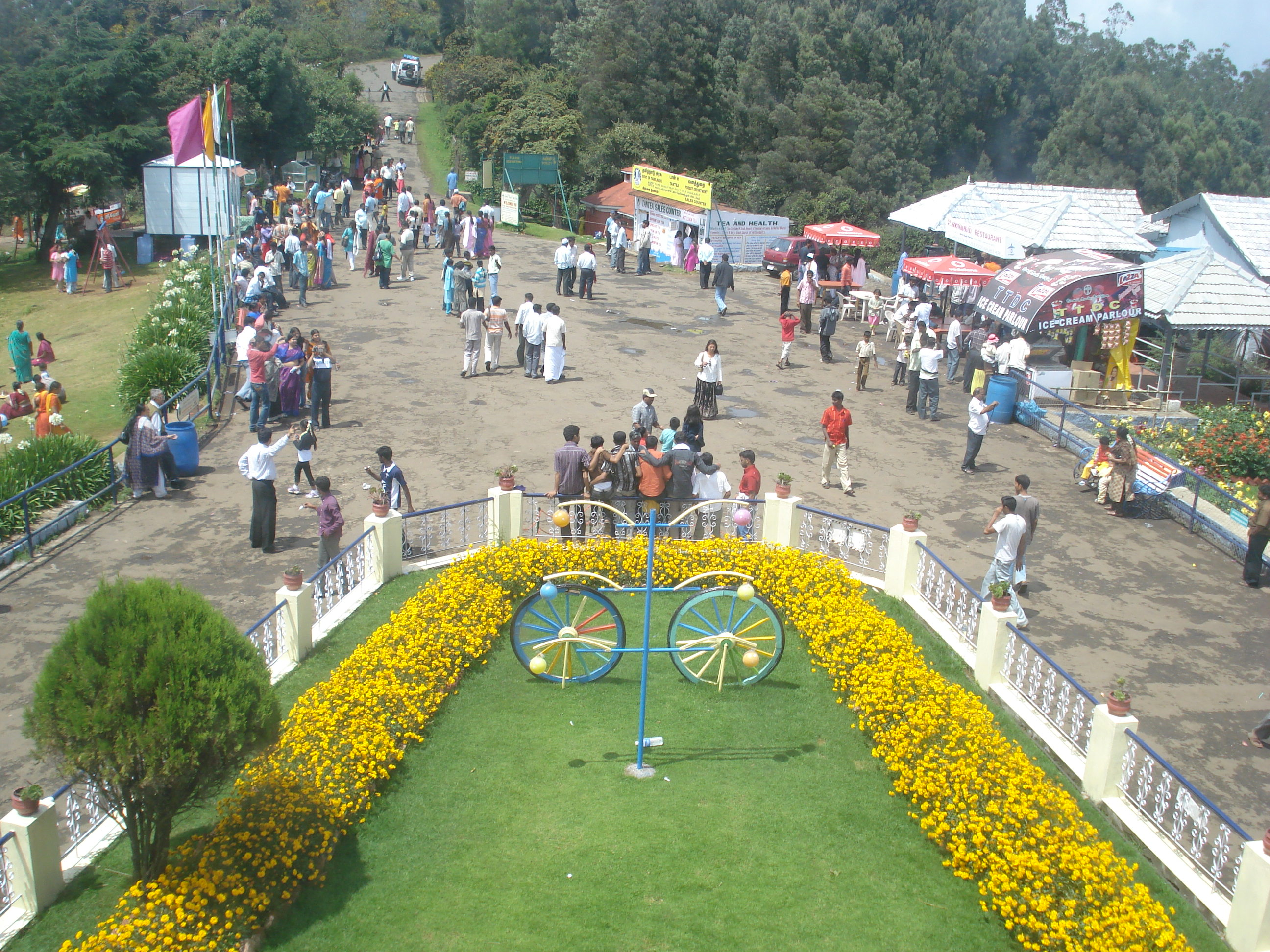
View from Telescope House.

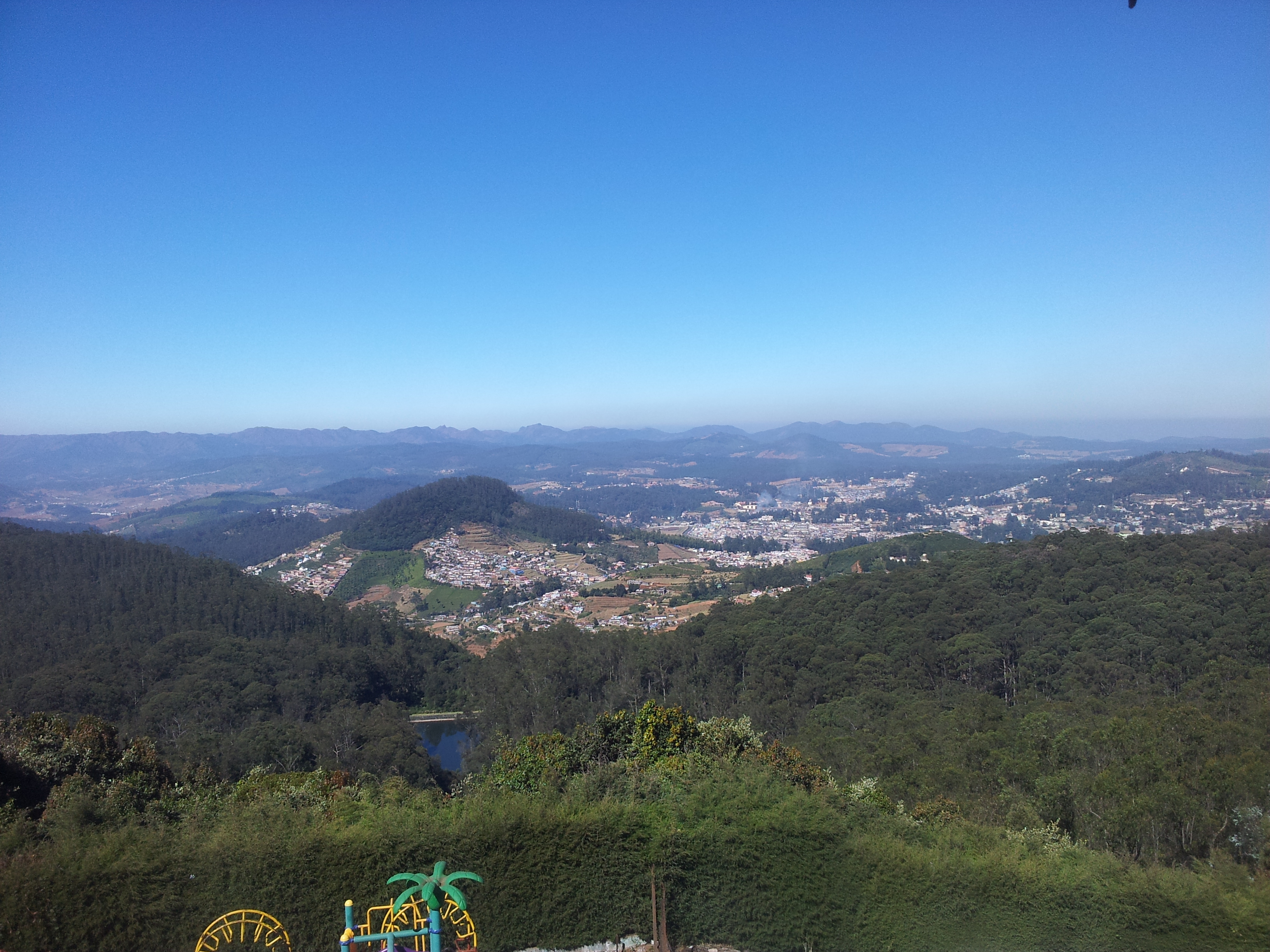
Downtown Ooty from Doddabetta. Looking West.

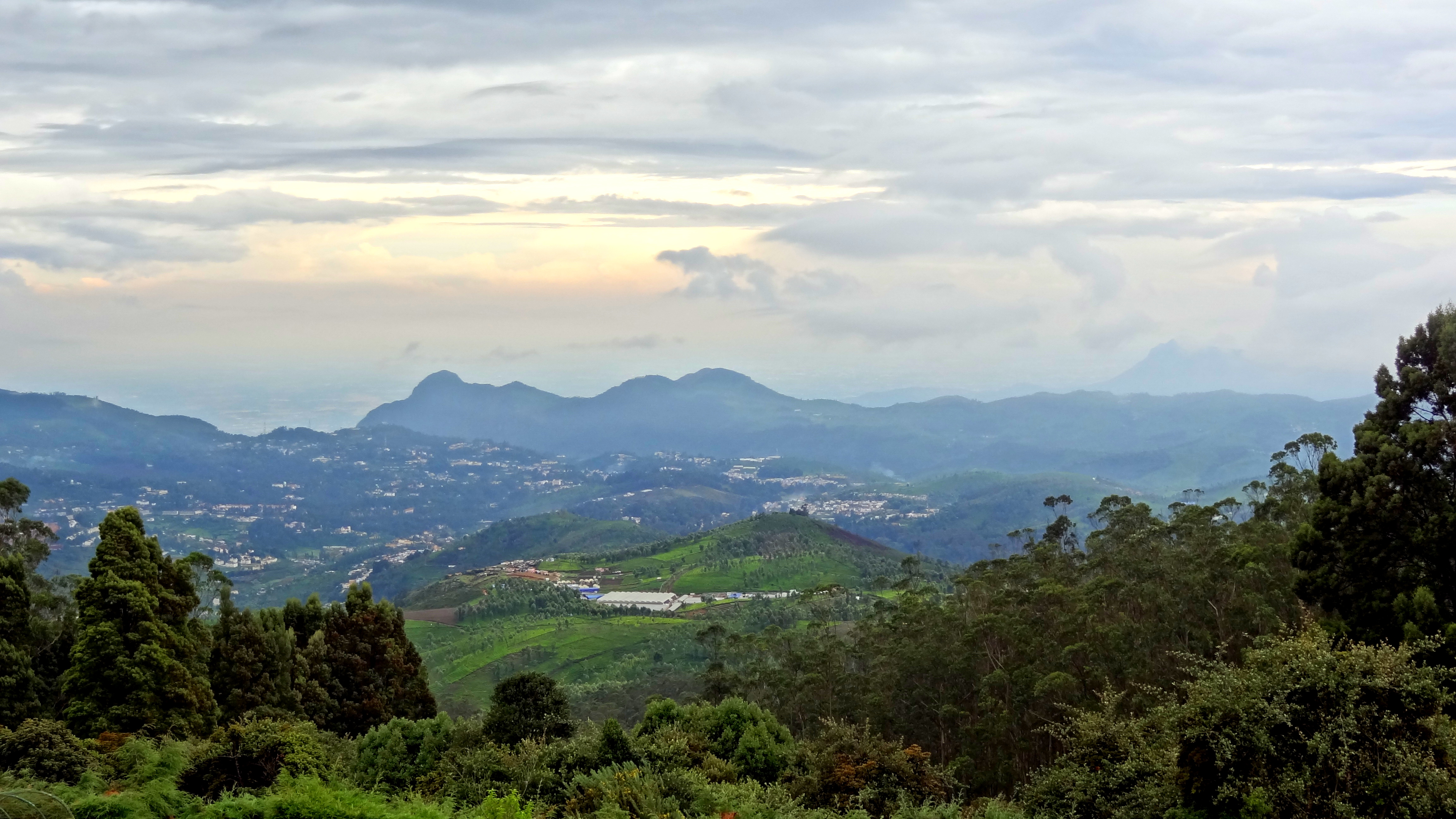
Southeast view from Telescope House.

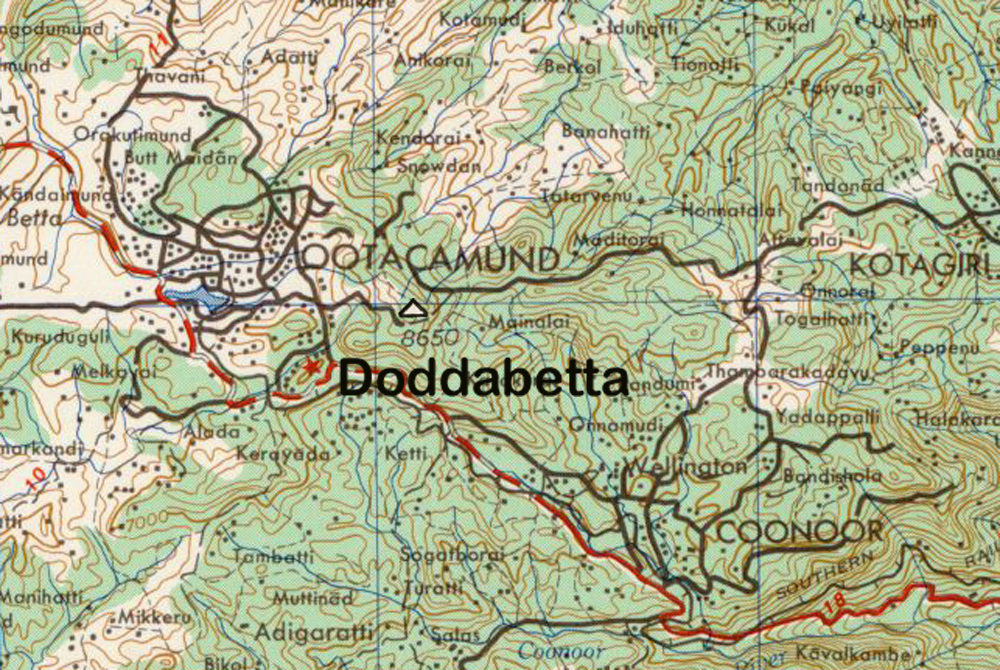
Detailed map of surrounding area.

== See also ==
- List of ultras of Tibet, East Asia and neighbouring areas
