= Holy Trinity Church, Ooty =

Church in Tamil Nadu, India

Coordinates: 11.413444°N 76.702056°E

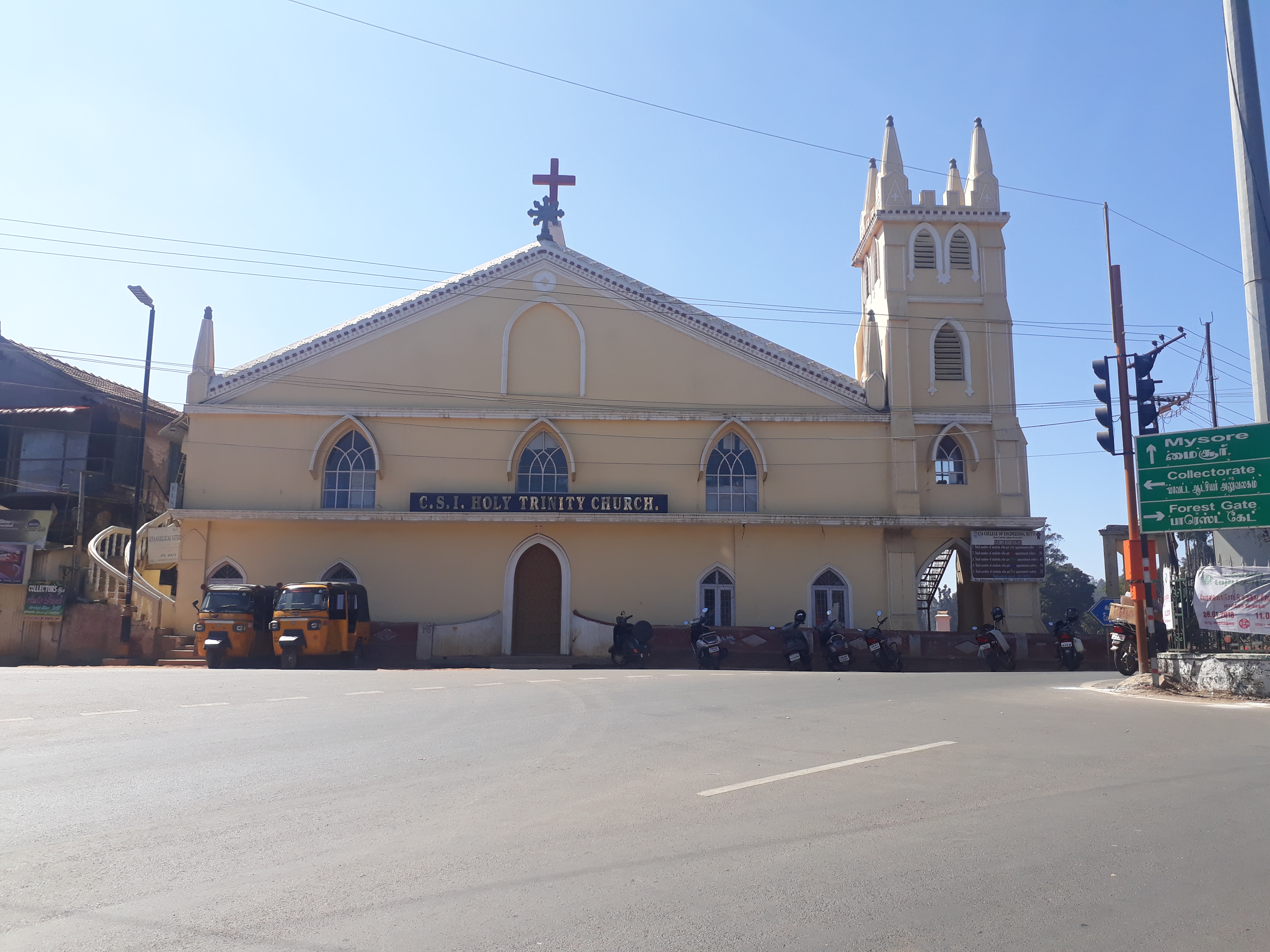
Front of Holy Trinity Church

Holy Trinity Church is located in Ooty (Ootacamund), in the state of Tamil Nadu. It is one of the oldest landmarks in Ooty. The building was initially used by Indian Christians as a place of worship on Sundays and used as a school during weekdays. It became a dedicated church from 1858.

== History ==
Initially, the building was used as a school on weekdays and served as a church on Sundays. In 1858 it was dedicated as a church. George Uglow Pope, Tamil scholar and translator of major Tamil literary works, including the Thirukkural, into English, took part in the initiation of the Holy Trinity Church and also served as its chaplain in 1858–59. The Church celebrated 150 years of existence in November 2008.

A congregation of around 700 families are associated with the church. Seven churches are attached to the Pastorate: St. Thomas Church, Ooty, St. John's Church, Kandal, Immanuel Church, Kenthorai, All Saints Church, Toda colony, St. Paul's Church, Muthorai, Christ Church, Thomund, Good Shepherd Church H. P. F. Rev. Victor Prem kumar was the Presbyter. Rev.Jerry Raj kumar is the Asst. Presbyter. St. Thomas Church celebrated 150 years of its existence recently.

== See also ==
- St. Stephen's Church, Ooty
