= Pykara =

River in India

Coordinates: 11.4547°N 76.5972°E

Pykara Falls
- பைக்காரா ஆறு
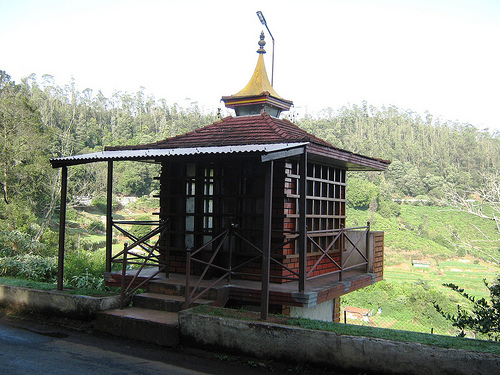
- Pykara Temple
- Interactive map of Pykara Falls
- Total height: 61 metres (200 ft)

The Pykara is a river 19 kilometres (12 mi) from Ooty in the Indian State of Tamil Nadu with a village by the same name nearby. The Pykara River is considered very sacred by the Todas. It rises at Mukurthi peak, flows northwards, and then turns to the west after reaching the edge of the plateau. The river flows through Mukurthi, Pykara and Glenmorgan dams, and forms part of an important hydro-electric power project. It is a tributary of the Moyar River, which in turn is a tributary of the Bhavani River, which itself is a tributary of the Kaveri River.

The river flows over a series of waterfalls, the last two of 55 metres (180 ft) and 61 metres (200 ft) being known as Pykara Falls. The falls are approximately 6 kilometres (4 mi) from the bridge on the main road. There is a forest rest house at Pykara. A boat house on the Pykara reservoir is an added attraction for tourists. Pykara has well-protected, fenced sholas, Toda settlements, large grassy meadows and good wildlife habitat. The Pykara Dam, falls and reservoir attract many tourists.

== Climate ==
Pykara's climate is classified as subtropical highland climate (Cwb) under the Köppen climate classification. Pykara, due to its location in the Nilgiris, gets rain from both the monsoons. The wet season runs from April to December and the dry season from January to March.

Climate data for Pykara
Month	Jan	Feb	Mar	Apr	May	Jun	Jul	Aug	Sep	Oct	Nov	Dec	Year
Mean daily maximum °C (°F)	19.7 (67.5)	19.9 (67.8)	22.4 (72.3)	22.5 (72.5)	22.7 (72.9)	19.2 (66.6)	17.4 (63.3)	18.5 (65.3)	19.4 (66.9)	19.4 (66.9)	19.1 (66.4)	19.0 (66.2)	19.9 (67.9)
Mean daily minimum °C (°F)	6.7 (44.1)	7.7 (45.9)	9.8 (49.6)	11.6 (52.9)	12.4 (54.3)	12.5 (54.5)	12.3 (54.1)	12.3 (54.1)	12.0 (53.6)	11.5 (52.7)	9.7 (49.5)	7.5 (45.5)	10.5 (50.9)
Average precipitation mm (inches)	19.5 (0.77)	18.3 (0.72)	32.2 (1.27)	104.4 (4.11)	165.5 (6.52)	250.2 (9.85)	475.1 (18.70)	313.3 (12.33)	175.6 (6.91)	244.7 (9.63)	148.2 (5.83)	76.3 (3.00)	2,023.3 (79.64)
Average rainy days	3	2	4	8	11	12	17	18	11	13	12	8	119
Source: Climate-Data.org

== Dam and power station ==
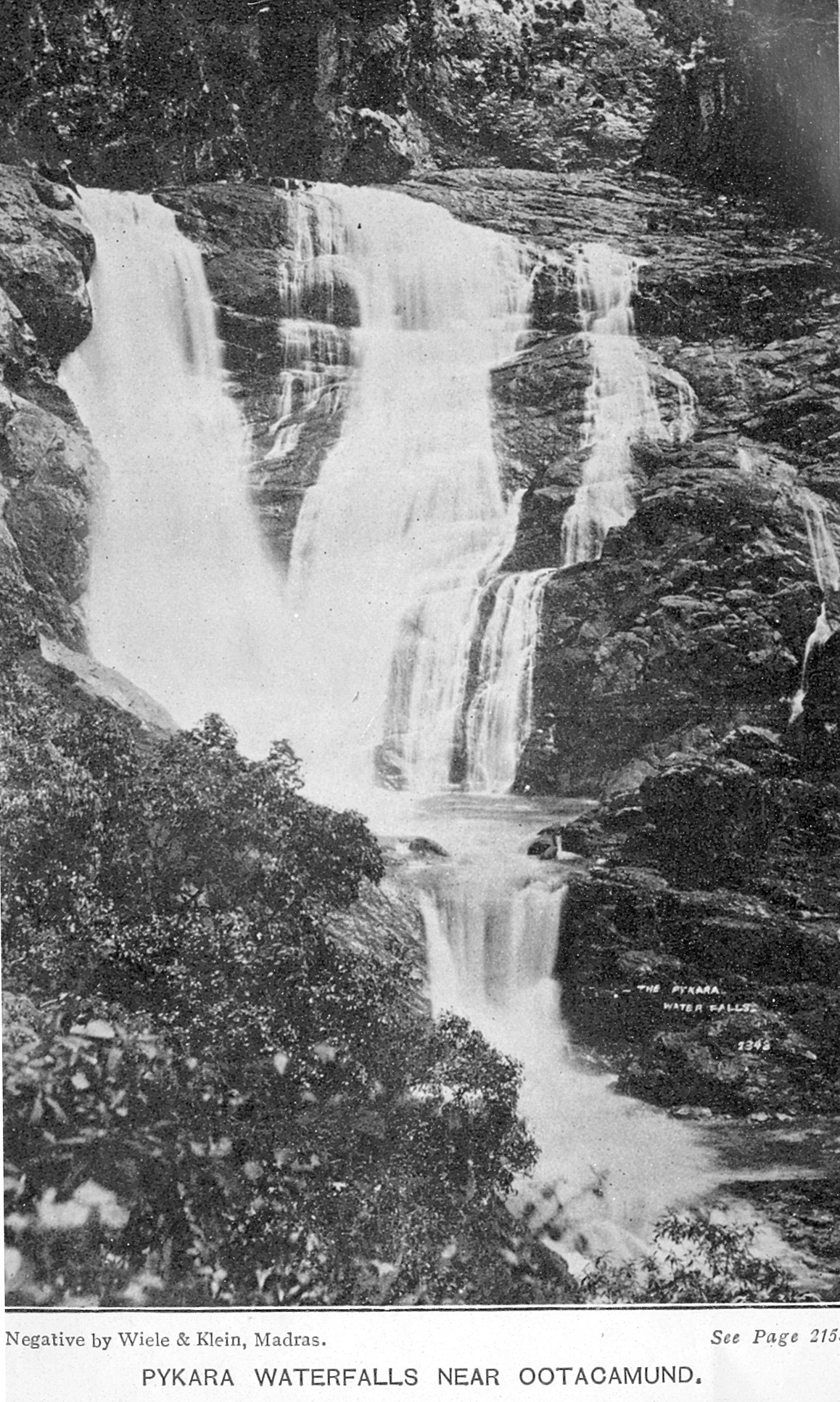
Pykara Falls in 1913

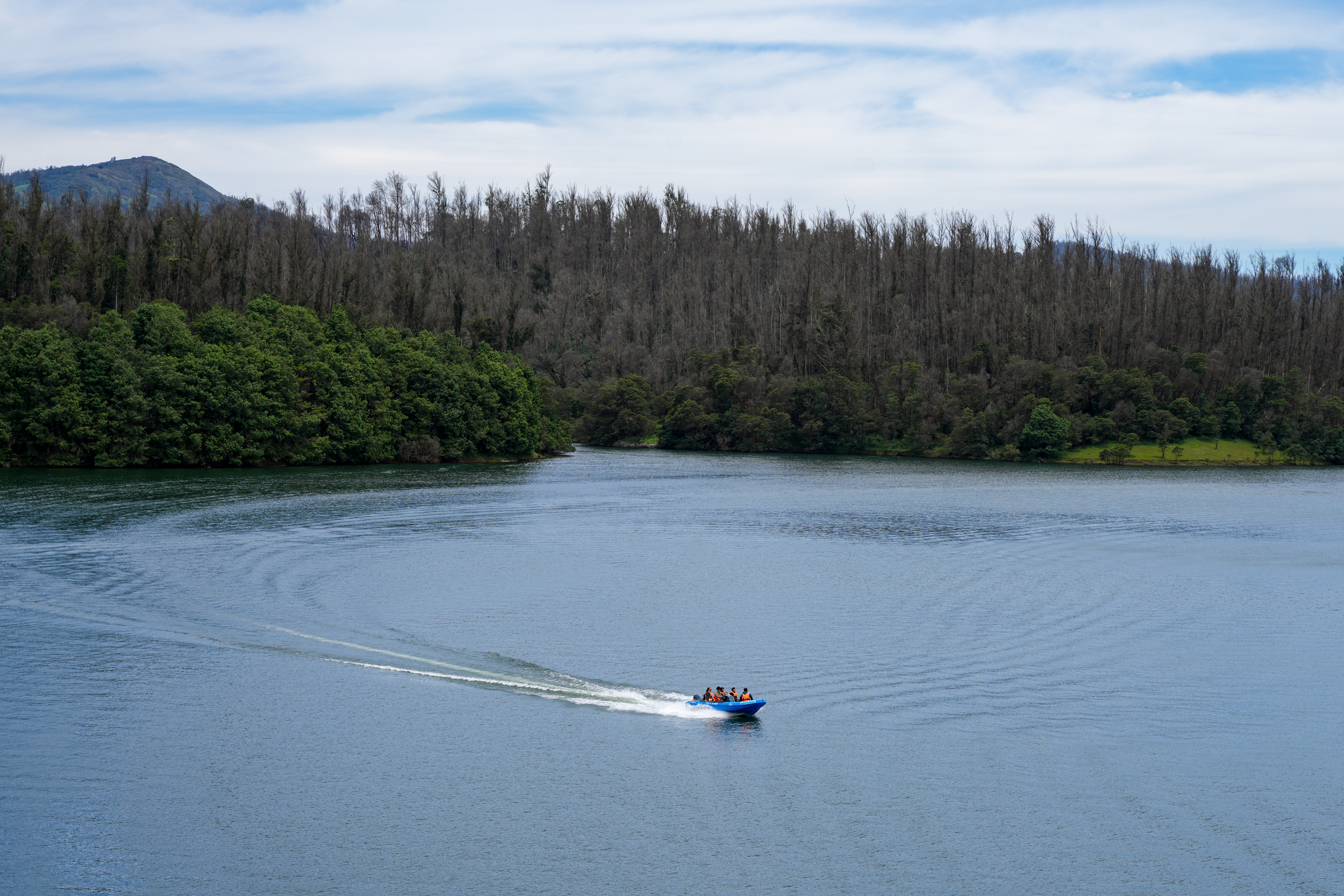
Tourists in a speed boat on Pykara Lake, view from the Boat House

The dam is near the main Ooty–Gudalur road and includes a power station. One of the oldest power plants in South India, the Pykara station still functions, generating about 60 megawatts. The first unit of 6.65 MW was commissioned in October 1932. Sir C.P. Ramaswamy Aiyar, Diwan of Travancore, worked with the British regime in 1920s and 1930s in the setting up of the Pykara project. A team of engineers led by H.G. Howard, a chief engineer in the then electricity department, was responsible for carrying out the project. The Bangalore-Chennai industrial region is highly dependent on the Pykara hydroelectric plant.

The Pykara Station, declared as a heritage plant in September 1997, triggered the establishment of more hydro-electric power stations in the state. Today, the Nilgiris district alone boasts hydro-electric stations with an aggregate installed capacity of 837 MW. Five decades after establishment of the old plant, the Electricity Board (EB) authorities came up with a plan for the Pykara Ultimate Stage Hydro Electric Plant (PUSHEP), containing three units of 50 MW each. The construction of an underground powerhouse, 17 tunnels and the hydraulic head of 1,039 metres (3,409 ft) are the special features of the new plant. According to the EB, the hydraulic head is the highest in Asia. The access to the powerhouse is a tunnel 1.5 kilometres (0.9 mi) long.

== Boat house ==
A boat house on the Pykara Reservoir is an added attraction for tourists. The boat house with restaurant is maintained by the Tamil Nadu Tourism Development Corporation. It has several motor boats which are allowed for 20 minutes and speed boats which are allowed for 10 minutes (as of 2011).

== Image gallery ==
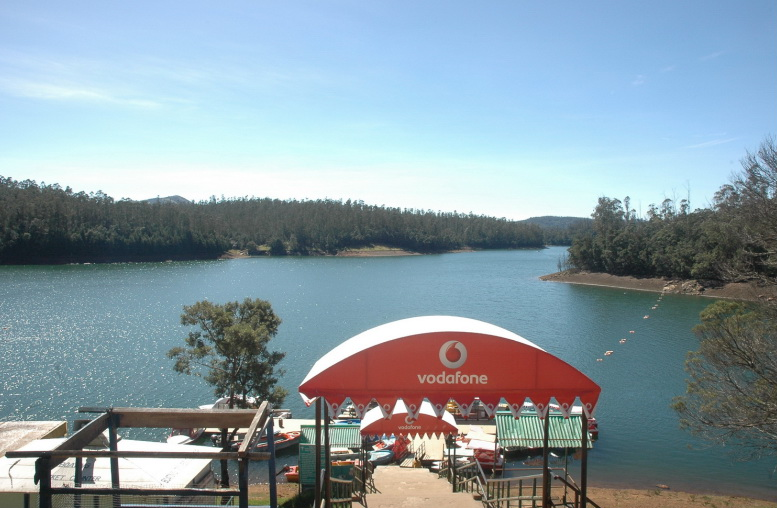
Pykara Boathouse

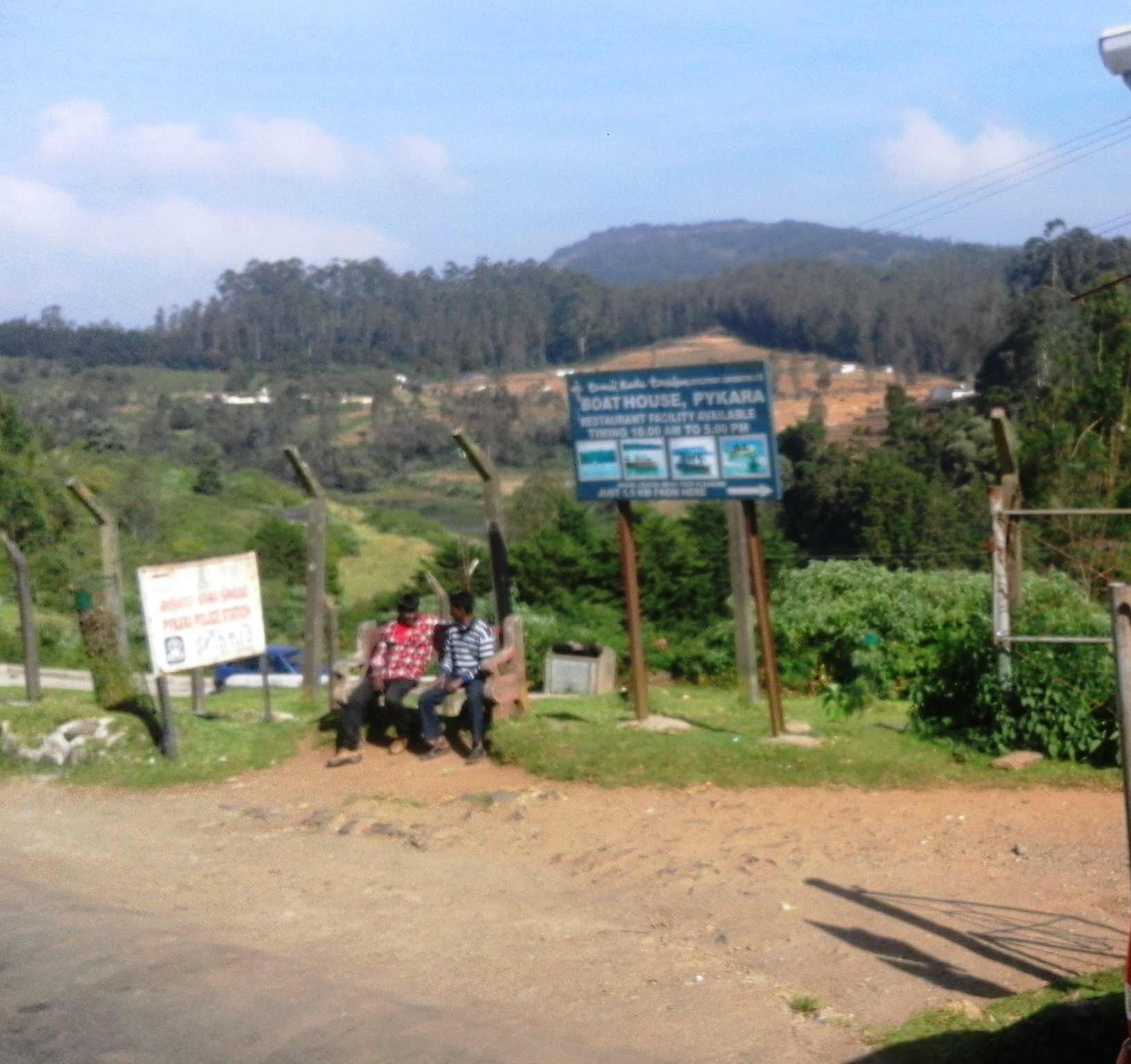
Pykara, Town

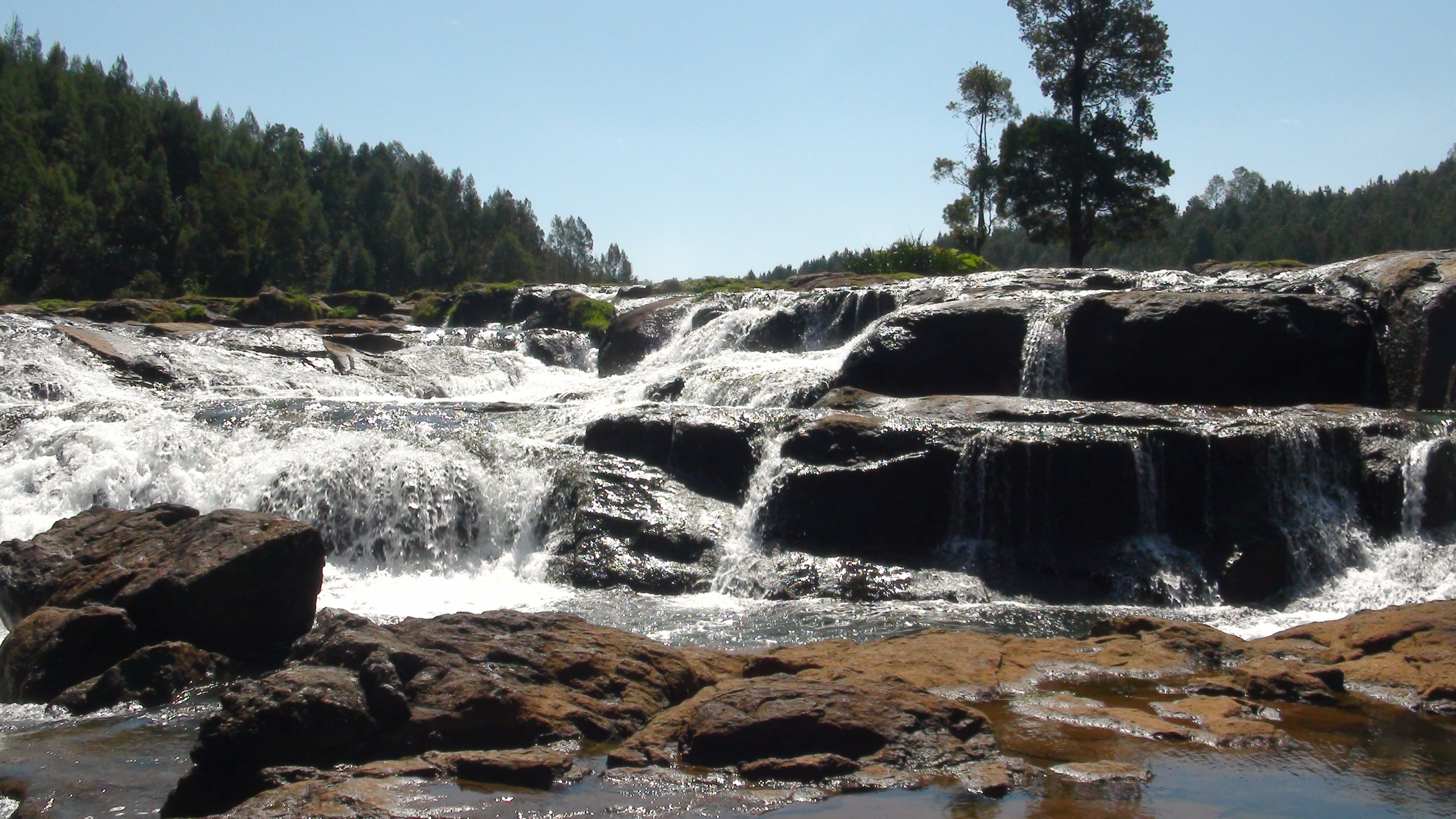
Pykara waterfalls

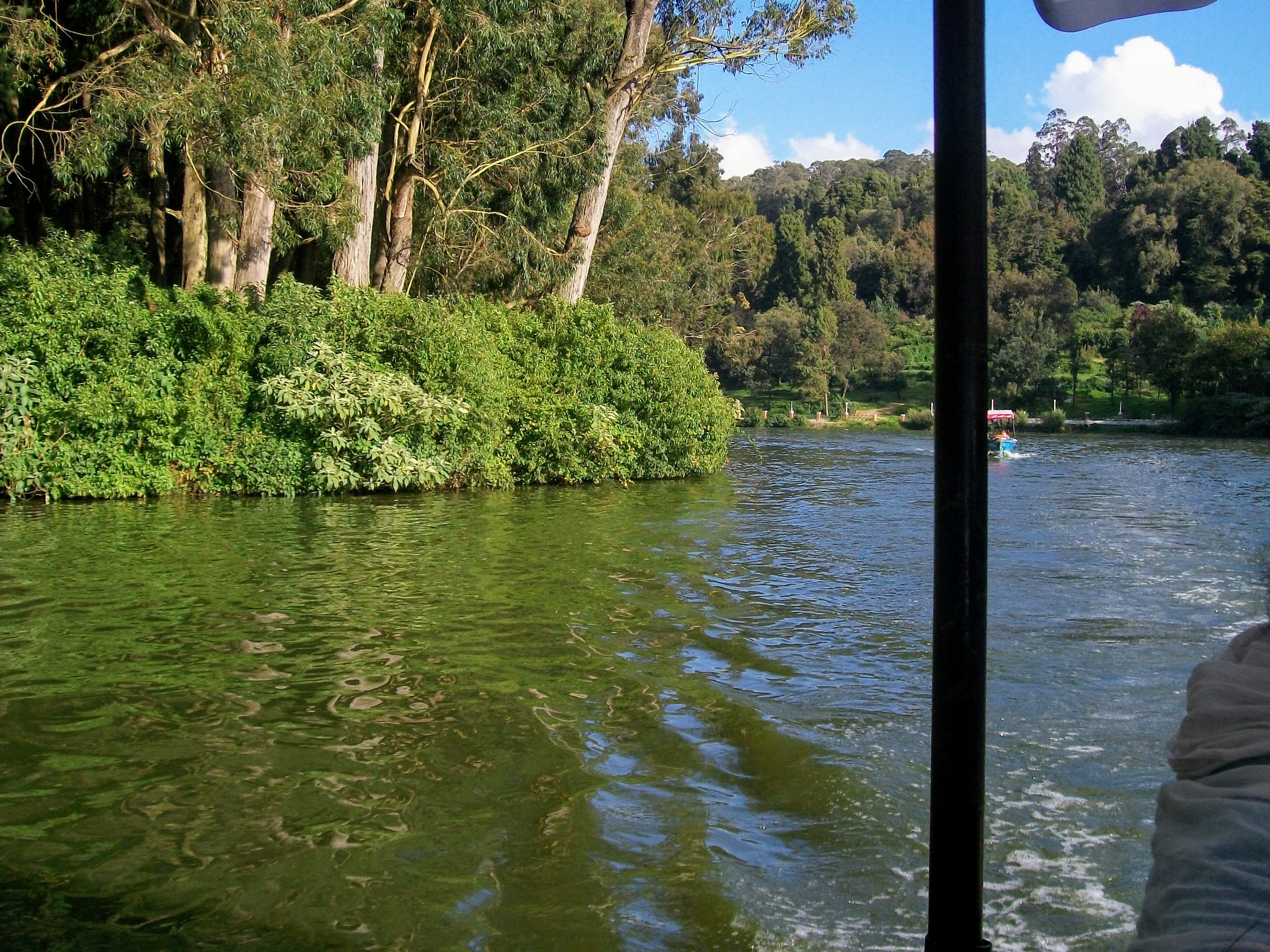
View of Pykara lake from a boat
