= Kamaraj Sagar Dam =

Dam in Tamil Nadu, India

Coordinates: 11°26′39″N 76°39′7″E

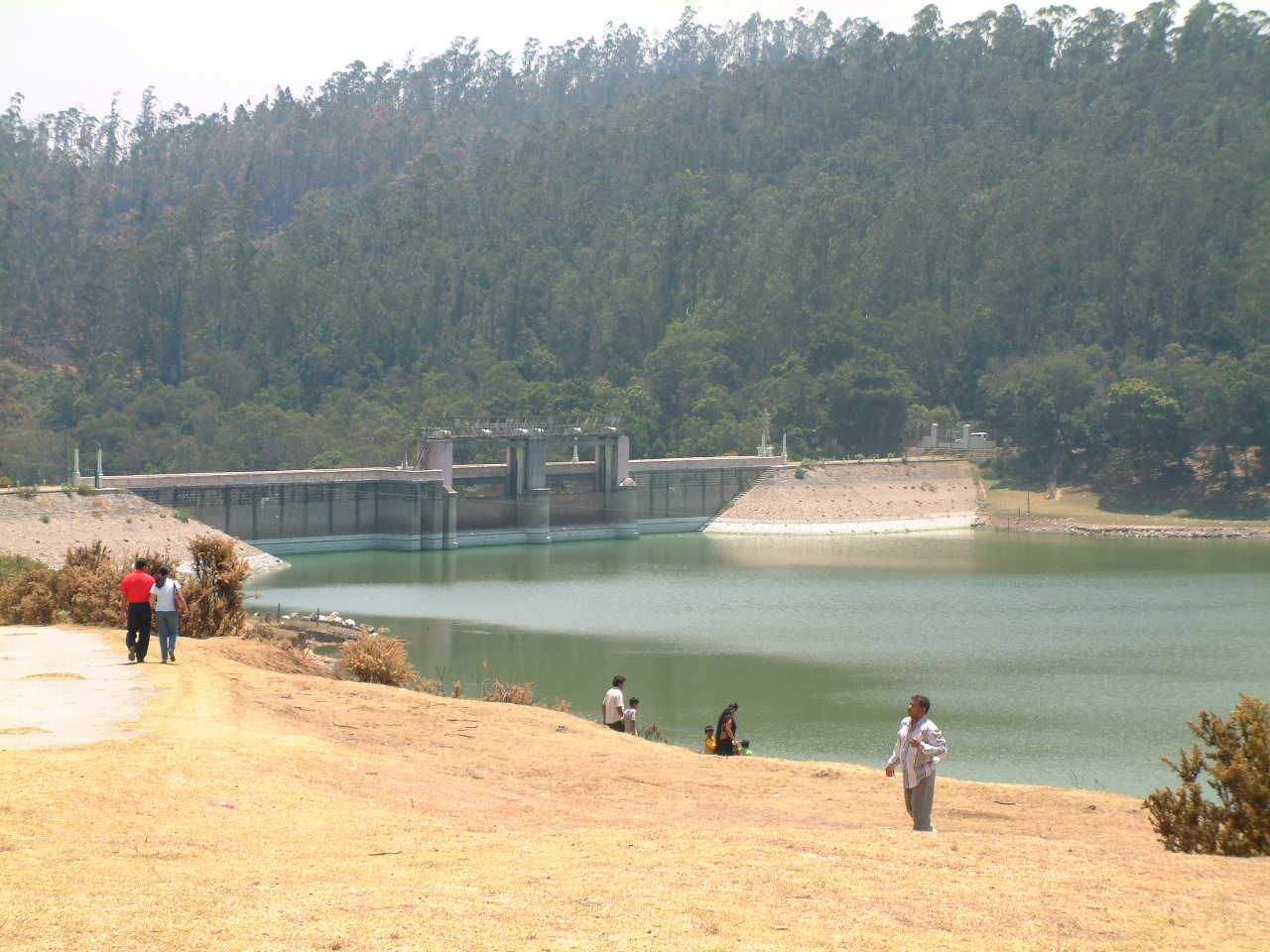
Kamaraj Sagar Dam

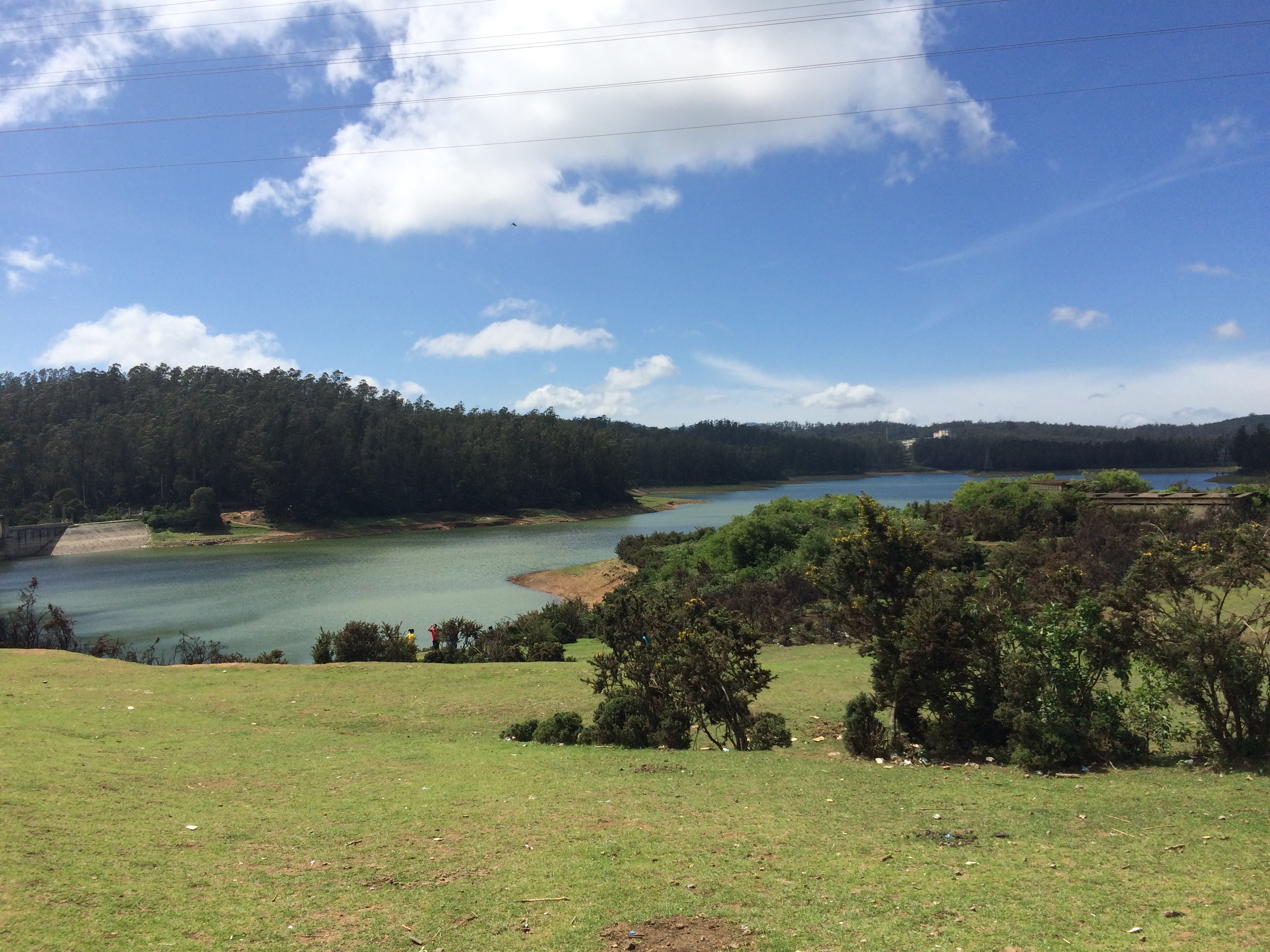
Reservoir

The Kamaraj Sagar Dam (also known as Sandynalla reservoir) is in the Nilgiris district of Tamil Nadu state in India. It is located at a distance of 10 km from the Ooty bus stand. It is a picnic spot and a film shooting spot on the slopes of the Wenlock Downs. The dam's storage capacity is 26.6 million cubic meters(MCM) or 0.94 tmc ft.

== Activities ==
The various tourist activities the dam include fishing and studying nature and environment.

== See also ==
- Ooty Lake
- Stone House, Ooty
- Mariamman temple, Ooty
- Ooty Golf Course
- St. Stephen's Church, Ooty
