= Ooty Golf Course =

Golf course in Ooty, India

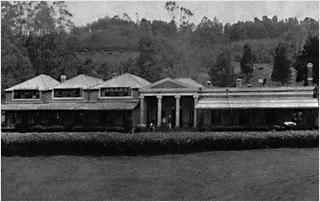

- Location within Tamil Nadu
- 11.417421°N 76.672238°E

Club information
- Location: Ooty, Tamil Nadu, India
- Established: 1896
- Type: Private
- Owner: Gymkhana Club, Ooty
- Operator: Gymkhana Club, Ooty
- Total holes: 18
- Tournaments: Amateur golf championship, South India Open, Gymkhana golf tournament South Zone junior and sub-junior championship
- Website: www.ootygymkhana.club
- Designed by: Ross Thompson
- Par: 72
- Length: 6,235 yards

Ooty Golf Course is located in the town of Ooty in the state of Tamil Nadu, India. The golf course is set at an altitude of 2194 metres. It is owned by the Gymkhana Club in Ooty. The course extends over 78.33 hectares and comprises 18 holes.

== History ==
Colonel Fane Sewell, the then Secretary of the Blue Mountains Tennis and Cricket Club, formed the golf course in March 1891, which initially comprised nine holes. Golf enthusiasts formed a golf club nearby, called the Gymkhana club in September 1896. In 1929, hydraulic systems were installed to pump water from a nearby stream using a hydraulic ram for storage in a water tank. Feeder pipes were installed in 1970 to water the golf course.

== Features ==
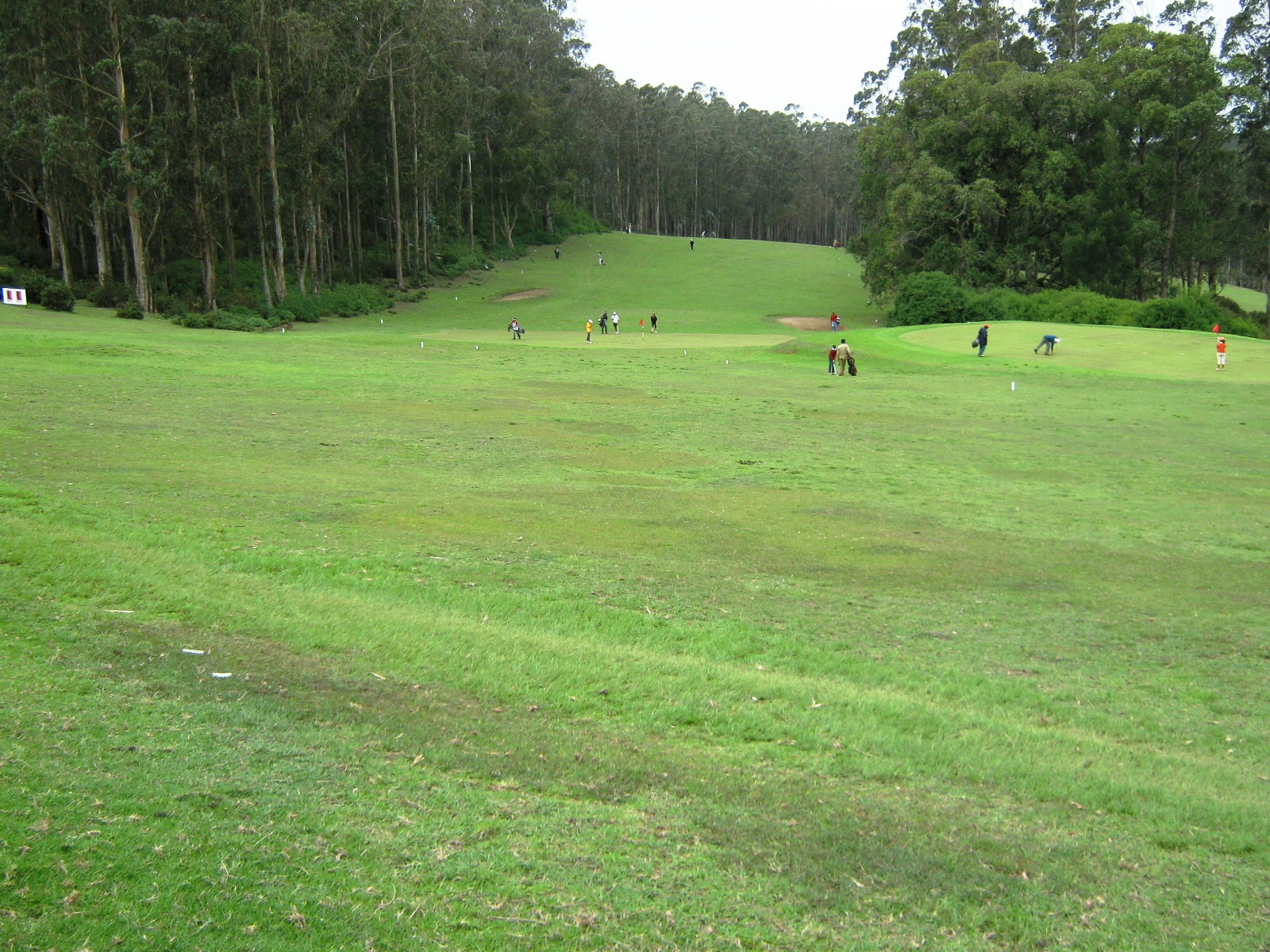
Ooty golf course

As the air is thinner in Ooty due to the high altitude, the balls travel comparatively farther. The course is surrounded by thick forests. The golf course contains many varieties of trees like rhododendron, oak, aromatic eucalyptus, and fir which add to the scenic atmosphere. Nine holes out of the eighteen holes are shot blind as the course has a rolling landscape. This is also the reason for the green being not visible from the tee-off area, though there are guide posts which help the players to the right direction. The fifth hole rises about 61 metres above the fourth hole and hence is considered the toughest hole of the course. The Ooty Golf Club offers fairways that are lush but also tight. The greens are well manicured and large.

== Fox hunt ==
a golfer at the course also has the possibility of running into an ongoing fox hunt at the 13th hole. Beagles and Foxhounds are still trained today to take part in the hunt. The fox hunt in the area dates back to 1847 and can be witnessed in the course even today. The greens are fenced in order to prevent other wild animals from straying onto the course.

== Tournaments ==
An annual amateur golf championship is held during summer, which dates back to 1906. The first winner of the championship was Major Quinton. Another golfer, R.B. Carrick, won the championship nine times between 1914 and 1929. In recent years several other major tournaments have been organized on the golf course.

== Facilities ==
Accommodation for golfers is provided by the golf club with an annex with ten rooms and six huts. Other facilities include indoor games like billiards, cards and table tennis, swimming pool, bar and a restaurant.

== See also ==
- Ooty Lake
- Stone House, Ooty
- Mariamman temple, Ooty
- St. Stephen's Church, Ooty
