= St. Stephen's Church, Udhagamandalam =

Church in Tamil Nadu, India

St. Stephen's Church, Udhagamandalam.
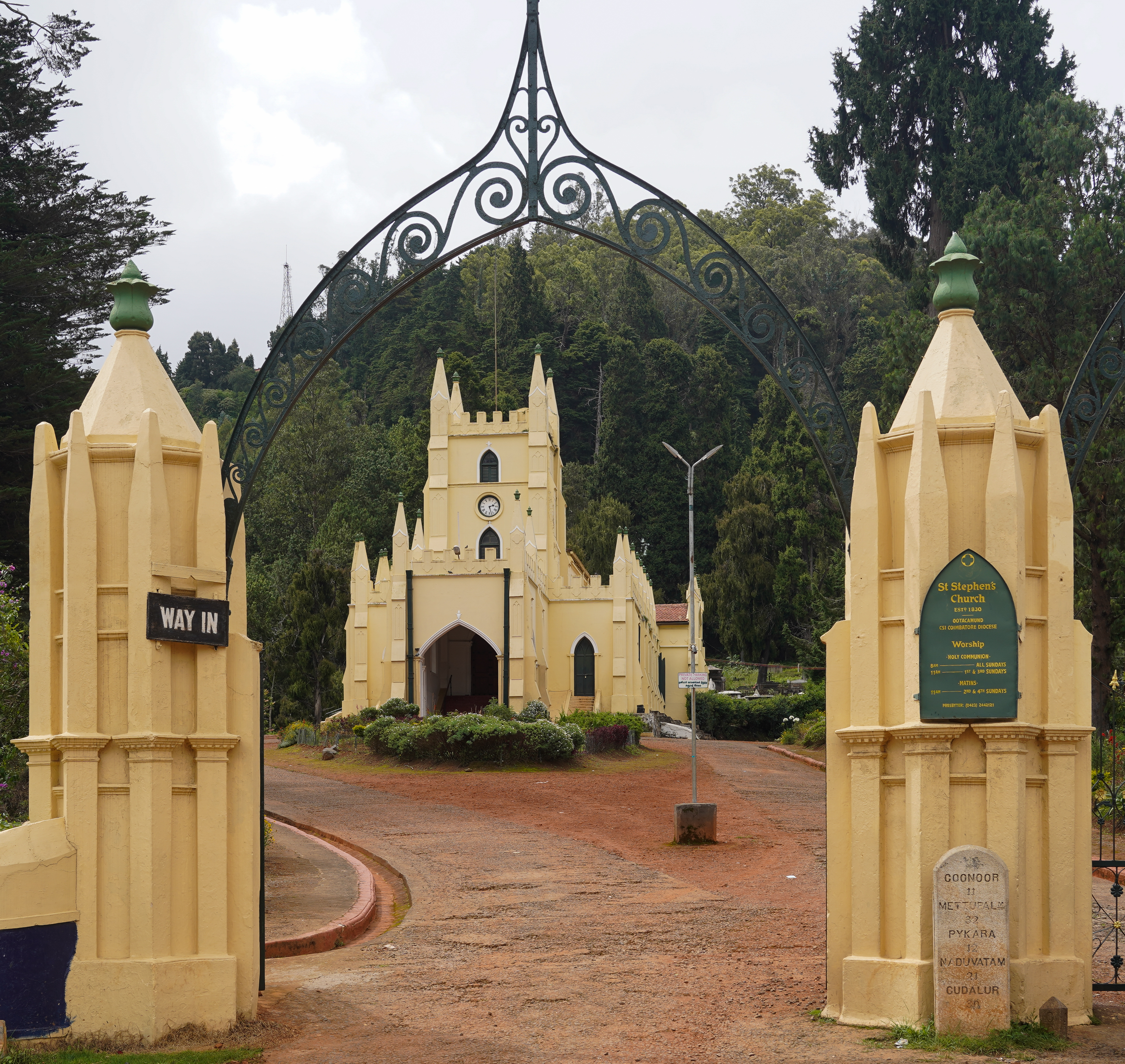
- St. Stephen's Church, Ooty
- St. Stephen's Church, Udhagamandalam.
- 11.414687°N 76.702056°E
- Location: Ooty, Tamil Nadu
- Country: India
- Denomination: Church of South India
- Website: www.ststephenschurchooty.co.in

History
- Founded: 25 January 1830
- Founder: John Matthias Turner
- Consecrated: 5 Dec 1830

Architecture
- Architect: John James Underwood

Administration
- Diocese: Coimbatore

St. Stephen's Church is located on the road to Mysore in Ooty, in the state of Tamil Nadu, India. It is one of the oldest churches in the Nilgiris district.

== History ==
The church dates back to the 19th century. Stephen Rumbold Lushington, the then Governor of Madras, who keenly felt the need for a church in Ooty exclusively for the British, laid the foundation for the church on 23 April 1829, to coincide with the birthday of King George IV. St. Stephen's Church was consecrated by John Matthias Turner, Bishop of Calcutta, on 5 November 1830. It was opened to the public communion on Easter Sunday 3 April 1831. It came under the Church of South India in 1947. The architect in charge was John James Underwood, Captain, Madras Regiment.

== Architecture ==
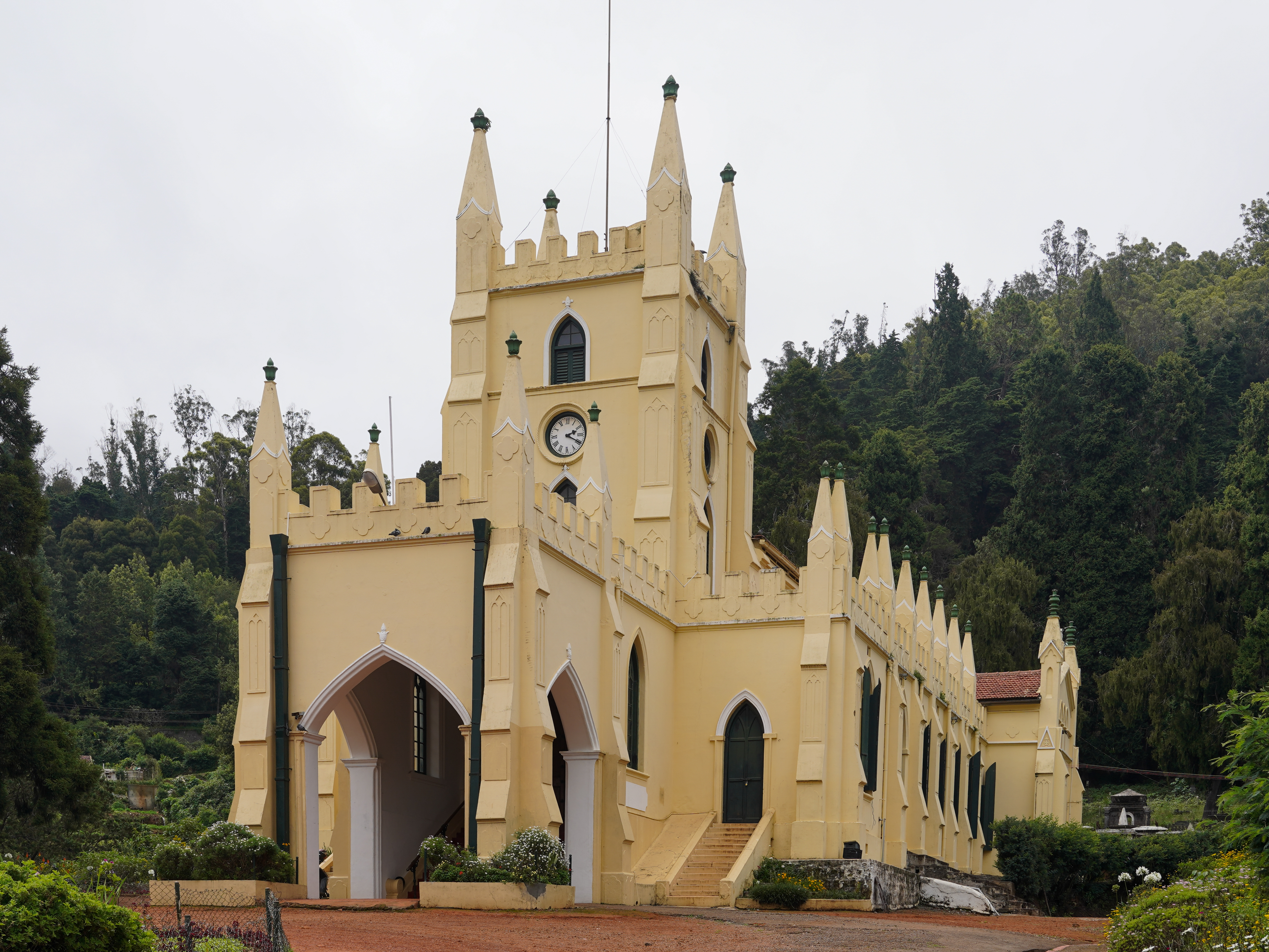
St. Stephen's Church (ca. Jun 2022)

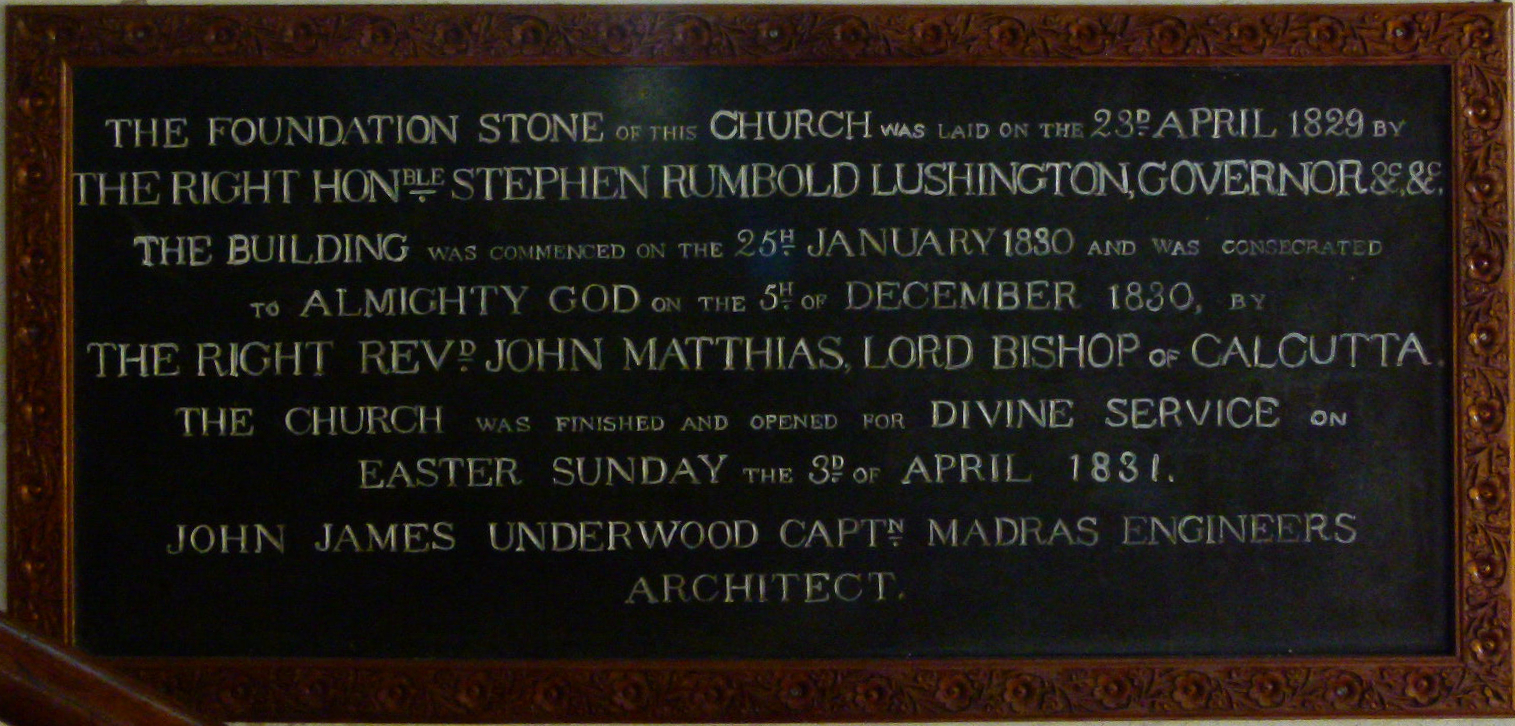
Foundation stone

The massive main beam and other timber used in the church were taken from Tipu Sultan's palace on the island of Srirangapatna. The material was transported up the Sigur ghat. The architect was Captain J.J. Underwood and the construction cost about Rs 24,000 at the time. The foundation stone was laid in April 1829. A painting depicting the Last Supper is displayed on the wall on the western side, which is situated above panelled doors. The church also features stained glass windows depicting, among other scenes, the crucifixion of Christ and Mary holding baby Jesus in her arms. Instead of the usual bell in the tower, 4 hammer-like structures are tied on inverted-V shaped wooden planks using wires, which when pulled from the floor, produce a musical sound. The church also has a pulpit with a flight of steps to the left of the chancel, a pew with a chancel in a raised position and a vestry.

== See also ==
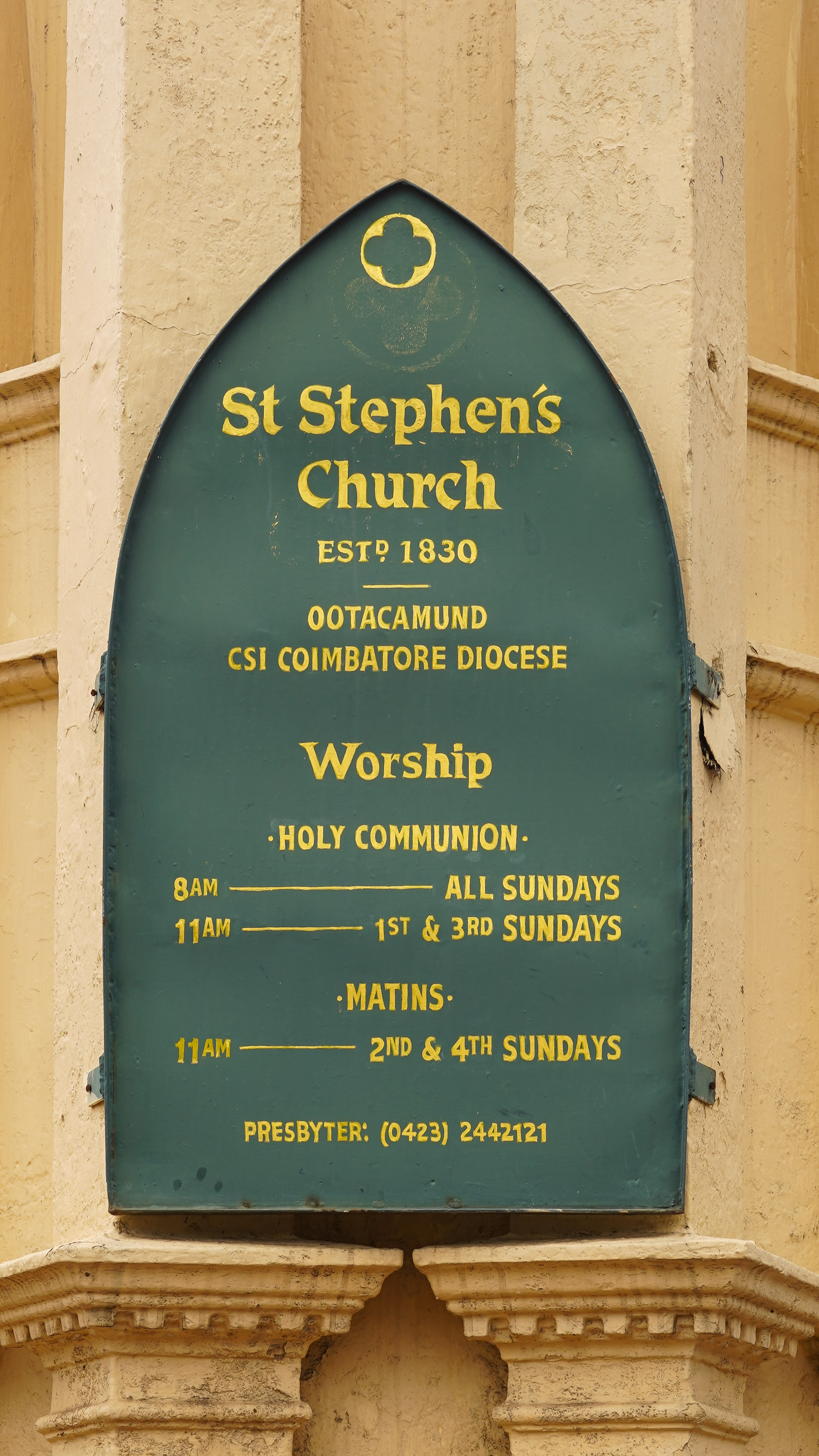
Info board on gate (ca. Jun 2022)

- Holy Trinity Church, Ooty
