= List of Indian documentary films =

This is a list of Indian documentary films arranged in alphabetical order.

Title	Year	Language	Director(s)	Notes
3D Stereo Caste	2012	Malayalam	A. S. Ajith Kumar	
7 Notes to Infinity	2012	English	Shrenik Rao	
A Celebration Of Hindu Spirituality, Diversity And Faith Kumbh Mela	2022	English	Gopinath Krishnamoorthy	
A Child of the Streets	1967	English	Shyam Benegal	
A Historical Sketch of Indian Women	1975	English	Mani Kaul	
A Quilt of Many Cultures: South India	1990	English	Shyam Benegal	
A Spectacle For The Gods Kulasekharapattinam	2022	English	Gopinath Krishnamoorthy	
A Treasure in the Snow (Sikkim)	2002	English	Goutam Ghose	
A Tribute to Odissi	1986	English	Goutam Ghose	
Abode of Kings: Rajasthan	1990	English	Shyam Benegal	
About Love	2019	Marathi, English	Archana Atul Phadke	
Amar Lenin (My Lenin)	1970	Bengali	Ritwik Ghatak	
An Encounter with Faces	1978	English	Vidhu Vinod Chopra	
An Insignificant Man	2017	English, Hindi	Khushboo Ranka	
Ancient River & Ancestors	2016	English	AjuKarthick G	
And the Show Goes On	1996	English	Mrinal Sen	
Animal Reproduction and Artificial Insemination in Bovines	1983	English	Shyam Benegal	
Arrival	1980	Hindi	Mani Kaul	
Baavra Mann	2013	English	Jaideep Varma	
Bal Sansar	1974	Hindi	Shyam Benegal	
Bala	1976	English	Satyajit Ray	
Before My Eyes	1989	English	Mani Kaul	
Beyond Genocide: Bhopal	1986	Hindi; English	Tapan Bose	
Beyond the Himalayas	1996	English	Goutam Ghose	
Bombay: Our City	1985	English, Hindi	Anand Patwardhan	
Books That Talk	1981	English	Sai Paranjpye	
Born into Brothels	2005	Bengali, English	Zana Briski	
Bunkar: The Last of the Varanasi Weavers	2018	English, Hindi	Satyaprakash Upadhyay	
Calcutta My El Dorado (City Life)	1990	English	Mrinal Sen	
Celluloid Man	2012	English, Hindi, Kannada, Bengali	Shivendra Singh Dungarpur	
Chains of Bondage	1974	English	Goutam Ghose	
Chariot Of The Gods - Jagannath Puri Rath Yatra	2025	English	Gopinath Krishnamoorthy	
Children of the Pyre	2008	Hindi	Rajesh S. Jala	
Chitrakathi	1977	Hindi	Mani Kaul	
Chooriyan	1993	Hindi	Sai Paranjpye	
Classic Dance Forms of India: Koodiattam	1986	Hindi	Prakash Jha	
Climate's First Orphans	2005	English	Nila Madhab Panda	
Close to Nature	1967	English	Shyam Benegal	
Dabcherry Milk Project	1976	English	Sai Paranjpye	
Dance Of The Gods Theyyam	2023	English	Gopinath Krishnamoorthy	
Dance of The Tigers Pulikali	2023	English	Gopinath Krishnamoorthy	
Daughters of Mother India	2014	Hindi, English	Vibha Bakshi	
Development in Irrigation	1981	English	Goutam Ghose	
Dhrupad	1983	Hindi	Mani Kaul	
Didi	1994	Hindi	Prakash Jha	
Ek Ghat Ki Kahani	1987	Hindi	Goutam Ghose	
Epilepsy	1976	English	Shyam Benegal	
Faces After the Storm	1981	English	Prakash Jha	
Father, Son, and Holy War	1995	Hindi, English	Anand Patwardhan	
Festival of Elephants - Thrissur Pooram	2025	English	Gopinath Krishnamoorthy	
Festival of India	1985	French, English	Shyam Benegal	
Festival Of The Untameable Spirit - Jallikattu	2022	English	Gopinath Krishnamoorthy	
Final Solution	2003	English, Hindi	Rakesh Sharma	
Foundations of Progress	1972	English	Shyam Benegal	
Friends Together	1978	Hindi	Prakash Jha	
Growth for a Golden Future	1982	English	Shyam Benegal	
Gulabi Gang	2012 in Dubai; 2014 in India	Hindi, Bundeli	Nishtha Jain	
Horoscope for a Child	1969	English	Shyam Benegal	
Hungry Autumn	1974	English	Goutam Ghose	
I Am 20	1967	English	S. N. S. Sastry	
I Can Love Too	2011	English, Kannada	Mrinmoy Bhowmick	
I Want to Be an American	2013	English, Spanish	Qaushiq Mukherjee	
India's Daughter	2015	English, Hindi	Leslee Udwin	
India's Forbidden Love	2018	English, Tamil	Sadhana Subramaniam	
India's Struggle for National Shipping	1947	Hindi	Paul Zils	
Indian Youth: An Exploration	1968	English	Shyam Benegal	
Inshallah, Football	2010	Kashmiri, Urdu, English	Ashvin Kumar	
Inshallah, Kashmir	2012	Kashmiri, Urdu, Hindi, English	Ashvin Kumar	
Interdependence Film 2019	2019	English, French, Italian	Nila Madhab Panda	
Jai Bhim Comrade	2011	English, Hindi, Marathi	Anand Patwardhan	
Jawaharlal Nehru	1982	Hindi	Shyam Benegal	
Jeevan Smriti (On Rabindranath Tagore)	2013	Bengali, English	Rituparno Ghosh	
Jyanto Durga (Durga Live)	2010	Bengali	Arin Paul	
Kakkoos	2017	Tamil	Divya Bharathi	
Kalahandi	2001	Odia	Goutam Ghose	
L'archivio a oriente	2012	Italian, Persian, Chinese	Goutam Ghose	
Ladies First	2018	Hindi	Uraaz Bahl	
Laloorinu Parayanullathu	2012	Malayalam	Sathish Kalathil	
Land of Sand Dunes	1986	English	Goutam Ghose	
Learning Modules for Rural Children	1974	English	Shyam Benegal	
Loknayak	2004	Hindi	Prakash Jha	
Love in India	2009	Tamil, Bengali, English, Hindi	Qaushiq Mukherjee	
Machines	2016	Hindi	Rahul Jain	
Martial Arts Of India Gatka	2024	English	Gopinath Krishnamoorthy	
Martial Arts Of India Kalari	2024	English	Gopinath Krishnamoorthy	
Martial Arts Of India Pelwhan	2024	English	Gopinath Krishnamoorthy	
Martial Arts Of India Silamabam	2024	English	Gopinath Krishnamoorthy	
Mati Manas (The Mind of Clay)	1985	Hindi	Mani Kaul	
May I Think, Sir?	1983	English	Prakash Jha	
Menstrual Man	2013	Hindi, Tamil, English	Amit Virmani	
Mohor	1990	Hindi	Goutam Ghose	
Moving Perspectives	1964	English	Mrinal Sen	
My Mother: A Freudian introspection	1997	Bengali	Sandip Ray	
Mysteries of the Oracle: Unveiling Kodungallur Bharani	2025	English	Gopinath Krishnamoorthy	
Naga Story: The Other Side of Silence	2003	Nagamese, Meitei, English and 14 Naga languages	Gopal Menon	
Nature Symphony	1990	English	Shyam Benegal	
Nehru	1984	English	Shyam Benegal	
New Earth	1973	English	Goutam Ghose	
New Horizons in Steel	1977	English	Shyam Benegal	
Notes on the Green Revolution	1972	English	Shyam Benegal	
Ode to a Child	1979	English	Prakash Jha	
Parampara	1985	Hindi	Goutam Ghose	
Pas de deux	1981	English	Prakash Jha	
Power to the People	1972	English	Shyam Benegal	
Pregnant Silence: Conception of a Genius	1991	English	Sandip Ray	
Puppeteers of Rajasthan	1974	Hindi	Mani Kaul	
Quest for a Nation	1970	English	Shyam Benegal	
Rabindranath Tagore	1961	English	Satyajit Ray	
Racing The Bulls, Running With Time Kambala	2023	English	Gopinath Krishnamoorthy	
Raga and Melody	1972	English	Shyam Benegal	
Ram ke Naam	1992	Hindi, English	Anand Patwardhan	
Ramkinkar Baij	1975	Bengali	Ritwik Ghatak	
Reaching Out to People	1979	English	Shyam Benegal	
Reason	2019	English, Hindi	Anand Patwardhan	
Red Ant Dream	2013	Gondi, Odia, Punjabi	Sanjay Kak	
Rhythm Of The Oars - The Epic Boat Race	2025	English	Gopinath Krishnamoorthy	
Rhythms of a Land and Its People	1976	English	Prakash Jha	
Riding Solo to the Top of the World	2006	English	Gaurav Jani	
Rubaro Roshni	2019	Hindi	Aamir Khan Production	
Sachin: A Billion Dreams	2017	English, Marathi, Hindi	James Erskine	
Sangathan	1983	Hindi	Shyam Benegal	
Sange Meel Se Mulaqat (On Ustad Bismillah Khan)	1989	Hindi	Goutam Ghose	
Sarimen	2020	English	Qaushiq Mukherjee	
Satyajit Ray	1982	English, Bengali, Hindi	Shyam Benegal	
Shreevatsya	1983	English	Prakash Jha	
Siddeshwari	1990	Hindi	Mani Kaul	
Sikkim	1971	English	Satyajit Ray	
Silent Ghungroos	2006	English	Gauri Warudi	
Sinhasta, or The Path to Immortality	1968	English	Shyam Benegal	
Sonal	2002	Hindi	Prakash Jha	
Steel: A Whole New Way of Life	1971	English	Shyam Benegal	
Suee	2009	Hindi	Sai Paranjpye	
Suhani Sadak	1973	Hindi	Shyam Benegal	
Sukumar Ray	1987	Bengali	Satyajit Ray	
Swajaldhara	2002	Hindi	Nila Madhab Panda	
Tailing Pond	2020	English	Saurav Vishnu	
Tala and Rhythm	1971	English	Shyam Benegal	
Tata Steel: Seventy Five Years of the Indian Steel Industry	1983	English	Shyam Benegal	
Thariode	2020	Malayalam	Nirmal Baby Varghese	
The Bird of Time	1991	English	Goutam Ghose	
The Bleeding Goddess - Ambubachi Festival at Maa Khamika Temple	2025	English	Gopinath Krishnamoorthy	
The Burning Ghat Of Varanasi Manikarnika	2023	English	Gopinath Krishnamoorthy	
The House That Ananda Built	1968	English	Fali Bilimoria	
The Inner Eye	1972	English	Satyajit Ray	
The Little Tea Shop	1972	English	Sai Paranjpye	
The Pulsating Giant	1971	English	Shyam Benegal	
The Quiet Revolution - Part-1	1974	English	Shyam Benegal	
The Quiet Revolution - Part-2	1975	English	Shyam Benegal	
The Raag Imam Kalyan	1972	English	Shyam Benegal	
The Secret Lives Of Aghori Sadhus	2022	English	Gopinath Krishnamoorthy	
The Shruti and Graces of Indian Music	1972	English	Shyam Benegal	
Tomorrow Begins Today: Industrial Research	1976	English	Shyam Benegal	
Tripura Prasanga (About Tripura)	1982	Bengali	Mrinal Sen	
Valley of Hope - Amar Seva Sangam A Journey	2019	English, Tamil	Arin Paul	
Vande Mataram	1990	Bengali	Rituparno Ghosh	
Veenavaadanam	2008	Malayalam	Sathish Kalathil	
Violence: What Price? Who Pays? No. 5	1974	English	Shyam Benegal	
War and Peace	2002	English, Hindi	Anand Patwardhan	
Why Export?	1970	English	Shyam Benegal	
You Can Prevent Burns	1974	English	Shyam Benegal	
Zindagi Ek Safar (On Kishore Kumar)	1991	Hindi	Sandip Ray	
