= List of dams and reservoirs in Tamil Nadu =

This is a list of dams and reservoirs that are located in the Indian state of Tamil Nadu.

== List of dams and reservoirs in Tamil Nadu ==
Number	Name	Purpose	River	Nearest City	Location	Status	Completion Year	Type	Length (m)	Max Height above Foundation (m)	Refs
1	Aanaimaduvu reservoir	Irrigation	Anaimaduvu	Salem	11.7886°N 78.4315°E	Completed	1993	Earthen	670	27.94	
2	Adavinainarkovil Dam	Irrigation	Thamirabarani River	Tenkasi	Tirunelveli	Completed	2002	Gravity & Masonry	670	40.200	
3	Aliyar Reservoir	Hydroelectric, Irrigation	Aliyar River	Pollachi	10°28′56″N 76°58′4″E	Completed	1962	Earthen / Gravity & Masonry	3200	44.04	
4	Amaravathi Dam	Hydroelectric, Irrigation	Amaravati	Udumalaippettai	Tiruppur	Completed	1958	Earthen / Gravity & Masonry	1095	45	
5	Anaikuttam Dam	Irrigation	Arjuna Nadhi	Sattur	Virudhunagar	Completed	1989	Earthen	2940	9	
6	Andiappanur Odai Dam		Pambar	Vaniyambadi	Vellore	Completed	2007	-	1185	22.5	
7	Avalanche Dam	Hydroelectric	Avalanche & Emerald Streams	Udagamandalam	The Nilgiris	Completed	1961	Gravity & Masonry	366	57	
8	Barur Dam		Barur	Krishnagiri	Krishnagiri			-			
9	Berijam Lake		Kodiyetan Ar		Dindigul	Completed		-			
10	Bungihalla Bund		Bhavani	Uthagamandalam	The Nilgiris	Completed	1965	Earthen	280	23	
11	Chinnar Dam or panchapalli Dam	Irrigation and flood control	Chinnar	Palacode	Dharmapuri	Completed	1977	Earthen	365	29	
12	Chittar I Dam	Irrigation	Chittar	Vilavankod	Kanniyakumari	Completed	1970	Earthen	806	21.94	
13	Chittar II Dam	Irrigation	Chittar	Vilavankod	Kanniyakumari	Completed	1970	Earthen	1076	25	
14	East Varahapallam dam		East varahapallam	Uthamangalam	The Nilgiris	Completed	1967	Gravity & Masonry	173	18	
15	Emerald Dam	Hydroelectric	Emerald	Udagamandalam	The Nilgiris	Completed	1961	Gravity & Masonry	323	65	
16	Eravangalar Dam	Hydroelectric	Eravangalar	Uttamapalaiyam	Theni	Completed	1978	Gravity & Masonry	242	30	
17	Gatana Dam	Irrigation	Gatana nadhi	Ambasamudram	Tirunelveli	Completed	1974	Earthen	1628	32.92	
18	Glenmorgan	Hydroelectric	Glenmorgan St	Uthagamandalam	The Nilgiris	Completed	1930	Gravity & Masonry	80	16	
19	Glenmorgan Forbay Dam	Hydroelectric		Udagamandalam	The Nilgiris	Completed	1930	Gravity & Masonry	80	16	
20	Golwarpatti Dam		Arujuna & Gowsiha	Sattur	Virudhunagar	Completed	1993	-	5700	15.9	
21	Gomukhinadi Dam	Irrigation	Gomukhinadhi	Kallakkurichchi	Viluppuram	Completed	1965	Earthen	2103	24.83	
22	Gundar Dam	Irrigation	Gundar	Sengottai	Tirunelveli	Completed	1983	Earthen / Gravity & Masonry	389.9	14.66	
23	Highwavys Dam	Hydroelectric	Highwavys St.	Uttamapalaiyam	Theni	Completed	1978	Earthen / Gravity & Masonry	175	35	
24	Irukkangudi Dam	Irrigation	Vaippar, Arjuna	Sattur	Virudhunagar	Completed	2009	Earthen	1850	8.85	
25	Kadamparai Dam	Hydroelectric	Kadambarai	Pollachi	Coimbatore	Completed	1984	Earthen / Gravity & Masonry	808	67.5	
26	Kamraju Sagar (Sandy Nalla) Dam		Sandynallah	Uthagamandalam	The Nilgiris	Completed	1963	Earthen / Gravity & Masonry	107	36	
27	Kariakoil Dam	Irrigation	Kariakovil	Attur	Salem	Completed	1993	Earthen	708	31	
28	Karuppanadhi Dam	Irrigation	Karuppanadhi	Tenkasi	Tirunelveli	Completed	1977	Earthen / Gravity & Masonry	890	34.44	
29	Kelavarapalli Dam	Irrigation	Ponniar	Hosur	Krishnagiri	Completed	1993	Earthen	547	13.5	
30	Kesarigulihalla Dam	Irrigation	K.gulihalla	Palakodu	Dharmapuri	Completed	1985	Earthen	1672	16.74	
31	Kodaganar Dam	Irrigation		Vedasandur	Dindigul	Completed	1993	Earthen / Gravity & Masonry	2893	12.75	
32	Kodumudiyar Dam	Irrigation	Nambiyar	Nanguneri	Tirunelveli	Completed	2003	Earthen / Gravity & Masonry	411	28	
33	Krishnagiri Dam	Irrigation	Ponniar	Krishnagiri	Krishnagiri	Completed	1958	Earthen / Gravity & Masonry	990.59	29.26	
34	Kullursandai Dam	Irrigation	Vaippar	Aruppukottai	Virudhunagar	Completed	1984	Earthen	3207	8	
35	Kundah Palam Dam	Hydroelectric	Kundah	Udagamandalam	The Nilgiris	Completed	1961	Gravity & Masonry	152	32	
36	Kunderipallam Dam		Kunderipallam	Sathyamangalam	Erode	Completed	1978	Earthen	627	17.7	
37	Kuppanatham Dam		Cheyyar	Chengam	Tiruvannamalai	Completed		-	750	25.2	
38	Kuthiraiyar Dam	Irrigation	Kuthiraiyar	Palani	Dindigul	Completed	1990	Earthen / Gravity & Masonry	899.9	27.38	
39	Kuttiyadi (Augmentation Main ) (Padinjarethara)	Hydroelectric	Karamenthodu	Wynad	Kozhikode	Completed	2004	Earthen	628	38	
40	Kuttiyar Dam		Kuttiyar		Kanniyakumari	Completed		-	93	25	
41	Lower Bhavani Dam	Hydroelectric, Irrigation	Bhavani	Sathyamangalam	Erode	Completed	1955	Earthen / Gravity & Masonry	8797	62	
42	Lower Kodayar Dam	Hydroelectric	Kodayar	Vilavankod	Kanniyakumari	Completed	1972	Gravity & Masonry	152	61	
43	Lower Nirar Dam	Hydroelectric, Irrigation	Nirar	Pollachi	Coimbatore	Completed	1982	Earthen / Gravity & Masonry	188.97	50.29	
44	Mambazhathuraiyar		Mambazhathuraiyar	Kanyakumari	Kanniyakumari	Completed	2011	Earthen / Gravity ↔& Masonry	360	24	
45	Manalar Dam	Hydroelectric	Manalar	Uttamapalaiyam	Theni	Completed	1978	Gravity & Masonry	185	40	
46	Manimukthanadhi Dam	Flood Control, Irrigation	Manimuktha	Kallakkurichchi	Viluppuram	Completed	1970	Earthen	3618	21	
47	Manimuthar Dam	Irrigation	Manimuthur	Ambasamudram	Tirunelveli	Completed	1958	Earthen / Gravity & Masonry	2825	45.72	
48	Manjalar Dam	Irrigation	Manjalar	Periyakulam	Theni	Completed	1967	Earthen	1043	28.33	
49	Maravakandi Forbay Dam	Hydroelectric	Aravarihalla	Udagamandalam	The Nilgiris	Completed	1947	Earthen / Gravity & Masonry	415	22	
50	Marlimund Reservoir	Drinking water	11.43013°N 76.697552°E	Ooty		Completed	1870				
51	Marudhanadi Dam	Irrigation	Maurdhanadhi	Dindigul	Dindigul	Completed	1979	Earthen	808	27.43	
52	Mettur Dam	Hydroelectric, Irrigation	Kaveri	Mettur	Salem	Completed	1934	Gravity & Masonry	1615.44	70.41	
53	Mirugandanadhi Dam			Polur	Tiruvannamalai	Completed		-			
54	Mordhana Dam	Irrigation	Koundanyanadhi	Gudiyattam	Vellore	Completed	2001	Gravity & Masonry	475	23.89	
55	Moyar Forebay Dam	Hydroelectric		Udagamandalam	The Nilgiris	Completed	1951	Earthen / Gravity & Masonry	731	22	
56	Mukurthy Dam		Mukurthi	Udagamandalam	The Nilgiris	Completed	1938	-	162	34	
57	Nagavathi Dam	Irrigation	Nagavathy	Dharmapuri	Dharmapuri	Completed	1986	Earthen	306	15.81	
58	Nallathangal Odai Dam		Nallathangal Odai	Dharapuram	Tiruppur	Completed	2007	-	3450	22	
59	Nambiar Dam	Irrigation	Nambiar	Radhapuram	Tirunelveli	Completed	2004	Earthen	2605	10.84	
60	Nanganjiyar Dam	Irrigation	Nanganjiyar	Oddanchatram	Dindigul	Completed	2007	Gravity & Masonry	2680	21.5	
61	Nilayur Bed Dam	Irrigation	Vagai		Manamadurai	Completed		Earthen			
62	Noyyal Athupalayam Dam	Irrigation	Noyyal	Karur	Karur	Completed	1992	Earthen	2850	14.06	
63	Noyyal Orathupalayam Dam	Irrigation	Noyyal	Dharapuram	Tiruppur	Completed	1992	Earthen	2290	21.7	
64	Palar Porundalar Dam	Irrigation	PalarPorundalar	Palani	Dindigul	Completed	1978	Earthen	2451	32	
65	Pambar Dam	Flood Control, Irrigation	Pambar	Uttangarai	Krishnagiri	Completed	1983	Earthen	652	16.5	
66	Papanasam Dam	Hydroelectric	Thambraparani	Ambasamudram	Tirunelveli	Completed	1944	Gravity & Masonry	409	18	
67	Parappalar Dam	Irrigation	Parappalar	Oddanchatram	Dindigul	Completed	1974	Gravity & Masonry	81.07	39.62	
68	Parson's Valley Dam	Hydroelectric	Parson Valley Stream	Udagamandalam	The Nilgiris	Completed	1966	Gravity & Masonry	146	43	
69	Pechiparai Dam	Irrigation	Kodaiyar	Vilavankod	Kanniyakumari	Completed	1906	Gravity & Masonry	555	46.32	
70	Pegumbahallah Forebay Dam	Hydroelectric	Pengumbahallh	Udagamandalam	The Nilgiris	Completed	1965	Gravity & Masonry	181	55	
71	Periyar Forebay		Vairavanar	Theni	Theni	Completed	1958	Gravity & Masonry	88	38	
72	Perumpallam Dam		Perumpalam	Sathyamangalam	Erode	Completed		-	2060	17.09	
73	Perunchani Dam	Irrigation	Paralayar		Kanniyakumari	Completed	1952	Gravity & Masonry	308	36.27	
74	Pilavukkal Kovilar Dam		Kovilar	Usilampatti	Virudhunagar	Completed		-	639.27	16	
75	Pilavukkal Periyar Dam		Periyar	Srivilliputtur	Virudhunagar	Completed		-	864	17	
76	Pillur Dam	Hydroelectric	Bhavani	Mettuppalaiyam	Coimbatore	Completed	1967	Gravity & Masonry	357	88	
77	Poigaiyar Dam	Irrigation	Poigai	Tovala	Kanniyakumari	Completed	2000	Earthen	2290	24	
78	Ponnaniar Dam	Irrigation	Ponnaniyar	Kulittalai	Karur	Completed	1974	Earthen / Gravity & Masonry	246.81	24.84	
79	Poondi Dam	Irrigation	Kosasthalaiyar	Tiruvallur	Thiruvallur	Completed	1944	Earthen	3856	12.27	
80	Porthimund Dam	Hydroelectric	Porthimund St	Udagamandalam	The Nilgiris	Completed	1966	Gravity & Masonry	335	56	
81	Puthen Dam	Irrigation	Kodayar		Kanniyakumari	Completed		-			
82	Pykara Dam			Udagamandalam	The Nilgiris	Completed		-	193.5	56	
83	Rajathope Kanar Dam	Irrigation	Rajathopekanar	Chittoor	Chittoor	Completed	1997	Gravity & Masonry	260		
84	Ramanadhi Dam	Irrigation	Ramanadhi	Ambasamudram	Tirunelveli	Completed	1974	Earthen / Gravity & Masonry	836.57	31.09	
85	Sathanur Dam	Hydroelectric, Irrigation	Ponniar	Chengam	Tiruvannamalai	Completed	1958	Earthen / Gravity & Masonry	786.37	44.81	
86	Sathiyar		Sathaiyaru	Madurai	Madurai	Completed	1965	Earthen / Gravity & Masonry	409.63	14.93	
87	Servalar Dam	Hydroelectric, Irrigation	Servalar/ Tambiraparani	Ambasamudram	Tirunelveli	Completed	1986	Gravity & Masonry	465	57	
88	Shanmuganadhi Dam			Uttamapalaiyam	Theni	Completed	2004	-			
89	Shenbagathope Dam	Irrigation	Kamandalar	Polur	Tiruvannamalai	Completed	2007	Earthen	1015	26.6	
90	Sholayar Dam	Hydroelectric, Irrigation	Sholayar	Pollachi	Coimbatore	Completed	1971	Earthen / Gravity & Masonry	1244.18	105.16	
91	Shoolagiri Chinnar Dam	Irrigation	Shoolagiri Chinnar	Hosur	Krishnagiri	Completed	1986	Earthen	415	25.3	
92	Siddhamalli Dam	Irrigation		Udaiyarpalaiyam	Ariyalur	Completed	1987	Earthen	5050	15.15	
93	Sothupparai Dam	Irrigation	Varaganadhi	Periyakulam	Theni	Completed	2001	Gravity & Masonry	320	57.64	
94	Thirumurthi Dam	Irrigation	Palar	Udumalaippettai	Tiruppur	Completed	1967	Earthen	2628	34.14	
95	Thoppaiyar Dam	Irrigation	Thoppaiyar	Dharmapuri	Dharmapuri	Completed	1986	Earthen	435	19.75	
96	Thumblahalli Dam	Flood Control, Irrigation	Pulapatti	Palakodu	Dharmapuri	Completed	1983	Earthen	1054	12.6	
97	Uppar( Erode) Dam		Uppar	Dharapuram	Tiruppur	Completed	1968	Earthen / Gravity & Masonry	2256	19.81	
98	Upper Aliyar Dam	Hydroelectric	Aliyar	Pollachi	Coimbatore	Completed	1971	Gravity & Masonry	315	81	
99	Upper Bhavani Dam	Hydroelectric	Bhavani	Udagamandalam	The Nilgiris	Completed	1965	Gravity & Masonry	419	80	
100	Upper Kodayar Dam	Hydroelectric	Kodayar		Kanniyakumari	Completed	1972	Gravity & Masonry	166	88	
101	Upper Kodayar Diversion dam		Kodayar		Kanniyakumari	Completed		-			
102	Vadakku Paichaiyar Dam	Irrigation	Vadakkupaichaiyar	Nanguneri	Tirunelveli	Completed	2003	Earthen	3115	20.1	
103	Vaigai Dam	Hydroelectric, Irrigation	Vaigai	Periyakulam	Theni	Completed	1959	Earthen / Gravity & Masonry	3474	33.83	
104	Vaniar Dam	Irrigation	Vaniar	Harur	Dharmapuri	Completed	1985	Earthen	1136	31	
105	Varadhamanadhi Dam		Varadhamanadhi	Palani	Dindugal Anna	Completed	1978	Earthen	297	26	
106	Varattar Dam	Irrigation		Harur	Dharmapuri	Completed	2005	Earthen / Gravity & Masonry	1136	31.17	
107	Varattupallam Dam	Irrigation	Varattupallam	Bhavani	Erode	Completed	1978	Earthen	1798	15.5	
108	Vattamalaikarai Odai Dam	Irrigation	V.K. Odai	Dharapuram	Tiruppur	Completed	1978	Earthen	1820	20	
109	Vembakottai Dam	Irrigation		Sattur	Virudhunagar	Completed	1985	Earthen	3216	9.7	
110	Vennir-Ar Dam		Vennirar	Chinnamanur	idukki	Completed	1978	Gravity & Masonry	96	29	
111	Vidur Dam	Irrigation	Varahanadi	Tindivanam	Viluppuram	Completed	1959	Earthen	4380	22.55	
112	West Varahapallam Weir Dam		W.V.Pallam	Uthagamandalam	Nilgiri	Completed	1967	Gravity & Masonry	92	35	
113	Western Catchment No. I Dam	Hydroelectric	Arickyampuzha	Uthagamandalam	Nilgiri	Completed	1966	Gravity & Masonry	72	18	
114	Western Catchment No. II Dam	Hydroelectric	Karampuzha	Uthagamandalam	Nilgiri	Completed	1966	Gravity & Masonry	85	30	
115	Western Catchment No. III Dam	Hydroelectric	Karampuzha	Uthagamandalam	Nilgiri	Completed	1966	Gravity & Masonry	92	26	
116	Willington Dam (எமனேரி)	Irrigation	vellaru river main water storage source for this dam.	Ivanur, Tittagudi	Cuddalore	Completed	1923	Earthen	4023	17.22	
117	Thervoy Kandigai Dam	Drinking Water	Krishna river main water storage source for this dam.	Thervoy Kandigai, Kannankottai	Tiruvallur	Completed	2020	Earthen	8.6 km	13	
118	Visvakudi Dam	Irrigation	Kallar river main water storage source for this dam.	Visvakudi, Veppanthattai	Perambalur	Completed	2015	Earthen	615	13	
119	Kottarai dam	Irrigation	Maruthaiyar river main water storage source for this dam.	Kottarai, Adhanur	Perambalur	Nearing Completion	2021	Earthen			
120	Therkku Karunkulam Dam	Irrigation and Drinking Water	Karunkulam Western ghot storage source for this dam. Sprawling lake for storage of rainwater and supply of drinking water to 15 village Panchayats in the region.	T Karunkulam, Near Palazor	Tirunelveli Dist	To be completed on	2022	Earthen			
