= About Love =

About Love may refer to:

- "About Love" (short story), an 1898 Russian short story by Anton Chekhov
- About Love (album), 2009, by the Plastiscines
- "About Love" (song), 2020, by Marina
- About Love (1970 film), a Soviet romantic drama film
- About Love (2005 film), a Taiwanese-Japanese-Chinese anthology film
- About Love (2015 film), a Russian romantic comedy
- About Love (2019 film), an Indian documentary by Archana Atul Phadke
- "About Love", a song by Red Velvet from Perfect Velvet
- About Love, a 1980 album by Gladys Knight & the Pips
