= Shrenik Rao =

Indian film-maker

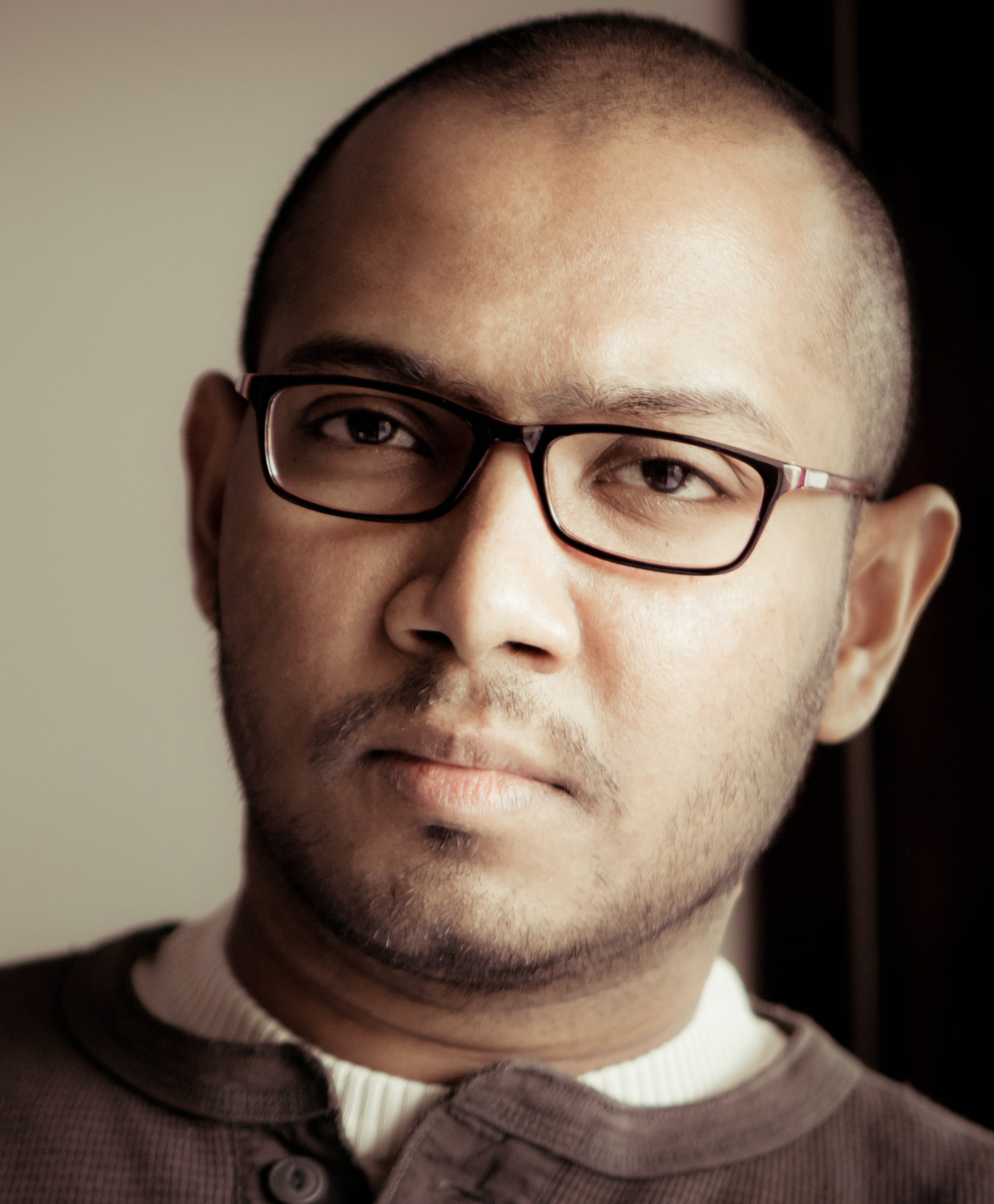
- Born: Shrenik Rao; India
- Education: London School of Economics
- Occupations: Director, producer, screenwriter
- Years active: 2007–present
- Parents: Vijayalakshmi Rao (née Tavitiki); N Prabhakar Rao

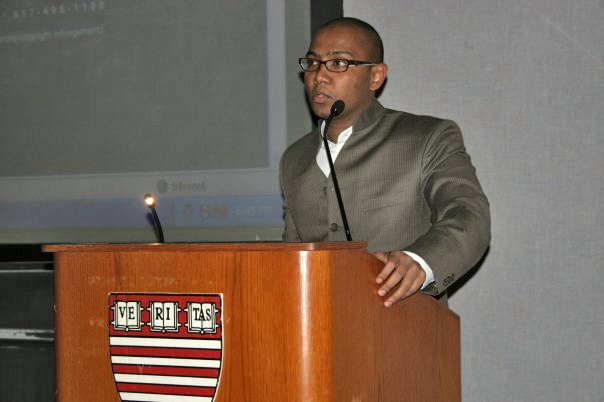
Shrenik Rao at Harvard University, 2007.

Shrenik Rao is an Indian film-maker, academic, and broadcaster. He is the founder and chief executive of Dolsun Media (2005) and 7MB – 7 Media Broadcasting Pvt Ltd (2010). He was a Fellow at the University of Oxford’s Reuters Institute for the Study of Journalism (2016) & an alumnus of the London School of Economics.

He wrote, directed, and produced the documentary films Denied – This Bit of Truth, Mugabe's Zimbabwe, 7 Notes to Infinity and The Monsoon Oracle, which have been distributed to 52 countries around the world.

== Films ==
The global premier of his first factual film titled Denied – This Bit of Truth took place at The London School of Economics in October 2007 and was quickly followed by a premier at Harvard University's Kennedy School of Government in November 2007. The factual film has also been featured on BBC World Service's Outlook.

He created an environmental initiative in association with United Nations Environment Programme for which he cycled for 4800 kilometres from Kanyakumari, the southernmost tip of India to Kashmir – India's northernmost state. Along his journey, he gathered pledges for planting trees to spread environmental awareness about offsetting the effects of global warming. This epic journey was made into a six-part Television series titled TreeCycle with Shrenik Rao which has been licensed to Gaiam TV in the United States, Canada and Puerto Rico. Snippets of his journey were broadcast on NDTV. The series also features celebrated authors, environmentalists and other prominent personalities such as Maneka Gandhi, Shashi Tharoor, Gurcharan Das, Daggubati Purandeswari and Sunita Narain.

His factual film titled Mugabe's Zimbabwe, charts three decades of Robert Mugabe's rule as the President of Zimbabwe. The film examines Mugabe's transition from liberator to dictator, and of Zimbabwe from a state of hope to one of desolation. The film was taken up for worldwide distribution by TVF International and was featured as one of the 'Hot Picks of 2011' by Real Screen at Cannes. The film was critically acclaimed by media across the world and translated to multiple languages. Pulitzer Prize–winning journalist Barry Bearak of the New York Times wrote,

'The film seems a primer to the situation, something of value especially to those not yet familiar with Zimbabwe and its recent history'.

In 2012, Rao produced and directed 7 Notes to Infinity, a musical factual film which pays tribute to Indian Classical Music. It tries to explore the universality of music through infinite musical compositions created from 7 Notes to the scale – Sa Re Ga Ma Pa Da Ni. Legendary musicians, the likes of "Chevalier of the Ordre des Arts et des Lettres" – Dr M. Balamuralikrishna, Padma Bhushan, T.V.Gopalakrishnan, Prince of the Royal family of Travancore, Aswathi Thirunal Rama Varma, the direct descendant of the great king Maharaja Swathi Thirunal and Sanjay Subrahmanyan feature prominently in the film. The film was produced and launched on the World Music day in Kerala, in association with Saptaparani and State Bank of Travancore.

He produced and directed The Monsoon Oracle, a factual film on the ritualistic practices performed every year in Hyderabad to predict the Monsoons and keep infectious diseases at bay. The film focuses on people who dedicate their lives to playing the role of oracle to the goddess or to the role of Pothuraju, the goddess's whip wielding brother. The film narrates stories of hope, faith and uncertainty and presents the psychological and emotional dimensions of assuming these roles.

The Monsoon Oracle has been critically acclaimed and screened at the Massachusetts Institute of Technology and University of Chicago.

== Early life and education ==
He earned his master's degree from the London School of Economics specialising in political communication and new media information and knowledge systems. His first master's degree was in anthropology from the University of Hyderabad, where he was awarded the University Gold Medal and University Merit Scholarship for Academic Excellence.

== Career ==
Prior to founding Dolsun Media and 7MB, Rao worked as the vice-president (programming) at MAA TV Network Pvt Ltd, where he conceptualised and worked on several top-rated shows.

Rao also taught 'Information and Politics', 'International Media Development', 'Information Communication and Society', 'Information Technology and Communication' to Masters level students at Napier University, Edinburgh, UK. He has given guest lectures at the University of Westminster, London, UK and at the University of Hyderabad, India, Indian School of Business, Microsoft (India) and so on. He was also associated with the Indian School of Business, where he was instrumental in conceptualising and creating a digital content platform called 'ISB Knowledge 360'.

In 2008, he was awarded the Karmaveer Puraskaar, a high civilian honour, for commitment to Social Justice and the Environment.

In October 2016 Rao revived the Madras Courier as an online publication.

== Ad-Films ==
Rao has made several ad-films. Prominent among them are 'APIIC' Andhra Pradesh Industrial Infrastructure Corporation and 'Experience Himachal Pradesh', for Ministry of Tourism, Government of India.

As part of his productions, he has interviewed several heads of states and prominent personalities.

== Filmography ==
Year	Film
2013	The Monsoon Oracle
2012	7 Notes to Infinity
2011	TreeCycle with Shrenik Rao
2010	Mugabe's Zimbabwe
2007	Denied – This bit of Truth
