= Red ant (disambiguation) =

Red ant is another name for the fire ant, several species of stinging ants.

Red ant may also refer to:

- Red harvester ant, Pogonomyrmex barbatus
- Red Ant Enterprises, an Australian video game developer
- Red Ants, a musical collaboration by Modulok (rapper) and Vincent Price
- Red Ant Dream, a 2013 documentary film
- Trichomyrmex destructor are not red ants .Indians confuse Trichomyrmex destructor ants with fire/red ants.
- Red ant chutney, an Indian condiment made from red weaver ants, which Indians confuse with fire/red ants.
