= Tapan Bose =

Indian documentary filmmaker and peace activist (1946–2025)

- Born: Tapan Kumar Bose; 8 June 1946; West Bengal, India
- Died: 30 January 2025 (aged 78); New Delhi, India
- Education: Delhi University
- Occupations: Filmmaker; journalist; human rights activist
- Notable work: An Indian Story; Bhopal: Beyond Genocide; Behind the Barricades — Punjab
- Awards: National Film Awards (in 1982 & 1987)

Tapan Kumar Bose (8 June 1946 – 30 January 2025) was an Indian documentary filmmaker, human rights activist and journalist. He was known for his work on issues such as social justice, civil liberties and peace in South Asia. He was a founding member and secretary general of the South Asia Forum for Human Rights (SAFHR). He was also a co-founder of the Pakistan-India Peoples' Forum for Peace and Democracy (PIPFPD).

Born in 1946, he started his career as a journalist and later turned to documentary filmmaking under the influence of filmmaker S. Sukhdev. During 1970s, his work centered on documenting issues related to human rights, state-led violences, and systemic injustices. His documentaries such as An Indian Story (1981), Bhopal: Beyond Genocide (1986), Behind the Barricades — Punjab (1993), The Vulnerable Road User (1999) and Jharkhand — The Struggle of the Indian Indigenous People (2003), explored themes of state violence and indigenous struggles and were screened at various international film festivals.

== Career and activism ==
In 1970s, Bose began his filmmaking career during emergency period. Using the documentary medium, he often covered political conflict regions such as Punjab and Jammu & Kashmir. His work gained recognition for its role in documenting human rights abuses and insurgent violence.

In 1982, he directed documentary An Indian Story based on the 1980 Bhagalpur blindings in which 31 men were blinded by police during under trial. His 1993 documentary Behind the Barricades – Punjab faced major censorship hurdles. Initially denied certification by the Examining Committee, the film was accused of promoting separatist agenda and of portraying security forces in a highly critical manner. Legal scholar A. G. Noorani criticized the process, arguing that the entire censorship system lacks transparency and tends to operate within a rigid, illiberal framework.

Throughout his career, he made several documentaries that highlighted critical issues such as the social unrest in Jharkhand, the Bhopal gas tragedy survivors, Godhra incident and the demolition of the Babri Masjid.

Apart from his filmmaking career, he actively involved in peace activism. He co-founded several key initiatives, including the Pakistan–India Peoples' Forum for Peace and Democracy, the South Asia Forum for Human Rights, and the Rohingya Human Rights Initiative. He was also a founding member of the Southasia Peace Action Network (Sapan).

== Death ==
Bose died on 30 January 2025 at his residence in New Delhi. On his demise, the Naga Students' Federation (NSF) mourned his death and extended condolences to his family, the chairman of Hurriyat Conference, Mirwaiz Umar Farooq, also expressed sorrow, calling him a fearless voice for justice and human rights, and a dear friend of Kashmir.

== Selected filmography ==
Bose selected documentaries are listed below:

- An Indian Story (1981)
- Bhopal: Beyond Genocide (1986)
- Behind the Barricades — Punjab (1993)
- The Vulnerable Road User (1999)
- Jharkhand — The Struggle of the Indian Indigenous People (2003)

== Awards and recognition ==
- An Indian Story received the National Film Award for Best Information Film in 1982.
- In 1987 his documentary Beyond Genocide: Bhopal Gas Tragedy won the 35th National award in category of the Best Non-Fiction Film.

== See also ==
- List of Indian documentary films
