= The Monsoon Oracle =

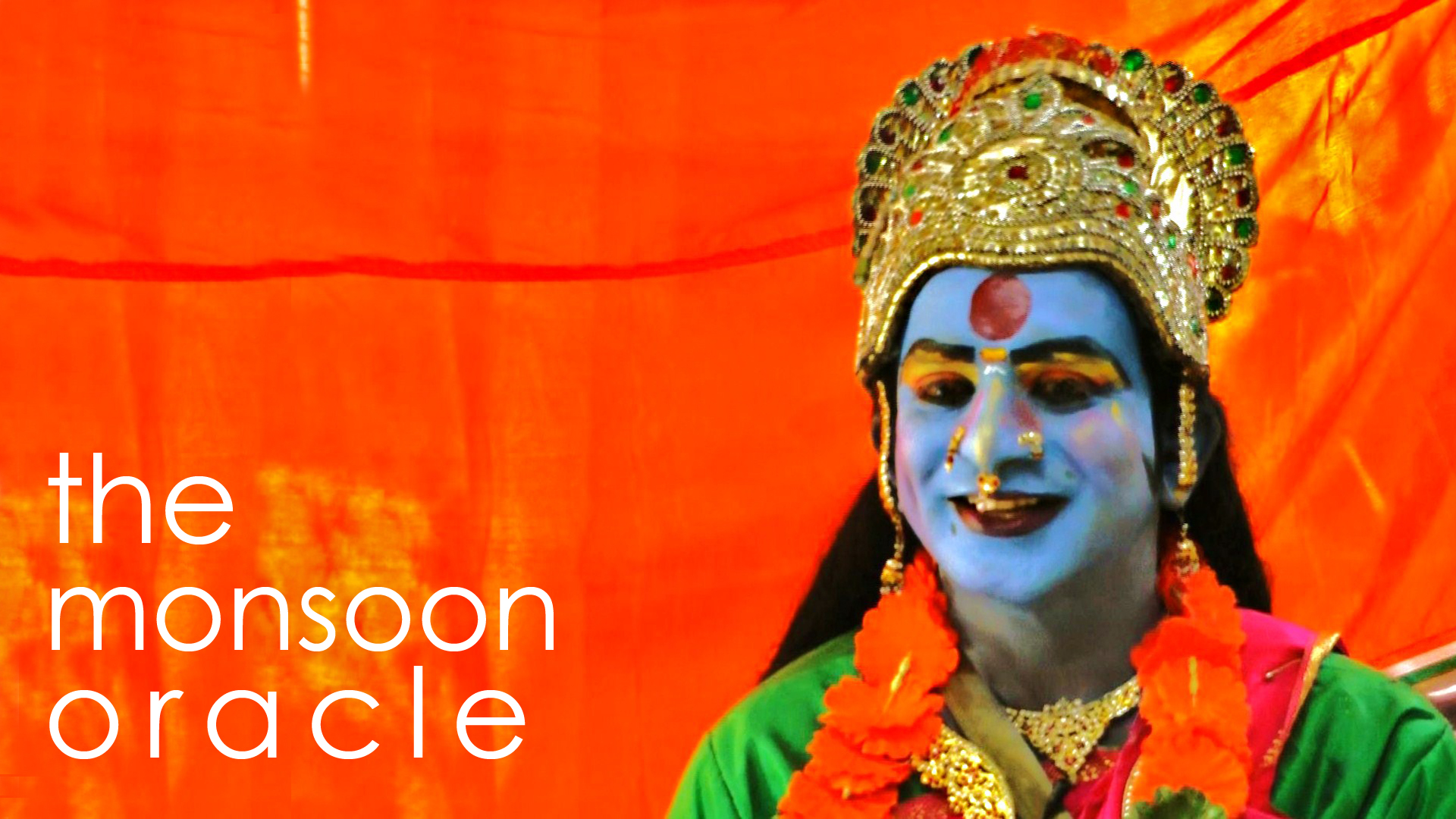
- The Monsoon Oracle Cover
- Directed by: Shrenik Rao
- Release date: 25 January 2013
- Running time: 60 minutes
- Country: India
- Languages: Telugu; English

The Monsoon Oracle is a 2013 documentary film directed by Shrenik Rao.

== Synopsis ==
The Monsoon Oracle is an intimate portrayal of the central festival of Telangana, called Bonalu. It narrates stories of women and men who dedicate their lives to enacting the roles the Hindu goddess Mahankali's oracles and to the role of Pothuraju, the goddess's whip wielding brother.

It presents an insight into ritualistic practices that are performed every year in India in the hope of a bountiful Monsoon and explores the emotional and psychological dimensions of these annual role enactments. Their stories reveal the relationship between the effective charge of a religious crowd and an extreme form of animal sacrifice.

The Film also delves into themes of modernization, commercialization, and politicization of religion in modern India. The dialogue in the film takes place in TelanganaTelugu with English subtitles. The narration is in English.

In an Interview with Deccan Chronicle, Shrenik said

"It's about people, their stories, their tradition of predicting monsoons and the oracles. The idea germinated as I watched a report on a local news channel. I decided to pursue it because of the contrast the traditions offered against the backdrop of a high tech Hyderabad".

The Monsoon Oracle has been critically acclaimed and screened at Massachusetts Institute of Technology(MIT) and at the University of Chicago.
