= Ooty Racecourse =

Horse racecourse in Ooty, India

Coordinates: 11.4028°N 76.7004°E

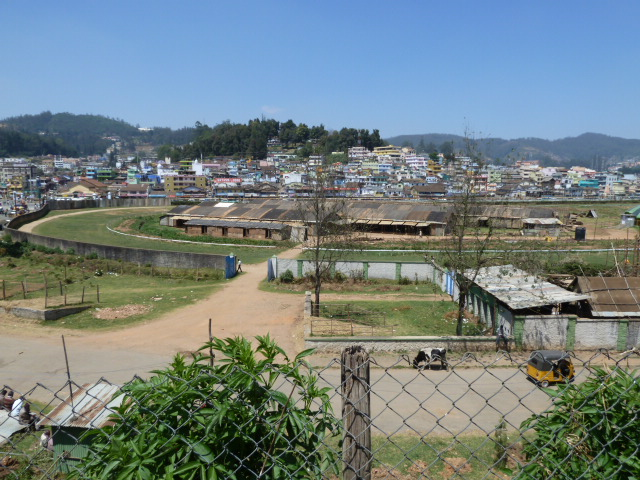
View of race course

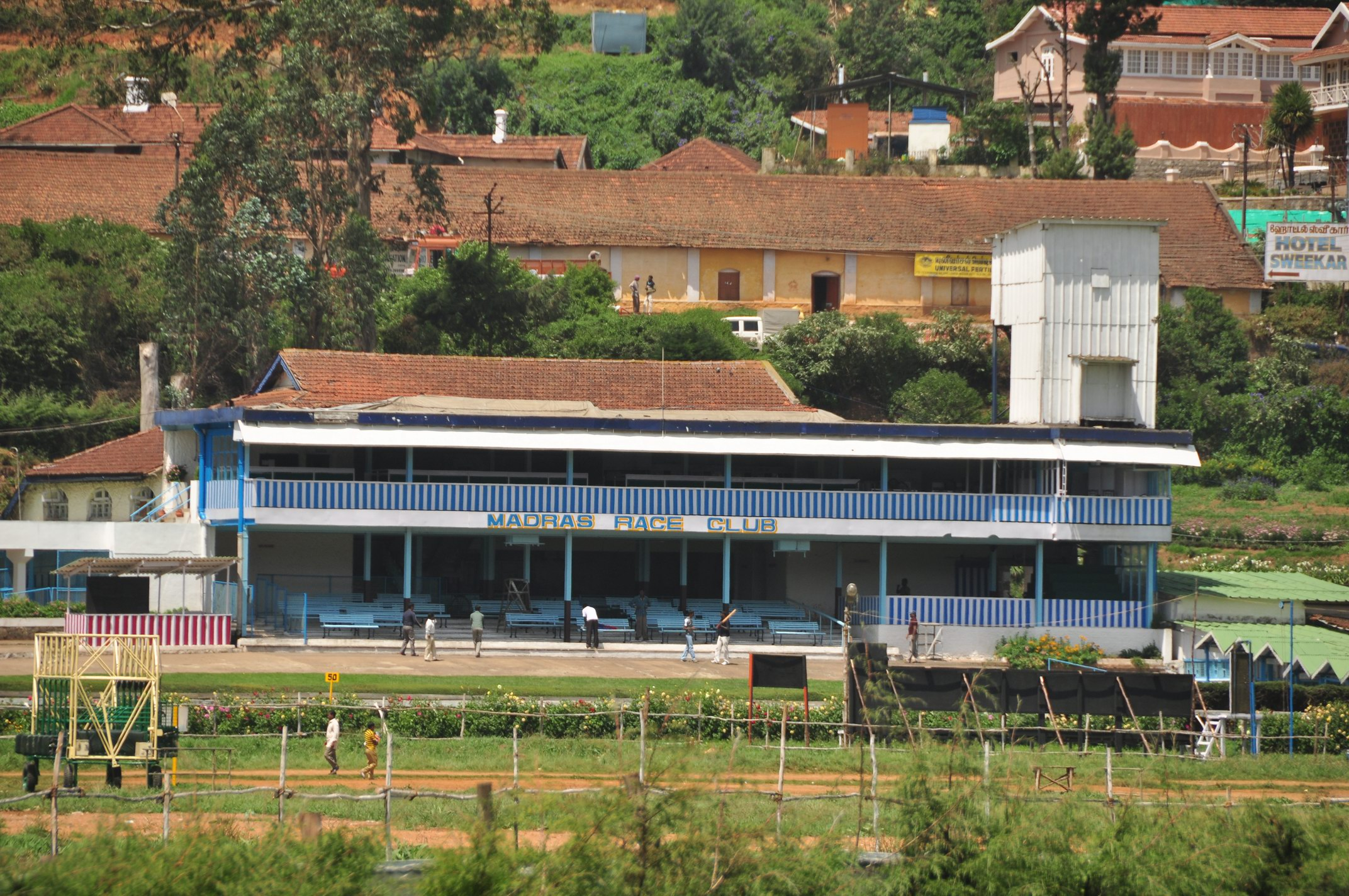
View of race course

Ooty Racecourse is a highland race course in Ooty, Nilgiris district, Tamil Nadu. Built for summer racing in the hills, the course stands at an altitude of 2,268 m (7,441 ft) above sea level. The race course is adjacent to the railway station in the heart of town.

Horse races are conducted in the summer season, from April to June, when it has been traditional to come to the hill station to escape the summer heat. The course occupies over 55 acres in the centre of Ooty. The course is about 2.4 km long. The main event of the racing season is "The Nilgiri Gold Cup Race". To commemorate 125 years of racing in this hill station, a special race for "The Post Centenary Silver Jubilee Cup" was run in 2011, and creating a garden is under discussion.

A fire occurred at the race course in March 2011, believed to have been started by a cigarette butt, but was put out without harm to the horses.
