= Ooty varkey =

Crispy vegetarian snack native to the Nilgiri district, Tamil Nadu, India

Ooty Varkey
- Type: Cookies
- Place of origin: India
- Region or state: The Nilgiris
- Main ingredients: Wheat flour
- Variations: Sweet, Salt

Ooty varkey is a crispy vegetarian snack that is native to the Nilgiri district in Tamil Nadu, India. The varkey is named after Ooty, the popular hill station in the region. It is made from wheat flour mixed with mava along with ghee, vegetable oil and spices. Mava is made of banana, rava, and sugar. There are more than 90 bakers in the region who manufacture the same. In 2015, efforts were initiated by the Ooty Bakery Owners Association to obtain a Geographical indication. Ooty varkey was accorded GI tag in 2022-23.
