= Ooty =

Hill station in Tamil Nadu, India

Ooty Ootacamund
- Town
- Udagamandalam
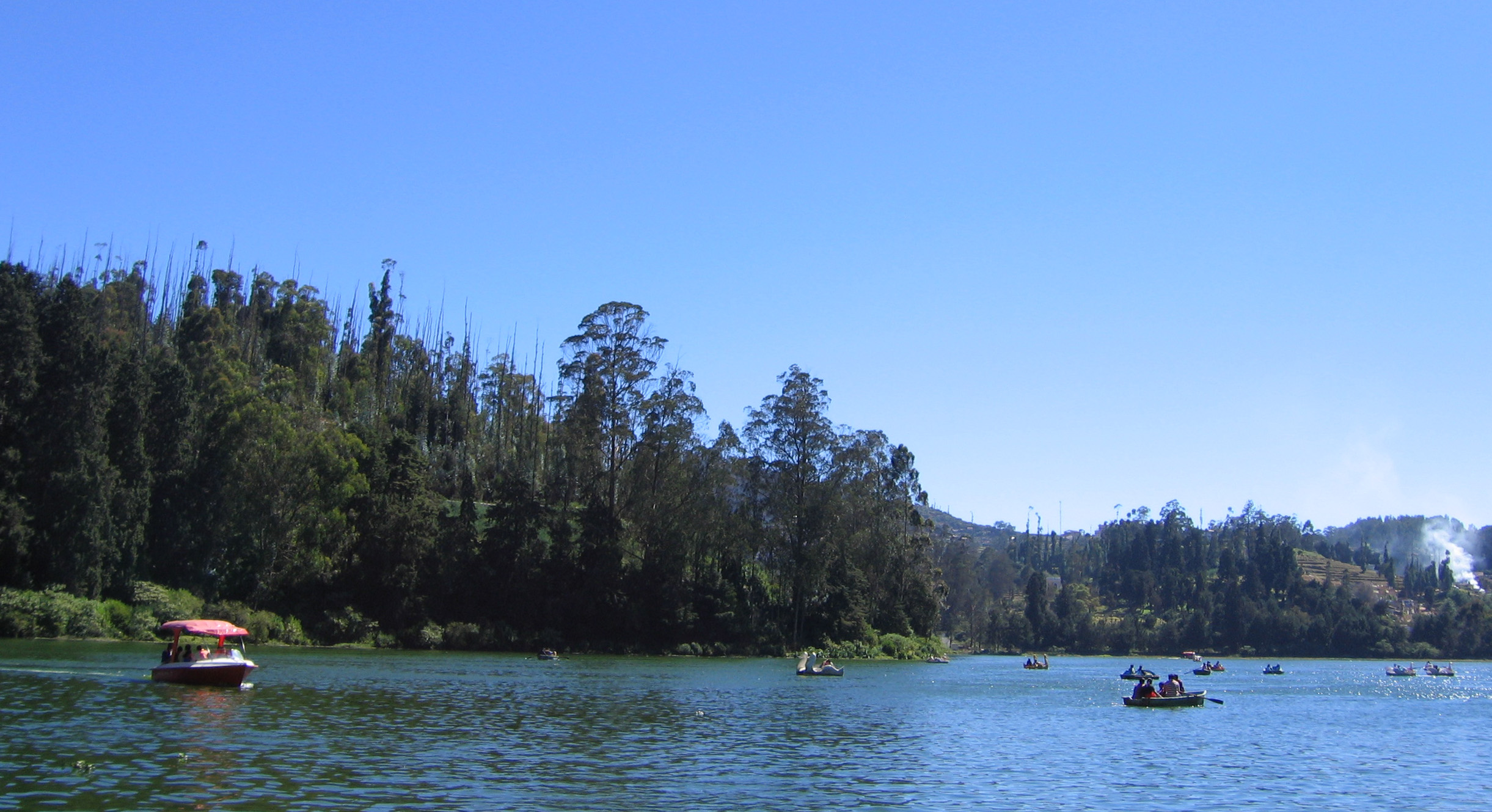
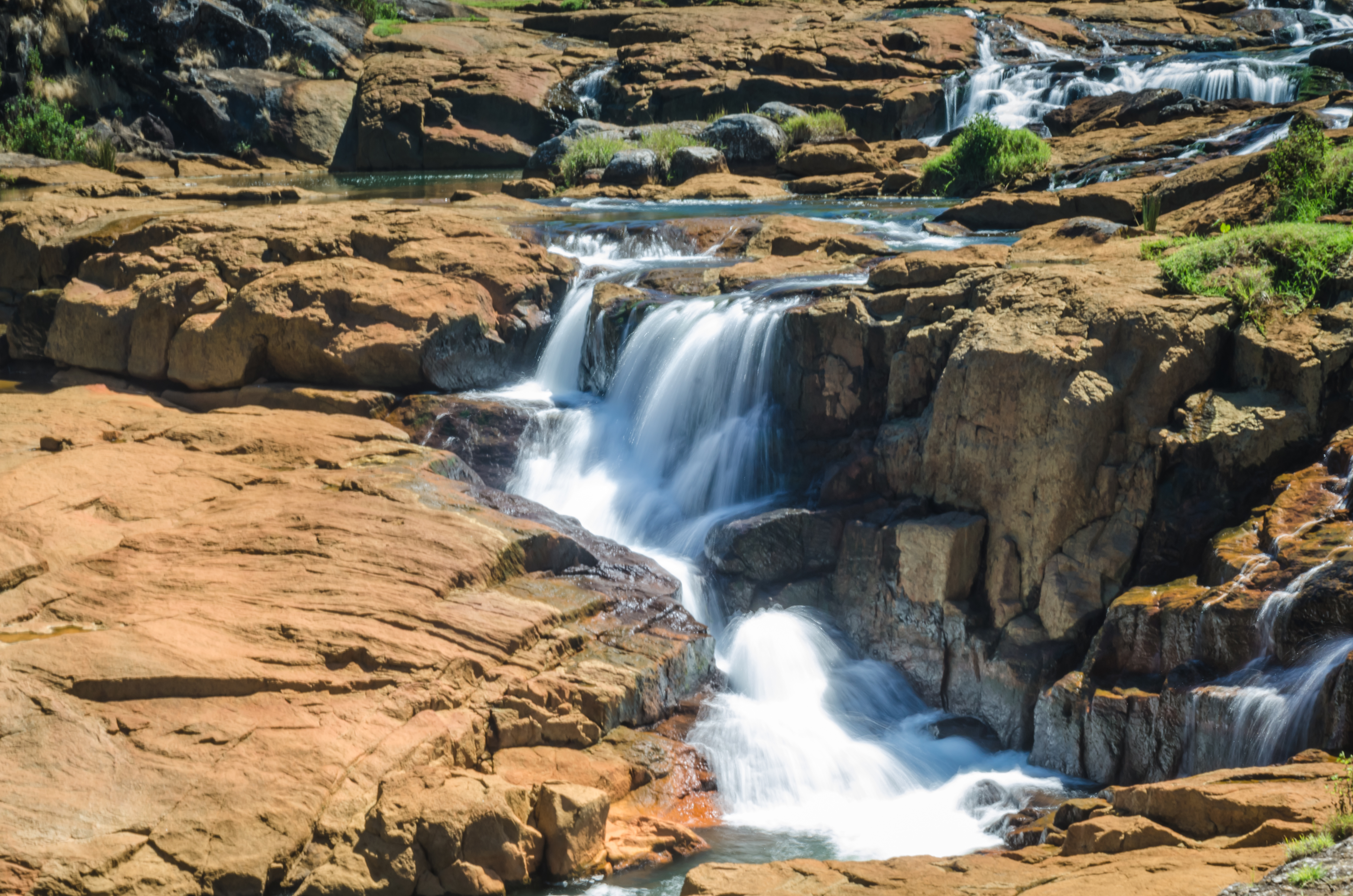
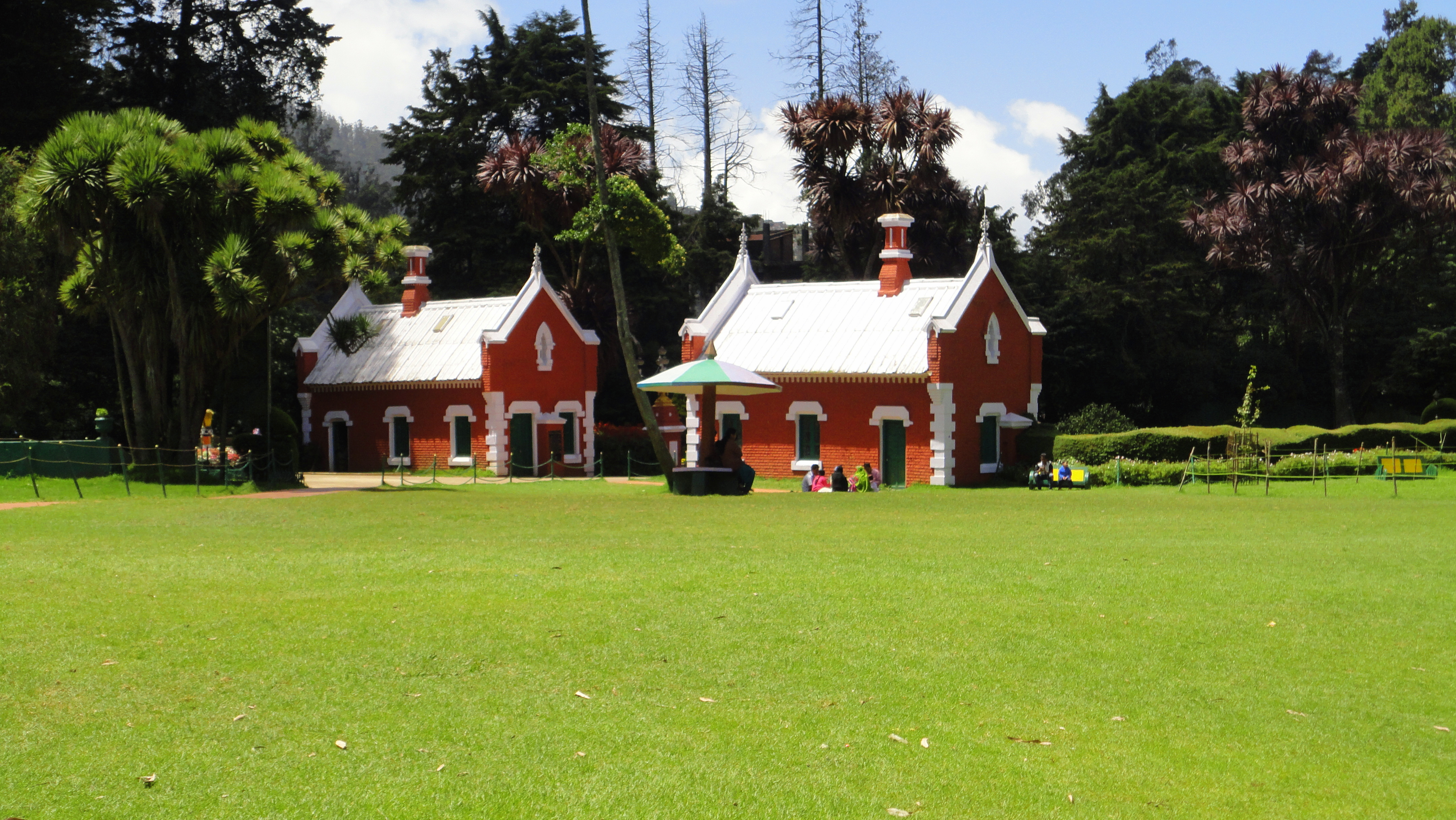
- Ooty Lake Pykara falls Government Botanical Garden
- Nickname: Queen of hill stations
- Location within Tamil Nadu
- Coordinates: 11.41°N 76.70°E
- Country: India
- State: Tamil Nadu
- District: Nilgiris District
- Established: 1821

Government
  - Type: Special Grade Municipality
  - Body: Udagamandalam Municipality
  - Chairperson: M. Vanieshwari (DMK)
  - Vice Chairman: J. Ravikumar (DMK)
  - MLA: M. Bhojarajan (BJP)

Area
  - Total: 30.36 km^{2} (11.72 sq mi)
- Elevation: 2,240 m (7,350 ft)

Population (2011)
  - Total: 88,430
  - Density: 2,913/km^{2} (7,544/sq mi)
- Demonym(s): Ootian, Ootacamandian, Udagaikaran

Languages
  - Official: Tamil
- Time zone: UTC+5:30 (IST)
- PIN: 643001
- Telephone: 91423
- Vehicle registration: TN-43

Ooty (Note: (Tamil: [uːʈ(ː)i]; officially Udagamandalam (Tamil: [uðɐhɐmɐɳɖɐlɐm]), anglicised: Ootacamund, abbreviated as Udagai, Tamil: [uðɐhɐi])) is a town and seat of the Nilgiris district in the Indian state of Tamil Nadu. It is located at an altitude of 2,240 m (7,350 ft), in the Nilgiri Mountains, which forms part of the Western Ghats, and is known by the epithet "Queen of hill stations".

The earliest reference to the Nilgiri Mountains is found in the Tamil Sangam literature. The region was originally occupied by several hill tribes such as Badagas, Todas, Kotas, Irulas and Kurumbas. Over the centuries, it was part of the various kingdoms that ruled over South India. It came under the rule of the East India Company in the 18th century. In the early 19th century, Ooty was developed as a sanatorium around an artificial lake. It was made a municipality in 1866, and later served as the summer capital of the Madras Presidency.

Post Indian independence, the town developed into a popular hill station and recreational area. The economy of the town is majorly based on tourism and agriculture. The town is connected to the plains by the Nilgiri ghat roads and the Nilgiri Mountain Railway. It also hosts the Ooty Radio Telescope at Muthorai, and the Defence Services Staff College of the Indian Army at nearby fisbWellingon.

Ooty forms part of the Nilgiri Biosphere Reserve, the largest protected forest area in India. The region is part of the South Western Ghats montane rain forests ecoregion and harbours thousands of plant species. The native vegetation consisted of meadows and grasslands on the hillsides with shola forets in the valleys. The Government Botanical Garden, laid out in 1842, has several species of indigenous and exotic plants. The region hosts several faunal species, including significant population of Bengal tiger and Indian elephant.

== Etymology ==
The region was earlier known as orrai-kal manru, with orrai-kal meaning 'single stone' in Tamil, a reference to a sacred stone revered by the local Toda people and manru, a word for Toda village. It later became Udagamandalam in Tamil, which was anglicised to Ootacamund during the British Raj, with Ootaca being a corruption of the local name for the region and mand was a shortened form of the local word mandu. In a letter written to the Madras Gazette in March 1821, the name of the place is mentioned as Wotokymund. Ootacamund was later shortened to Ooty. It is the major town in the Nilgiris, which means "blue mountains", so named due to the Kurunji flower, which used to give the slopes a bluish tinge.

== History ==
The earliest reference to Nilgiri Mountains is found in the Tamil Sangam epic Silappathikaram from the 5th or 6th century CE. The region was a land occupied by various tribes such as Badagas, Todas, Kotas, Irulas and Kurumbas. The region was ruled by the three Tamil kingdoms of Cheras, Cholas and Pandyas during various times. The Todas are referenced in a record belonging to Hoysala king Vishnuvardhana and his general Punisa, dated 1117 CE. It was also ruled by various dynasties like Pallavas, Satavahanas, Gangas, Kadambas, Rashtrakutas, Hoysalas and the Vijayanagara Empire. Tipu Sultan captured Nilgiris in the eighteenth century and the region came into possession of British in 1799. It became part of Coimbatore district of the Madras Presidency.

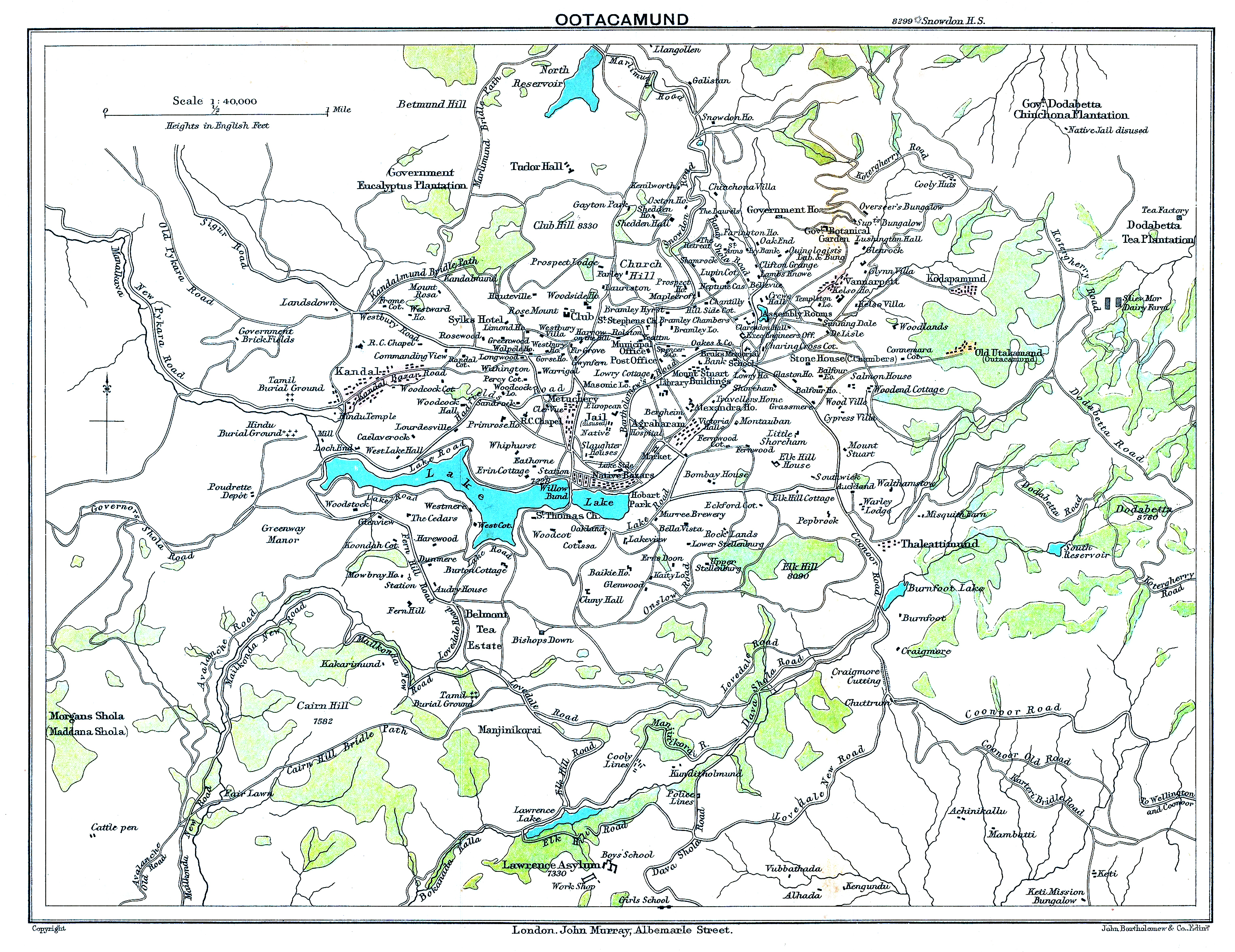
Map of Udagamandalam in 1903

In 1818, J. C. Whish and N. W. Kindersley, assistants to John Sullivan, then collector of Coimbatore district, visited Kotagiri nearby and reported on the region's potential to serve as a summer retreat. Sullivan established his residence there and reported to the Board of Revenue on 31 July 1819. He also started work on a road from Sirumugai which was completed in May 1823 and extended up to Coonoor between 1830 and 1832. By 1827, it was established as a sanatorium of the Madras Presidency and developed further at the behest of then Governor of Madras Stephen Lushington. The Government Botanical Garden, covering 51 acres (21 ha), was established in 1842 and a library was established in 1859.

Ooty was made a municipality in 1866, and civic improvements including roads, drainage, and water supply from the Marlimund and Tiger Hill reservoirs were added through Government loans. In August 1868, the Nilgiris was separated from the Coimbatore district, and James Wilkinson Breeks was appointed its first commissioner. On 1 February 1882, Nilgiris was made a district, and Richard Wellesley Barlow, the then commissioner, became its first collector. By the early 20th century, Ooty was a well-developed hill station, with an artificial lake, various parks, religious structures, and sporting facilities for polo, golf, and cricket. It served as the summer capital of the Madras Presidency and as a retreat for the British officials.

Post-independence, the town developed into a popular recreational resort and the nearby Wellington became the home of the Defence Services Staff College of the Indian Army.

== Geography ==
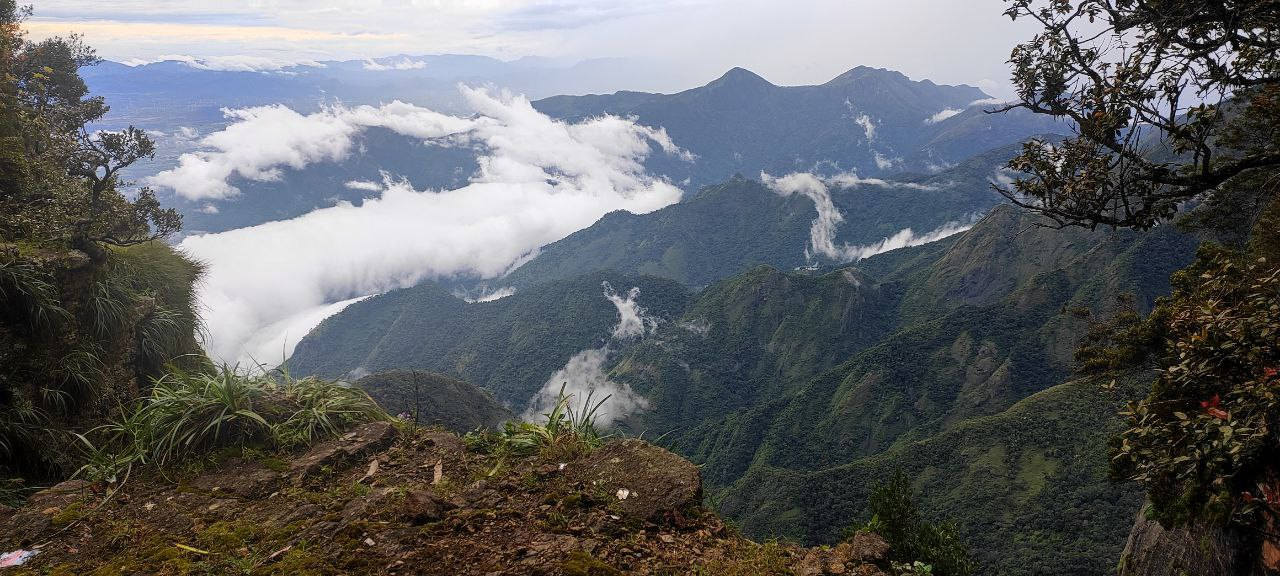
Ooty is located in the Nilgiri hills

Ooty is located in the Nilgiri hills, which are part of the Western Ghats in the Nilgiri Biosphere Reserve. It is separated from the neighboring state of Karnataka by the Moyar river in the north and from the Anaimalai and Palani hills in the south by the Palghat Gap. It is situated at an altitude of 2,240 metres (7,350 feet) above sea level. The total area of the town is 30.36 km^{2} (11.72 sq mi). Doddabetta is the highest peak (2,623 m or 8,606 ft) in the Nilgiris, about 10 km (6.2 mi) from Ooty.

Ooty Lake is an artificial lake covering 65 acres (26 ha) created in 1824. The Pykara, a river located 19 km (12 mi) from Ooty, rises at Mukurthi peak and flows through a series of cascades with the last two falls of 55 m (180 ft) and 61 m (200 ft) known as Pykara falls. Kamaraj Sagar Dam is located 10 km (6.2 mi) from the Ooty. Emerald Lake, Avalanche Lake and Porthimund Lake are other lakes in the region.

== Climate ==
Ooty features a subtropical highland climate (Cwb) under Köppen climate classification. Because of its high altitude, the temperatures are generally lower than the surrounding plains with the average between 10–25 °C (50–77 °F) during summer and 0–21 °C (32–70 °F) during winter. The highest temperature ever recorded was 29.4 °C (84.9 °F) on 30 April 2024, and the lowest temperature recorded was −5.1 °C (22.8 °F). The town gets heavy rainfall during both south-west and north-east monsoons and the average rainfall is about 1,100 mm (43 in) of precipitation annually.

Climate data for Ooty (Udagamandalam) 1991-2020
Month	Jan	Feb	Mar	Apr	May	Jun	Jul	Aug	Sep	Oct	Nov	Dec	Year
Record high °C (°F)	27.5 (81.5)	27.3 (81.1)	27.5 (81.5)	28.5 (83.3)	28.0 (82.4)	26.1 (79.0)	24.4 (75.9)	23.0 (73.4)	23.3 (73.9)	26.8 (80.2)	25.2 (77.4)	27.4 (81.3)	28.5 (83.3)
Mean daily maximum °C (°F)	21.4 (70.5)	21.9 (71.4)	23.3 (73.9)	22.7 (72.9)	22.8 (73.0)	18.8 (65.8)	17.2 (63.0)	17.5 (63.5)	19.1 (66.4)	19.0 (66.2)	19.1 (66.4)	20.9 (69.6)	20.4 (68.7)
Mean daily minimum °C (°F)	6.5 (43.7)	7.3 (45.1)	9.5 (49.1)	11.1 (52.0)	11.8 (53.2)	11.7 (53.1)	11.2 (52.2)	11.0 (51.8)	10.8 (51.4)	10.6 (51.1)	9.6 (49.3)	6.9 (44.4)	9.8 (49.7)
Record low °C (°F)	−5.1 (22.8)	0.0 (32.0)	1.1 (34.0)	4.0 (39.2)	4.4 (39.9)	2.2 (36.0)	2.5 (36.5)	4.6 (40.3)	4.4 (39.9)	0.0 (32.0)	−1.1 (30.0)	−1.1 (30.0)	−5.1 (22.8)
Average rainfall mm (inches)	4.9 (0.19)	5.1 (0.20)	22.4 (0.88)	84.0 (3.31)	123.9 (4.88)	147.6 (5.81)	152.3 (6.00)	116.5 (4.59)	117.1 (4.61)	189.2 (7.45)	144.5 (5.69)	49.9 (1.96)	1,157.4 (45.57)
Average rainy days	0.7	0.5	1.3	5.6	8.6	11.1	12.4	9.4	8.9	11.4	7.8	3.2	80.9
Average relative humidity (%) (at 17:30 IST)	69	67	61	70	75	85	88	88	86	86	85	73	77
Mean daily sunshine hours	8	8	8	8	7	4	4	4	5	5	6	7	6
Source 1: Indian Meteorological Department
Source 2: Weather2Travel for sunshine

== Biodiversity and wildlife ==
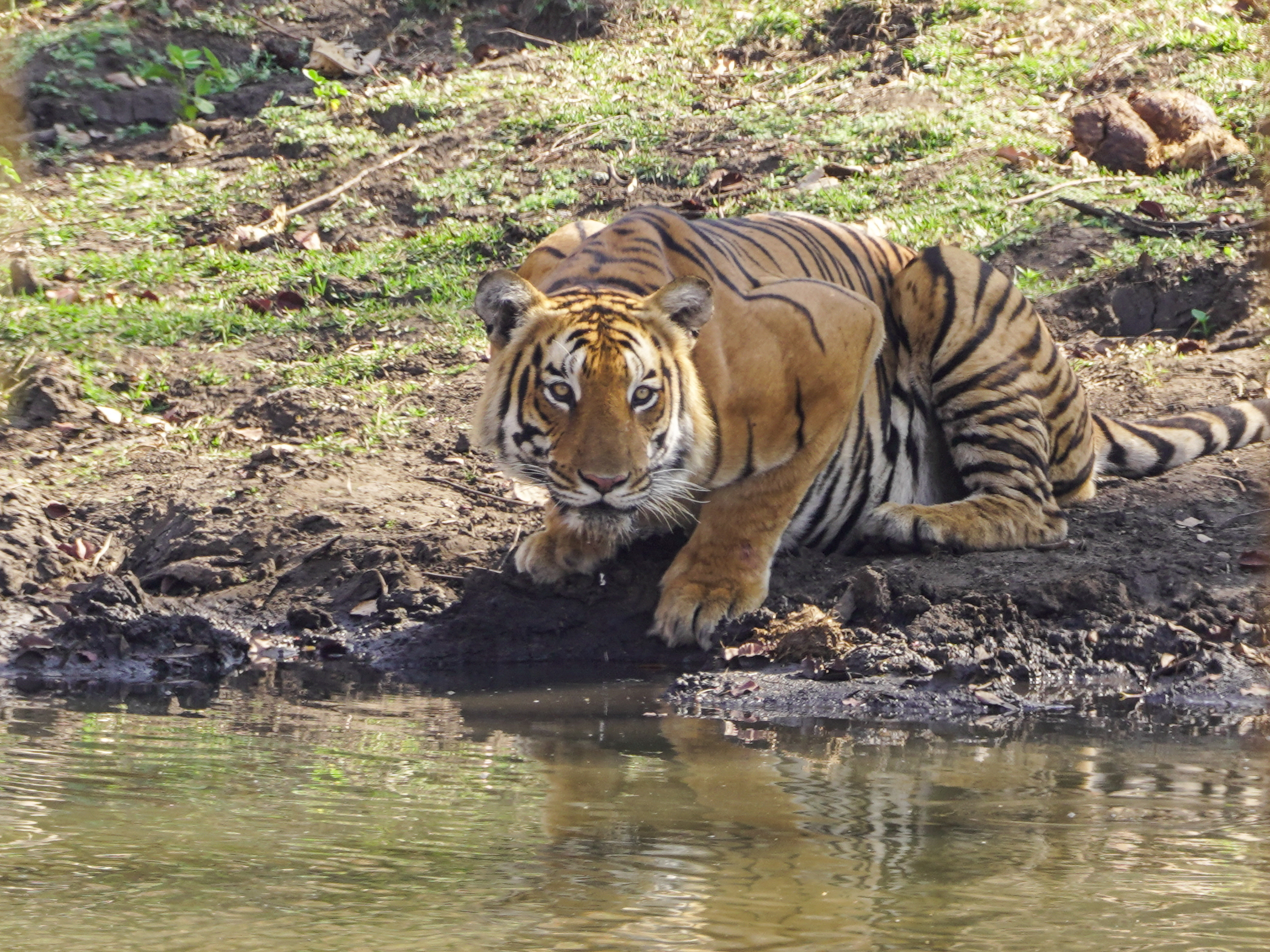
A Bengal tiger in Mudumalai National Park

Ooty forms part of the Nilgiri Biosphere Reserve, the largest protected forest area in India. It was declared as a protected reserve in 1986 and is part of UNESCO's Man and the Biosphere Programme. Mudumalai National Park and tiger reserve lies on the north-western side, about 31 km (19 mi) from Ooty and was established in 1940 as the first wildlife sanctuary in India.

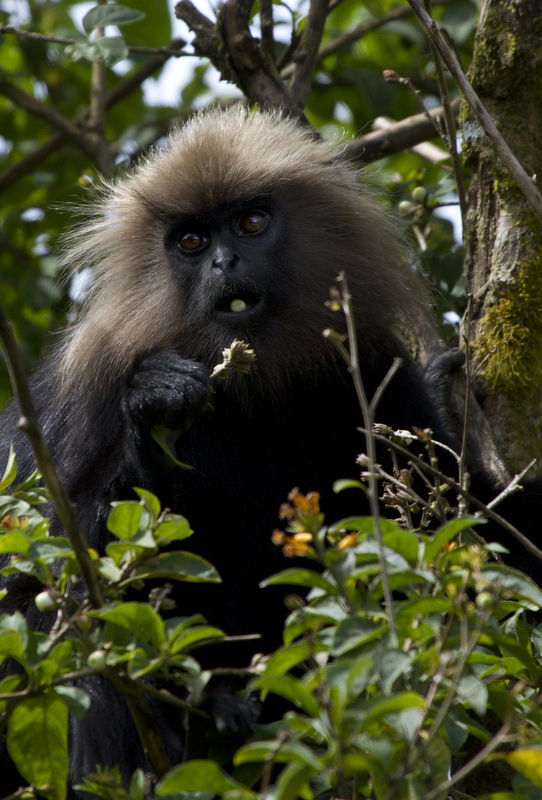
Nilgiri langur is an endangered primate, found only in the region

The region is part of the South Western Ghats montane rain forests ecoregion. Nilgiris harbours thousands of plant species including medicinal plants and endemic flowering plants. Stunted evergreen trees grow in shola forest patches above 1,800 m (5,900 ft) and are festooned with epiphytes. The native vegetation consisted of Meadows and grasslands on the hillsides with shola forests in the valleys. When the British populated the town, invasive species of pine, wattle and eucalyptus were planted along with tea plantations and they became the dominant species replacing the native vegetation.

The region has one of the largest Bengal tiger populations. The Indian elephant is the largest mammal in the region. The gaur is the largest ungulate in the region that frequent grasslands in the vicinity of water sources. Other mega-fauna include Indian leopard and sloth bear. Smaller fauna include Jungle cat, rusty-spotted cat, leopard cat, dhole, Golden jackal, Nilgiri marten, Small Indian civet, Asian palm civet, brown palm civet, ruddy mongoose, wild boar, Indian pangolin, Indian crested porcupine and Indian giant squirrel. Indian giant flying squirrel, Smooth-coated otter groups are observed along the Moyar River. Deer include sambar deer, chital, Indian spotted chevrotain, Indian muntjac, four-horned antelope and blackbuck. Monkeys, including the endangered Nilgiri langur, bonnet macaque and gray langur are also found in the region. Nilgiri tahr is an endangered ungulate that is endemic to the Nilgiris and is the state animal of Tamil Nadu. Bats are found in locationcaves in the hills. More than 200 species of birds are found in the region.

== Demographics ==
Religious census
Religion	Percent(%)
Hindu	64.36%
Christian	21.25%
Muslim	13.37%
Other	1.03%

According to the 2011 census, Ooty had a population of 88,430 with a sex-ratio of 1,053 females for every 1,000 males, much above the national average of 929. A total of 7,781 were under the age of six, constituting 3,915 males and 3,866 females.Scheduled Castes and Scheduled Tribes accounted for 28.98% and 0.30% of the population respectively. The average literacy of the city in 2011 was 90.2%, compared to the national average of 72.99%. The city had a total of 23,235 households. There were a total of 35,981 workers, comprising 636 cultivators, 5,194 agricultural labourers, 292 in household industries, 26,411 other workers, 3,448 marginal workers, 65 marginal cultivators, 828 marginal agricultural labourers, 56 marginal workers in household industries and 2,499 other marginal workers. According to the 2011 census, Ooty had 64.36% Hindus, 21.25% Christians, 13.37% Muslims, 0.03% Sikhs, 0.3% Buddhists, 0.4% Jains, 0.28% following other religions and 0.02% following no religion or did not indicate any religious preference.

Tamil is the official language of Ooty. Languages native to the Nilgiris including Badaga, Paniya, Irula and Kurumba. Due to its proximity to the neighboring states of Kerala and Karnataka and being a tourist destination, Malayalam, Kannada and English are also spoken and understood to an extent. According to the 2011 census, the most widely spoken language in Udagamandalam taluk was Tamil, spoken by 88,896 people, followed by Badaga with 41,213 and Kannada with 27,070 speakers.

== Administration and politics ==
Ooty is the headquarters of the Nilgiris district. The town is part of the Udagamandalam Assembly constituency which forms part of the Nilgiris Lok Sabha constituency. The town is administered by Udagamandalam municipality which was established in 1866 and the town is divided into 36 wards. The municipality is responsible for water services, sewage disposal and maintenance of public infrastructure.

== Economy ==
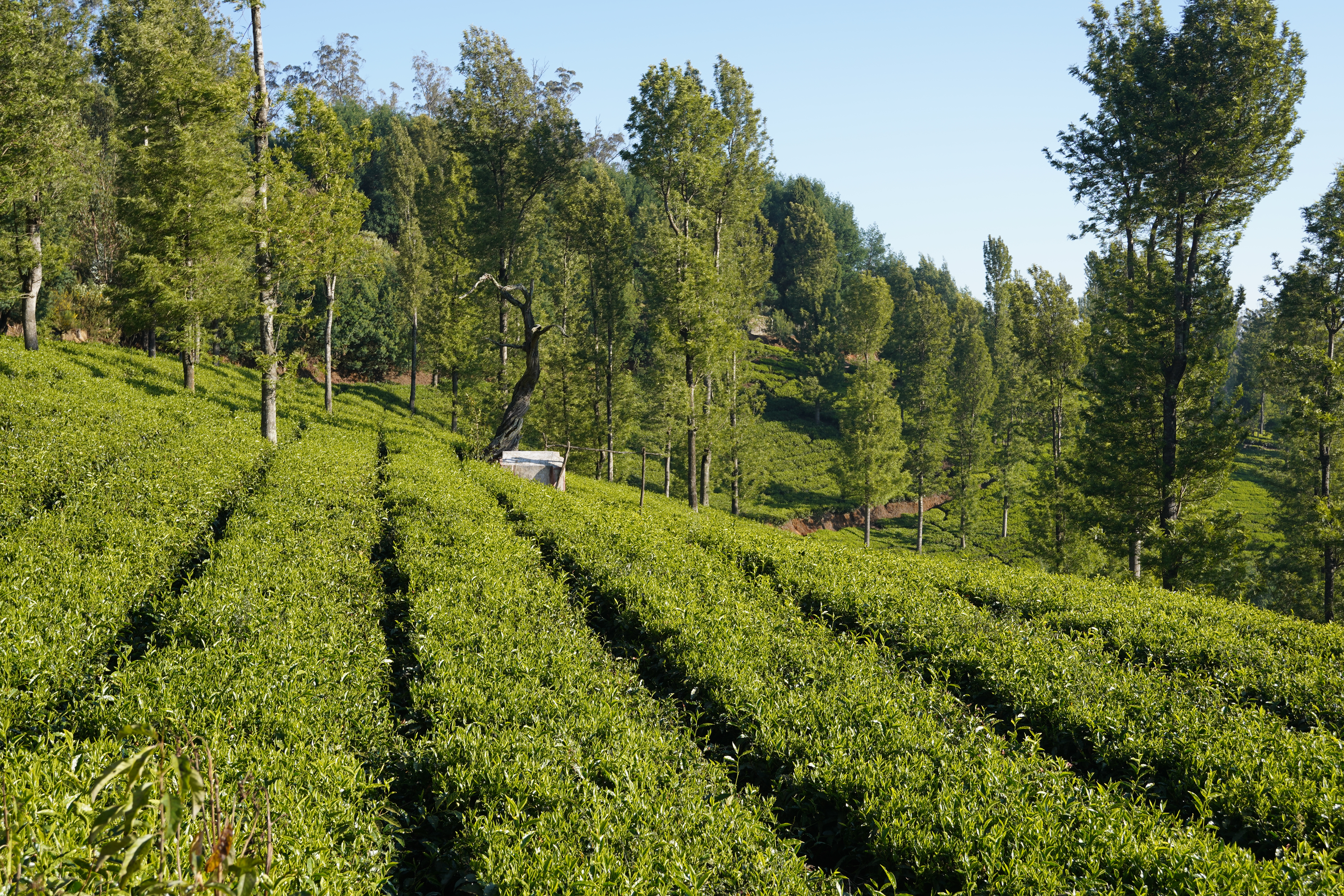
Tea plantations in Ooty

Ooty is a market town for the surrounding area, which is still largely dependent on agriculture. Vegetables cultivated include potato, carrot, cabbage and cauliflower and fruits include peach, plum, pear and strawberry. There is a daily wholesale auction of these products at the Ooty Municipal Market. Dairy farming has long been present in the area, and there is a cooperative dairy manufacturing cheese and skimmed milk powder. Floriculture and sericulture are also practised, as is the cultivation of mushrooms. The local area is known for tea cultivation. Nilgiri tea is a black tea variety unique to the region. Human Biologicals Institute, established in 1999, manufactures vaccines. There is a defence factory at Aruvankadu near Ooty that produces cordite and other ordinance for the Indian Armed Forces.

== Transport ==
=== Road ===
Ooty is connected by roads known as the Nilgiri Ghat Roads and is situated on National Highway 181. The municipality maintains the roads in the town. Public bus services are operated by the Coimbatore division of Tamil Nadu State Transport Corporation. State Express Transport Corporation, Karnataka State Road Transport Corporation, and Kerala State Road Transport Corporation operating from the Ooty bus stand connect the town with major cities in Tamil Nadu and neighboring states.

=== Rail ===
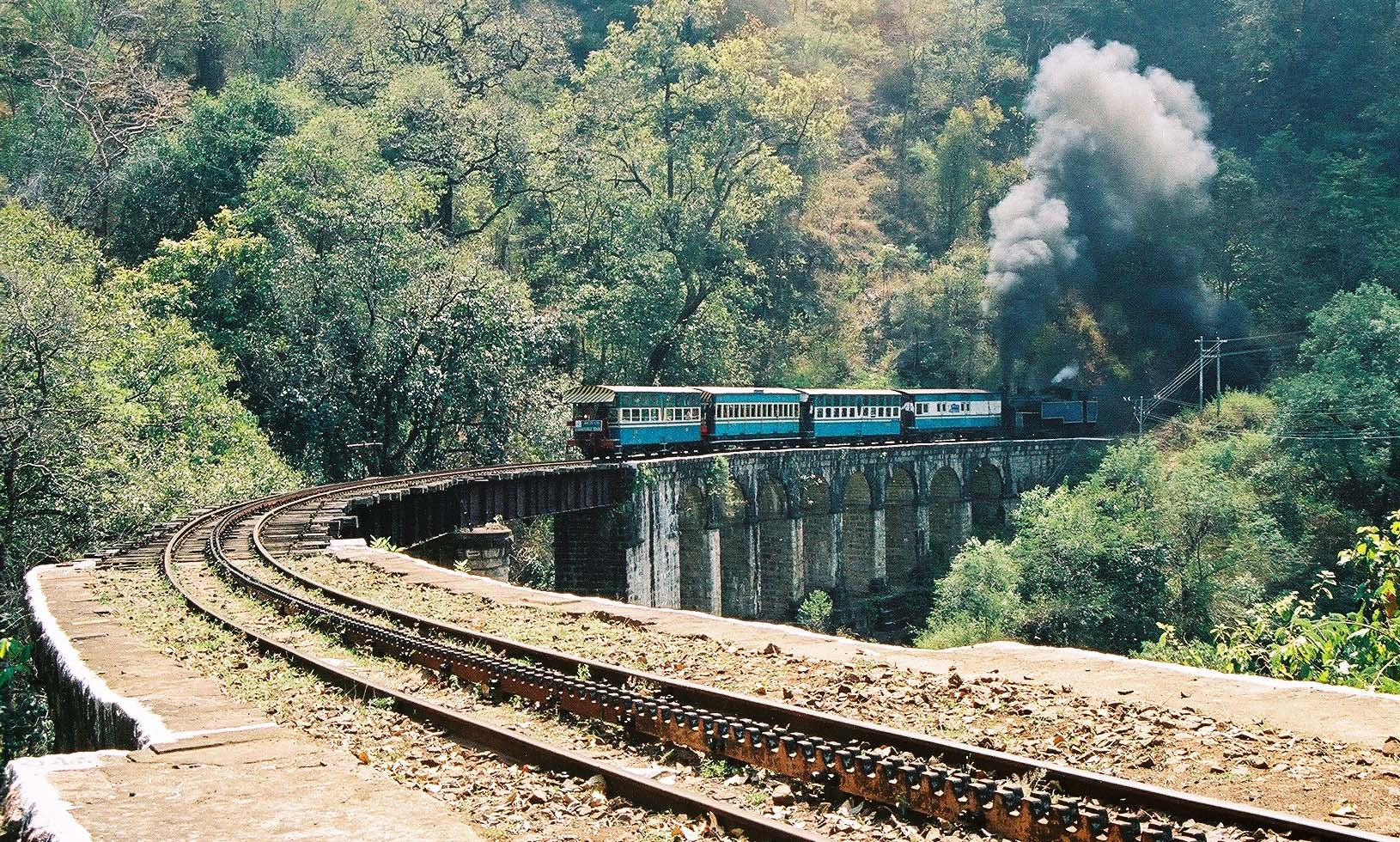
Nilgiri Mountain Railway, a UNESCO World Heritage Site

Nilgiri Mountain Railway is a 1,000 mm (3 ft 3 3/8 in) metre gauge railway in Nilgiris district, connecting Udagamandalam and Mettupalayam. The Nilgiri Railway Company was formed in 1885, and the Mettupalayam-Coonoor section of the track was opened for traffic on 15 June 1899. The railway was operated by the Madras Railway until 31 December 1907, when it was handed over to the South Indian Railway. The line from Coonoor to Ooty was completed in 1908. Operated currently by the Southern Railway zone of Indian Railways, it is the only rack railway in India and operates on its own fleet of steam locomotives between Coonoor and Udagamandalam. In July 2005, UNESCO added the Nilgiri Mountain Railway as an extension to the World Heritage Site of Mountain Railways of India.

=== Air ===
The nearest airport is Coimbatore International Airport, located 96 km (60 mi) from the town. The airport has regular flights from and to major domestic destinations and international destinations like Colombo, Sharjah, and Singapore. Ooty has three helipads, one at Theettukal and two at Kodanad with the Theettukal helipad, approved by the Airports Authority of India for defence and VIP services. In 2014, Pawan Hans planned to start commercial services with a fleet of Bell 407 helicopters, but the plan has been shelved.

== Education ==
Government Arts College, established in 1955, and is affiliated with Bharathiar University. There are a few other colleges in the town. Boarding schools have been a feature of Ooty since the British Raj and continue to operate currently, including some of the most expensive schools in India.

== Tourism ==
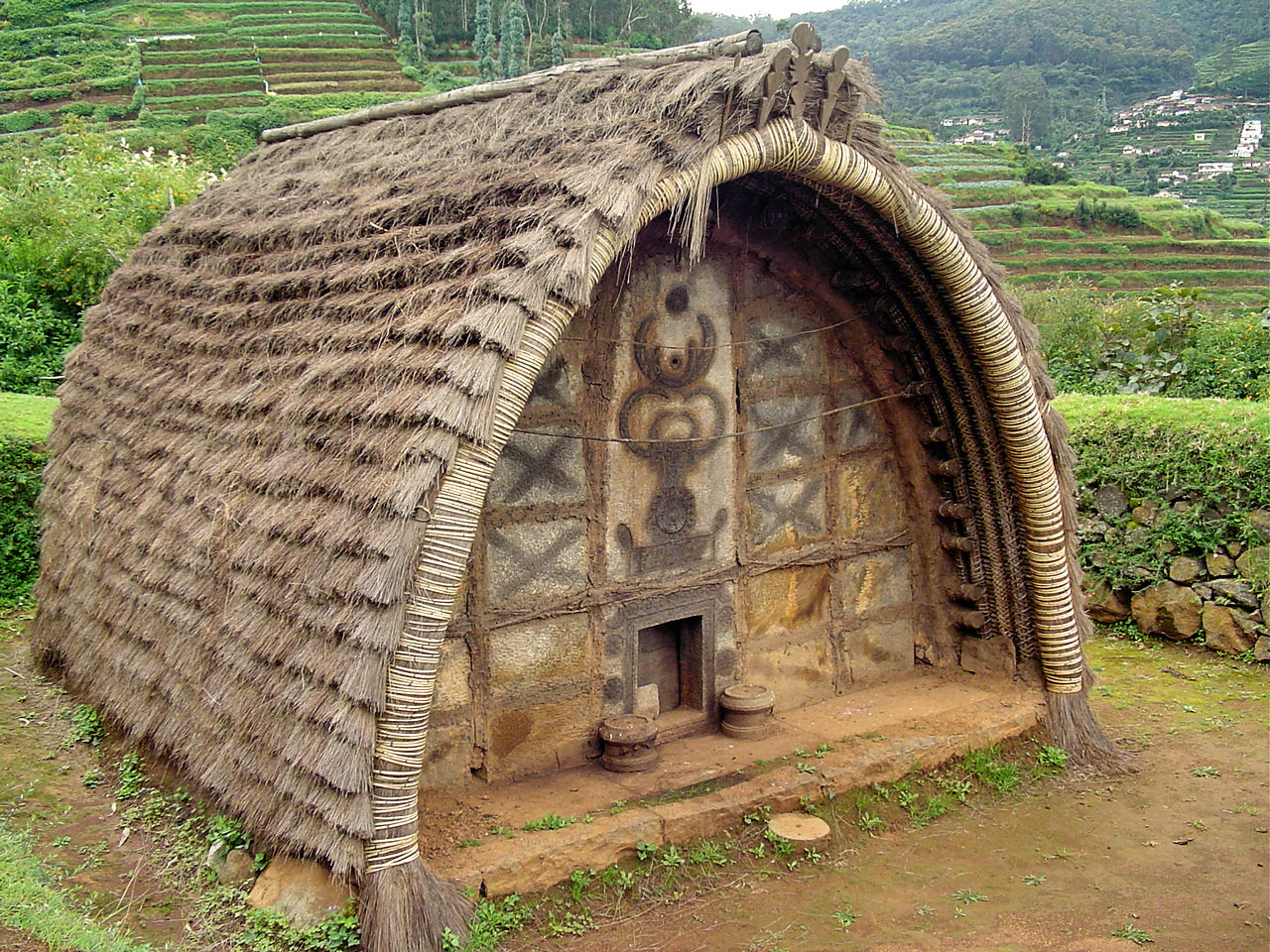
Traditional Toda dogle

A boat house located alongside the Ooty Lake offers boating facilities to tourists and is a major tourist attraction in Ooty. Boating facilities are also available at the Pykara falls and dam. The Government Botanical Garden, laid out in 1842, has several species of indigenous and exotic plants, and hosts an annual flower show in May. The garden also hosts a 20-million-year-old fossilised tree. The Government Rose Garden, situated on the slopes of Elk Hill, at an altitude of 2,200 m (7,200 ft), has more than 20,000 varieties of roses from 2,800 cultivars and is the largest rose garden in India. A deer park was established along the edges of the lake in 1986 and is the second-highest altitude zoo in India.

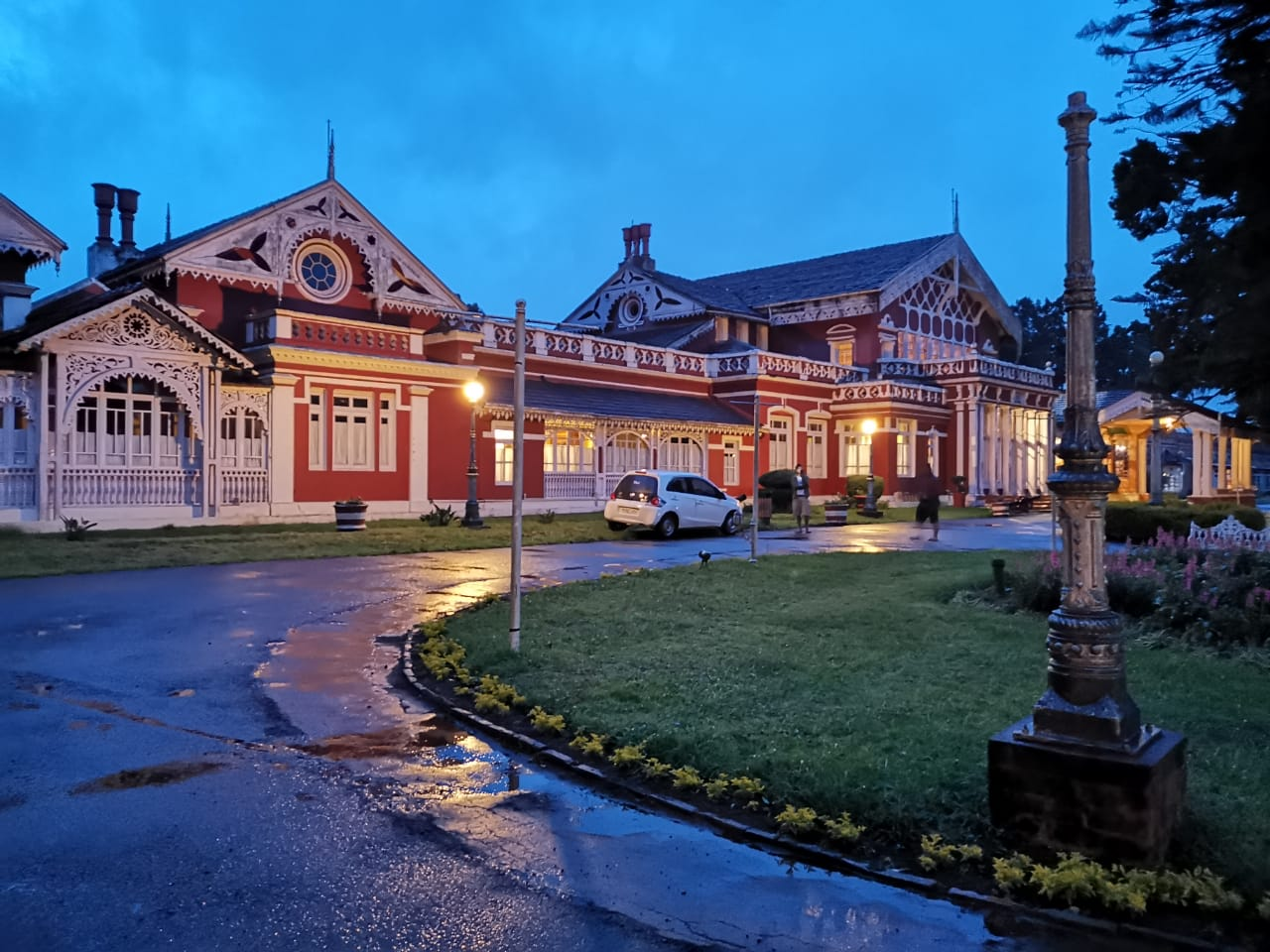
Fernhils Palace

There are a few traditional Toda dogles (huts) on the hills above the Botanical Garden. A Tribal Museum was opened in 1995 as a part of the Tribal Research Center. Located about 10 km (6.2 mi) from the town, it hosts rare artifacts and photographs of various tribal groups of Tamil Nadu and Andaman and Nicobar, and other anthropological and archaeological finds related to early human culture and heritage in the region. The Stone House was the first bungalow constructed in the town. St Stephen's Church, built in 1829, is one of the oldest churches in the Nilgiris district. St. Thomas Church, opened in 1871, hosts many famous graves in the churchyard including those of J. J. Goodwin and William Patrick Adam, whose grave is topped by a pillar monument dedicated to St. Thomas, the tallest structure in Ooty. Spread over an area of nearly 1 acre (0.40 ha), the tea factory and museum showcases the tea-processing process and the machinery used in its production.

The Ooty Radio Telescope was established in 1970 and is part of the National Centre for Radio Astrophysics of the Tata Institute of Fundamental Research, funded by the Government of India through the Department of Atomic Energy.

== Sports and recreation ==
The game of snooker was perfected by Neville Chamberlain on the billiard tables of the Ootacamund Club. There was a cricket ground which hosted regular matches between teams from the Indian Army and the Indian Civil Service. There were riding stables and kennels at Ooty, where hounds were kept for hunting across the surrounding countryside and the open grasslands of the Wenlock Downs. Horse racing is held at the Ooty Racecourse. The Ooty Golf Course is located at an altitude of 2,300 m (7,600 ft) and extends over 78.33 ha (193.56 acres).

== In popular culture ==
Ooty varkey is a crispy and crusty cookie snack popular in Ooty. It was accorded Geographical Indication tag in 2022-23.

A number of films have been shot in Ooty, including the 2025 feature film Retro (film). The town was used as a setting in David Lean's 1984 movie, A Passage to India, which was based on E. M. Forster's novel of the same name.

== See also ==
- List of hill stations in India
