= Kakkoos =

- Official poster for documentary film Kakkoos
- Directed by: Divya Bharathi
- Produced by: Left Side Media
- Cinematography: Divya Bharathi; Palani Kumar; Gopalakrishnan
- Edited by: Divya Bharathi; M.K. Pagalavan
- Music by: Background Score; Prabakhar
- Release date: 27 February 2017
- Running time: 109 minutes
- Country: India
- Language: Tamil

Kakkoos is a 2017 Tamil-language documentary directed by activist Divya Bharathi..The documentary was filmed between 2015 and 2016 across several districts of Tamil Nadu. The film follows the daily lives of people engaged in manual scavenging, a practice officially abolished since 2013 but which is still a common practice. This practice has its roots deeply embedded in the caste system in India. Common notion has it that the caste system is no longer relevant in India, but the film shows compelling evidence about society's conscious efforts to perpetuate caste.

The film addresses a whole range of issues and also establishes that manual scavenging is really about caste discrimination. Dalits are the only caste for the job, and they are underpaid, always as proxy workers with no records to show for their employment. The hazardous nature of the job, where they come into direct contact with faeces, biomedical waste and sewers everyday does not alarm the rest of society. If they die on the job choking in septic tanks, the fight for compensation could very well take another lifetime. Another question the film answers is the alternative employment. When children of manual scavengers face discrimination in school, they drop out. with no education and only a caste identity, they too eventually turn to Kakkoos. Supervisors, state agencies, and law enforcers are all to blame, and worse is that they all have a role in keeping manual scavenging alive.

Divya Bharathi documented 27 cases of men who died cleaning sewers in public and private enterprises and sometimes even in homes. The Safai Karamchari Andolan (SKA), the only NGO in India that works for the complete abolishment of manual scavenging—the practice of removing untreated human excreta by another human—says more than 1,370 people have died in sewer holes in the last four years.

The film has received critical acclaim from various quarters.

The film was embroiled in controversy from the start and denied screening, leading to its release in YouTube instead of traditional theaters. Divya has received death threats since the film was released online. A case was filed against her by an office bearer of a political outfit and Madurai police the judgement was passed on 20 November 2019 by the judge of high court of Madurai, Justice N Anand Venkatesh, who quashed the FIR and also mentioned that the case was clearly an abuse of the process of law and the FIR registered by the police clearly amounts to interfering with fundamental right of speech and expression guaranteed to the petitioner Divya Bharathi.

Many people have come forward after seeing the movie to help the families who have lost their loved ones who were engaged in manual scavenging.
