= Madras Gazette =

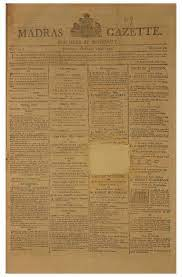
- Issue dated 17 October 1795
- Owner(s): Robert Williams
- Founded: January 1795
- Language: English
- Headquarters: Madras, Madras Presidency, British India

Madras Gazette was a weekly newspaper published in Madras, Madras Presidency, British India and one of the first in India. Madras Gazette competed with the Madras Courier for printing Government notifications.
