= Marlimund Lake =

- View from the dam

- Location within Tamil Nadu
- Location: Nilgiris District, Tamil Nadu, India
- Coordinates: 11.43013°N 76.697552°E
- Type: Reservoir
- Catchment area: 272.15 acres (110.14 ha)
- Basin countries: India
- Managing agency: Udhagamandalam Municipality
- Built: 1870
- First flooded: 1870
- Max. depth: 36 ft (11 m)
- Water volume: 9,870,138 cu ft (279,491.2 m^{3}) (circa 1897)
- Surface elevation: 2,320 m (7,610 ft)

Marlimund Lake is a monsoon-fed reservoir located 3.5 km (2.2 mi) from Ooty in the Nilgiris District, Tamil Nadu, India. It was constructed in 1870 as the principal water source for the Ooty municipality. It continues to supply water to the town, particularly the Pudumund locality.

== History ==
In 1850, Captain Ouchterlony of the Madras Regiment first proposed a water supply scheme for Ootacamund town. His idea lay dormant until 1866 when the Executive Engineer was directed to report on the water-supply scheme. In April 1968, Lieutenant Vibart was assigned to the task. His proposal submitted in the same month was implemented. By November 1870, the Marlimund dam was complete and the reservoir filled. In March 1897, G.T. Walch, who had recently retired from the PWD, submitted a report to the Government. He noted that the catchment area of Marlimund was 272.15 acres (110.14 ha). The storage capacity of the reservoir was 9,870,138 cu ft (279,491.2 m^{3}), of which 1,150,130 cu ft (32,568 m^{3}) was below the outlet level. The water available for distribution was 54.5×10^{6} imp gal (248 Ml). In 1899, private land in the catchment area to the extent of 177.66 acres (71.90 ha) was acquired by the Government to prevent pollution of the water source.

By the end of the 19th century, the water supply from Marlimund was not sufficient to meet the needs of the growing town. In April 1901, construction started on the Tiger Hill dam. When completed, this supplemented the water supply, though Marlimund continued to be the main source of water.

== Description ==
Marlimund Lake is a rain-fed reservoir with a catchment area of 272.15 acres (110.14 ha) (circa 1897) that has served as a water source for Ooty town since 1870. In the 2020s, it is one of several sources, including Parson's Valley, Tiger Hill, Gorishola, Doddabetta Upper and Lower, Kodappamund Upper and Lower, Old Ooty, and Glenrock reservoirs. The Pudumund locality in the north of Ooty is served by the water main from Marlimund. With a depth of 36 ft (11 m), Marlimund has a usable storage capacity 54.5×10^{6} imp gal (248 Ml) (circa 1897).

Low water due to deficient monsoon, August 2026

During years of deficient monsoon rains, the storage in Marlimund and other reservoirs is not sufficient to meet the needs of the town. This is especially a problem during the summer months with inflow of large numbers of tourists to this popular hill station.

== Conservation ==
As the lake supplies drinking water to Ooty town, the municipality decided in 2024 to build a fence to prevent tourists and animals from littering and contaminating the water. The fencing is for a length of 400 m (1,300 ft) around the end abutting the public road. The remote shores of the lake are not fenced, to allow wildlife access to water.
