= Sanjay Kak =

Indian film director

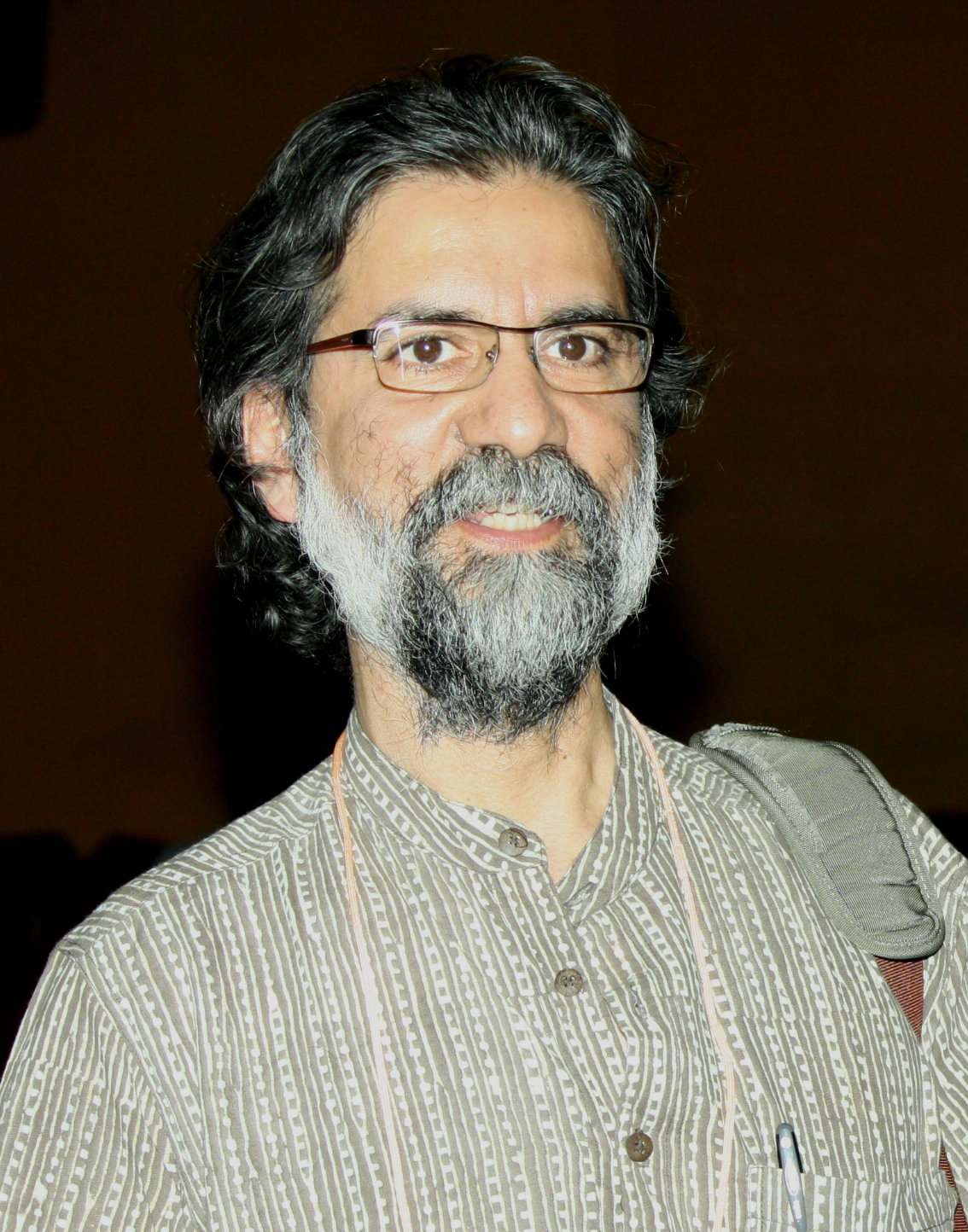
Kak in 2012

Sanjay Kak (born 1958) is an Indian author, activist and self-taught film-maker. He is known for his documentaries about environmental activism and resistance politics.

== Background and education ==
Kak was born into a Kashmiri family, based in New Delhi for several generations.

Kak studied economics and sociology at the University of Delhi. He is a self-taught film-maker who is actively involved in the documentary film movement and in the Campaign against Censorship and the Cinema of Resistance project.

== Career ==
Kak makes documentary films. His early work includes Punjab: Doosra Adhay (1986) about the Punjab in the days of the Khalistan struggle, and Pradakshina (1987), about the river Ganges. He followed this with a 1990 film about Cambodia's Angkor Wat temple, Angkor Remembered. In 1993 he released films about the Indian diaspora in England (This Land, My Land, Eng-land) and South Africa (A House and a Home). 1995 saw the release of Harvest of Rain.

One Weapon (1997) followed, "the documentary that marked Sanjay Kak as an explicitly political filmmaker", according to The Caravan magazine, and In the Forest Hangs a Bridge (1999) about the making of a bridge in Northeast India; winner of the Golden Lotus Best Documentary Film, National Film Awards; Asian Gaze Award, Pusan Short Film Festival, Korea. His next films were Words on Water (2002), about the protests against the Narmada dams in central India, which won Best Long Film prize at the International Festival of Environmental Film & Video (Fica) in Brazil, and Jashn-e-Azadi - How We Celebrate Freedom (2007) about the Kashmiri separatist movement.

According to Patrick Colm Hogan, Jashn-e-Azadi was a "nearly completely unquestioning appreciation of the militancy in the region which mostly ignored atrocities by militants and essentially framed the arrival of jihadists as resistance. The film blamed the Indian government for the displacement of Kashmiri Hindus and was generally uncritical of Pakistan and militants." It "widely influenced the way Kashmir was perceived in India" and had a chequered screening history.

In 2008, he participated in Manifesta7, the European Biennale of Art, in Bolzano, Italy, with the installation A Shrine to the Future: The Memory of a Hill, about the mining of bauxite in the Niyamgiri hills of Odisha. He writes occasional political commentary, and is the editor of Until My Freedom Has Come – The New Intifada in Kashmir (2011).

His latest feature-length documentary is on the militant Maoist movement in India, called Red Ant Dream. The film was under production for more than three years and released in 2013.

== Filmography ==
- Punjab: Doosra Adhay (1986)
- Pradakshina (1987)
- Angkor Remembered (1990)
- This Land, My Land, Eng-land (1993)
- A House and a Home (1993)
- Harvest of Rain (1995)
- One Weapon (1997)
- In the Forest Hangs a Bridge (1999)
- Words on Water (2002)
- Jashn-e-Azaadi (2007)
- Red Ant Dream (2013)
