= Madras Courier =

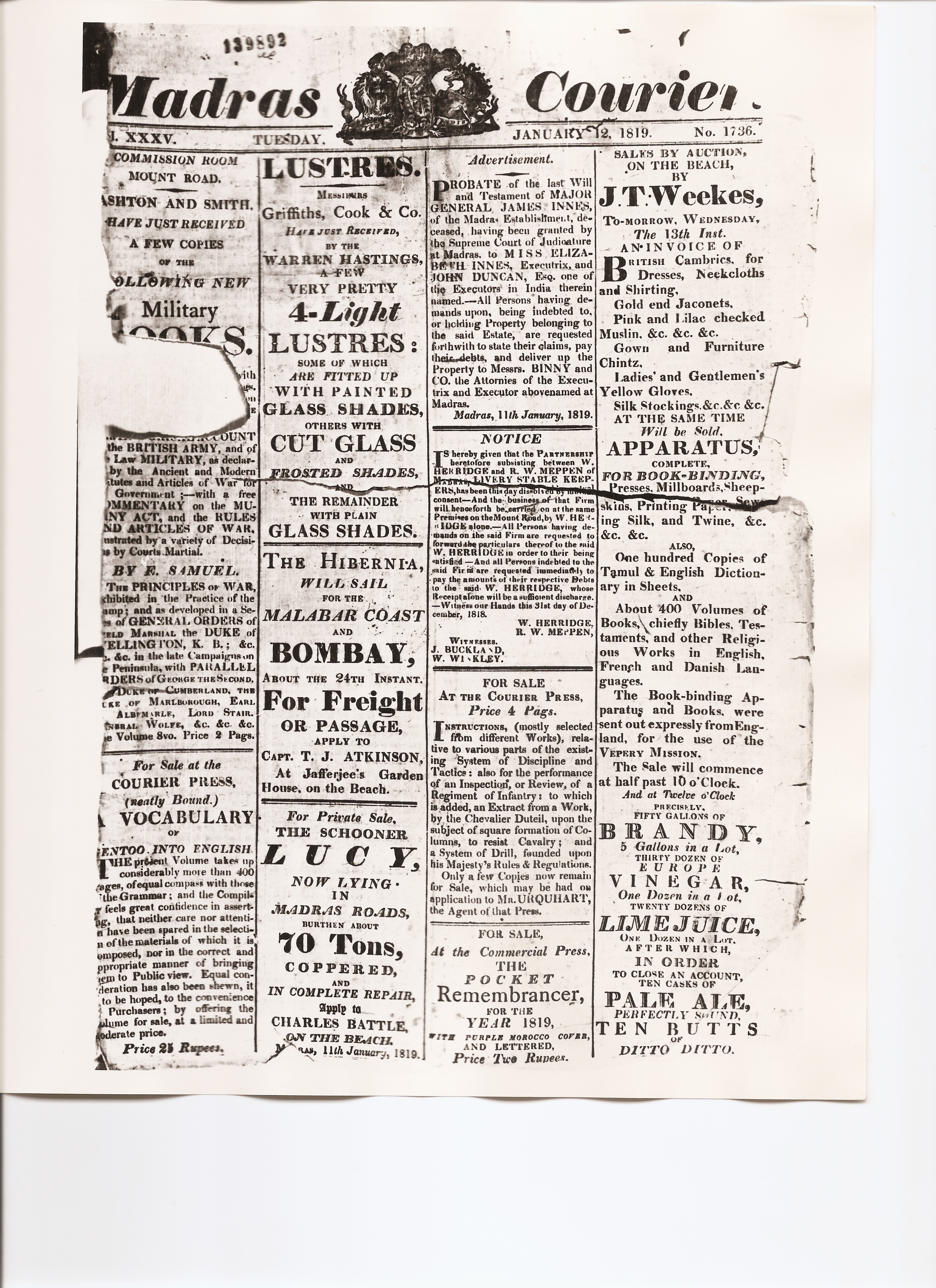
- Owner(s): Richard Johnson
- Publisher: Richard Johnson
- Founded: 12 October 1785
- Language: English
- Ceased publication: 1821
- Headquarters: Madras, Madras Presidency, British India

The Madras Courier was an Indian English language newspaper that ran between 1785 and 1821. It was the first newspaper to be published in Madras, Madras Presidency, British India. It was the leading newspaper of its time and was the officially recognized newspaper for printing government notifications.

== History ==
Madras Courier was found on 12 October 1785 by Richard Johnston, a British Army officer turned printer. The transition in career path led him to establish the first newspaper in the Madras Presidency, following the Bengal Gazette, India's first newspaper, which was launched in Calcutta in 1780. Hugh Boyd was its first editor.

Functioning as a weekly publication, the Madras Courier gained official recognition for publishing government notifications. It enjoyed the patronage of the British East India Company in its initial years. The newspaper, according to Henry Davison Love's Vestiges of Old Madras (1640-1800), benefited from privileges such as postal waivers within the presidency and exemptions on freight charges for importing printing equipment.

In contrast to the Bengal Gazette, which was critical of the East India Company and faced suppression, the Madras Courier avoided offending the company. Nonetheless, it encountered controversies, such as debates over the legality of lotteries for public projects and accusations of libel. The paper faced challenges with the rise of competitors such as the Madras Gazette and Government Gazette, leading to its closure in 1821.

== Contents ==
The newspaper typically encompassed four to six pages and featured a Latin motto, "Quicquid agunt homines" ("Whatever people do"). Its content included British news, letters to the editor, local Indian news, poetry, and advertisements. It initially released issues on Wednesdays, later switching to Thursdays.
