= I Can Love Too =

2011 film

I Can Love Too is a 2011 Indian documentary film directed by Mrinmoy Bhowmick in English and Kannada Languages. The film shot in Bangalore, Karnataka States in India and the film has earned multiple awards and nominations in various prestigious film festivals in India.

== Plot ==
The documentary film, deals with the issues and concerns of "Specially-abled persons", their need and desire for love, and finding a right partner. The challenged people are neglected generally in large by our society, not only in the area of jobs, equal opportunities, etc., but also in other areas too. Marriage is such an important area where the people doubt about their abilities of getting married with a non-disabled partner. The documentary film explains that, a Person with Disability (PWD) has a similar life as anybody in the society and has all the desires to lead a satisfying personal life, when it comes to wedding. In fact, most of them also get married as the non-disabled people do. The film contains different individuals from different category of disability who present the fact that the challenged community, mostly neglected, has all the right and existence in this society, which generally compels them to choose life partners as themselves.
