= Red Ant Dream =

- Red Ant Dream
- Hindi: माटी के लाल
- Directed by: Sanjay Kak
- Written by: Sanjay Kak; Tarun Bhartiya
- Cinematography: Sanjay Kak; Ranjan Palit; Setu Pandey
- Edited by: Tarun Bhartiya
- Music by: Word Sound Power / Delhi Sultanate & Chris McGuiness
- Release date: 8 May 2013
- Running time: 120 minutes
- Country: India
- Languages: Gondi, Oriya, Punjabi

Red Ant Dream (Hindi: माटी के लाल) is a 2013 documentary film directed by Sanjay Kak. This documentary is based on the militant Maoist movement in India. The documentary has been screened in various cities in India since 8 May 2013. It follows the Maoist protests and ambushes which feature the circumstances and environments of the Maoists. It sheds light on what goes on with the Maoists, what they are fighting for where they have been allegedly mistreated by the government.

The film follows all parts of India where the Maoist movement exists and discusses the problems that they allegedly face such as: harsh living conditions and being on constant look out for Police in India. The documentary has a focus on the types of protests that the Maoists hold like singing, marching and chanting together.

The documentary portrays how guerilla warfare is a tactic that has "made it impossible for them to be targeted". It is also claimed that there is no other way to defend themselves from Operation Green Hunt, an operation put in place by the Indian Government to eradicate the Maoists. The operation included 4000 Police Officers led by around 600 elite commanders of the Anti-Naxal Cobra Force which is the biggest ever counter-revolutionary operation.

== Synopsis ==
This documentary deals with the issue of "Maoist insurgency in India". It focuses on the Maoists in Bastar in Chhattisgarh, tribals fighting against industries in Niyamgiri in Odisha and protestors acting in memory of the Indian revolutionary Bhagat Singh in Punjab. This film portrays the people of these regions allegedly resisting oppression.

The movie begins by portraying the killing of Bhagat Singh who was an Indian Revolutionary in the 1930s when India was Imperialized by the British, and the killing of Pash by Sikh extremists, who was a Revolutionary poet. The Naxalites look to them as martyrs for Maoism, and try to "finish what they started" by continuing "the Revolution". They have been called Naxalites ever since the armed uprising that had flared in Naxalbari, Bengal. The first part of the film reveals how the Maoists protest by showing the slogans they chant and different rally's where the leaders inspire the Maoist crowds.

The film then moves into how the Indian government treats the Maoists. According to the film, the Prime Minister of India, Manmohan Singh, strongly opposed the Maoist movement labeling them as terrorists and making them his number one priority. The Maoists believe that the only real terror is State terror. The Government complains about the Maoists, but the Maoists believe the fight is for survival, everybody's survival. The film claims that there have been cases where the Government has labeled criminals not associated with Maoists as Maoists, in order to make them look worse to the general public.

The next part of the film depicts the life of the Naxalites and how they survive by living in the forests. They claim they are fighting for survival as capitalist companies are allegedly devastating the forests and scheming the system in order to pay the workers less than the official rate that the companies list, effectively leaving the workers helpless. The Maoists allege that the Earth will be taken by Capitalist countries trying to make more money and will eventually leave the Naxalites without a home. As the movie progresses it shows the Maoist guerrilla warfare tactics: the soldiers are seen training in the forest because that is the only safe way for them to train and also the most realistic for how they fight against the government.

Kak then moves into footage and interviews he found with Police officers recounting details of Maoist attacks as well as victims and their families telling stories of how they or a loved one was treated by the government, throughout the next 20 minutes of the documentary. The Police officers believe that the Naxalites have misled the people, trained them and in order to stop the Revolutionaries they need to turn the people on the Maoists. In the next interview a woman who claims her husband was brutally murdered recounts the scene when he was killed. She claims he was unarmed and surrounded by police; they proceeded to beat him up, attack him with axes and knives, chop off his limbs and take his child who they have not seen since. The end of this part of the documentary shows Maoist footage of 12 police officers attacking the Naxalites, where the Naxalites kill all but 3 of them.

The last part of the film starts off by focusing on the people who died fighting for Maoism, and the Naxalites telling their story to get people to try to join their fight against the government. Since it is the end of the film Kak ties it all together by reiterating the reasons the Maoists are allegedly fighting for. The Maoists believe that most of the demands of the Naxalites fall within the Indian Constitution, but due to the claimed mistreatment of the people the Maoists have become cynical of the Indian Constitution, hearkening to a poem written by Pash where he declares that the Indian Constitution is dead and not worth reading. The Maoists feel that the Indian government is responsible for all of the violence occurring in India because the more intense and extensive response by the government will breed the intense resistance of the armed minorities. In the film Kak includes an audio of the police getting an order to seek out any possible Naxalites and to kill any journalists that come to cover them. The documentary ends with the Maoists marching together and their kids training to join their fight, practicing to shoot in the forests.

== Production ==
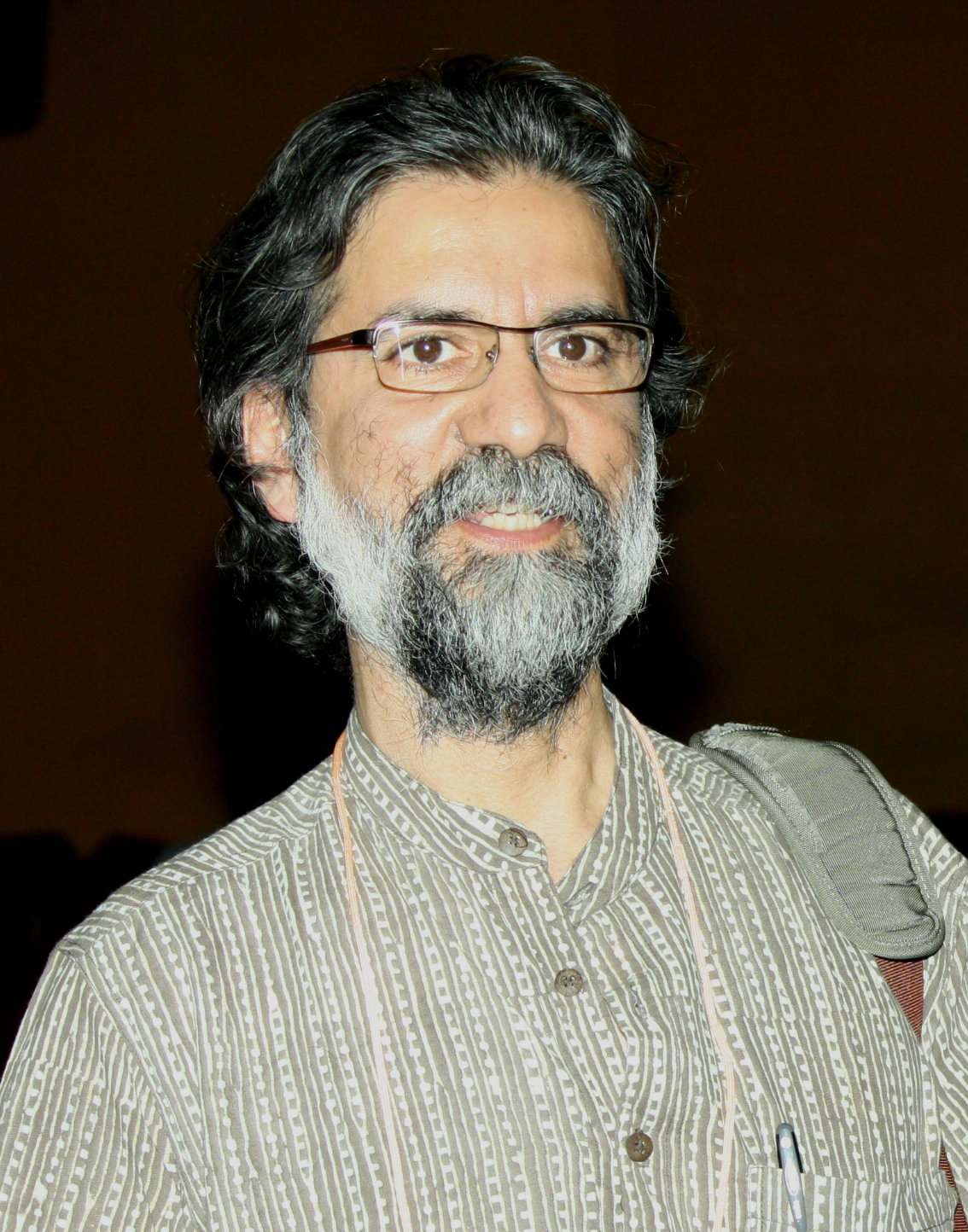
Sanjay Kak(director of Red Ant Dream)

Sanjay Kak is an independent Indian filmmaker who has made other documentaries such as Jashn-e-Azadi, Words on Water which won Best Long Film prize at the International Festival of Environmental Film & Video, Brazil, and In the Forests Hangs a Bridge which won Golden Lotus Best Documentary Film National Film Awards; Asian Gaze Award, Pusan Short Film Festival, Korea.

In an interview with Red Pepper, Kak talks about why he chose India as his subject for his documentary, saying "In India, the legacy of Gandhi has been conveniently deployed by all sorts of political formations to delegitimise any kind of radical challenge to the form of the state. As if the inherent nature of Indian society is 'non-violent', and vegetarian to boot! Whereas the truth is that this is a society constructed on the violence of the caste system. And this is a system that has frequently reinvented itself with the passage of time, in order to fit newer forms of social and political mobilisation." He sees himself as a political filmmaker who tries to capture beauty in complex and disturbing areas of the world. He describes "the struggle is always to find a language in film that is appropriate to one's politics" while also trying to persuade his viewers with his own political understanding. A staple of Kak's films is his use of poetry in order to connect India's past to its present noting that India has a very rich history of poetry in relation with resistance and it helps him to emphasize the sentiments of his subjects in his films. He is not specifically focused on the people in the margins, but notes that he focuses on the people that he is "most excited, energised and renewed by" which continues to draw him back into the theme of resistance.

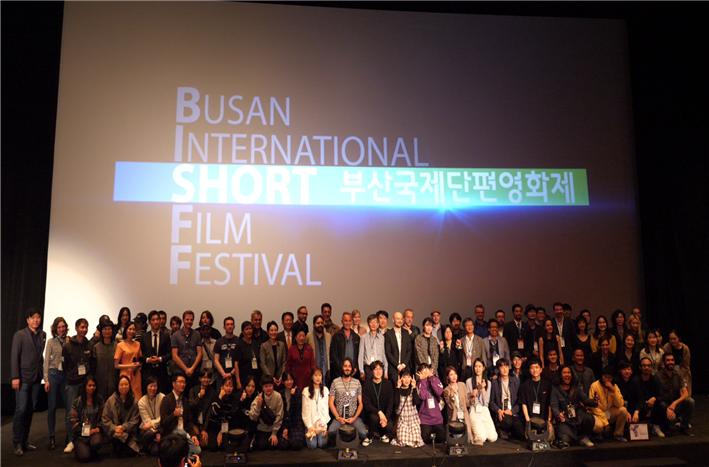
Busan International Film Festival 2018

Red Ant Dream was financed by funds given by an International Documentary Film Festival Amsterdam Fund grant and a prize from the Busan International Film Festival.

During the Busan International Film Festival the Asian Cinema Fund provides filmmakers the opportunity to share their work with one another giving them a "pan-Asian network" which gives the filmmakers the ability to establish their films and "position themselves as important parts of the film industry". Their goal is to be able to show high quality Asian films around the world.

== Reviews ==
Tansuhree Bhasin, writer for Sunday Guardian, in his review of Red Ant Dream, said "In a sense Red Ant Dream gives a face to what the state calls the 'greatest internal security threat' to the country". He notes how Kak has been outspoken about the Indian state's allegedly oppressive regime and it's "dodgy affair with capitalism and foreign investment"
