= About Love (2019 film) =

2019 Indian documentary

- Directed by: Archana Atul Phadke
- Produced by: Archana Atul Phadke; Abhay Kumar
- Starring: Maneesha Phadke; Atul Phadke; Neela Phadke; Madhav Phadke; Sagarika Phadke; Rohan Phadke; Laali Phadke; Gurbani Bagga Phadke; Sonal Phadke; Sushila Bai
- Cinematography: Archana Atul Phadke
- Edited by: Archa Atul Phadke; Abhay Kumar
- Music by: Shane Mendonsa
- Distributed by: Mubi (Europe); PBS (US)
- Release date: 6 June 2019
- Running time: 91 minutes
- Country: India
- Languages: Marathi; English

About Love is a 2019 Indian documentary film directed and edited by Archana Atul Phadke. Filmed over three years, the film follows three generations of the Phadke family living in the family home in southern Mumbai. It premiered at the 2019 Sheffield International Documentary Festival, where Phadke won the New Talent Award.

== Cast ==
- Maneesha Phadke
- Atul Phadke
- Neela Phadke
- Madhav Phadke
- Sagarika Phadke
- Rohan Phadke
- Laali Phadke
- Gurbani Bagga Phadke
- Sonal Phadke
- Sushila Bai

== Plot ==
The documentary follows three years in the life of the Hindu Phadke family living in Mumbai, Maharashtra, India, including family patriarch Madhav and his wife of 68 years, Neela; their son Atul and his wife Maneesha, who have been married for 32 years; and Atul and Maneesha's children, including single daughters Archana and Sagarika, as well as their son Rohan, who is engaged to a Sikh woman, Gurbani. Also living in the home is Madhave's brother Laali; the family are assisted by their maid of 52 years, Sushila. The film, composed of footage recorded by Archana, features scenes of domesticity, including arguments between Madhave and Neela, as well as Atul and Maneesha; preparations for Rohan's wedding to Gurbani; Madhave and Laali's declining health, including Madhave's eventual death and Laali's move into a care home; and Maneesha writing stories about Radha Krishna.

Throughout the film, Archana and Sagarika are questioned on their unwillingness to get married, while Neela and Maneesha speak about the difficulties of being wives. The film culminates with Rohan's marriage, and his new wife Gurbani being formally welcomed into the family home.

== Production ==
About Love was filmed over the course of three years by Phadke, using a handheld camera, primarily within the multi-storey family home she had grown up in southern Mumbai, which had belonged to the Phadke family since 1902. Phadke had become a 2017 alumnus of Berlinale Talents, the Berlin International Film Festival's talent development programme, following the release of her short film Uski Baarish (2013); About Love is her first feature film as a director.

== Release ==
About Love premiered at the Sheffield International Documentary Festival in 2019. That same year, it was also screened at the Mumbai Film Festival, as part of the India Gold selection, as well as at the Indian Film Festival of Stuttgart. The film subsequently aired on PBS in the United States and on Mubi elsewhere.

== Reception ==
About Love has received a positive critical reception both within India and internationally.

In India, in a five star review, Mashable called it a "beautiful piece of cinema", though did criticise the shaky quality of the handheld camera footage as being at times distracting. Ishita Sengupta in The Indian Express commended the film for highlighting the role of women within Indian family structures, which are often patriarchal in nature, and called it "a lesson in owning [and] accepting your 'embarrassing' family".

Internationally, Ahendrila Goswani from High on Films called Phadke "comic as well as cruel" in how she portrayed her family, ultimately commending the "beauty" that emerged from its depiction of the mundaneness of the family's day-to-day life. Writing for Screen Daily, Nikki Baughan praised Phadke's "frank approach and eye for detail" in drawing poignancy from "quiet, unassuming moments". Deborah Young from The Hollywood Reporter called it a "small, unpretentious film about ordinary people".

== Awards ==
Phadke won the New Talent Award at the 2019 Sheffield International Documentary Festival for About Love. The film also won Best Film at the 2019 Indian Film Festival of Stuttgart.
