= TVF Media =

Independent multimedia company

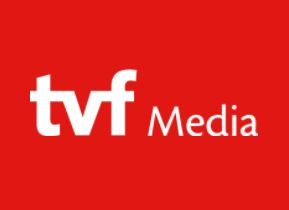
- Company type: Private company
- Industry: Film Production, Multimedia, Television Distribution, Other Holdings
- Headquarters: London, United Kingdom

TVF Media is an independent multimedia company located in central London. It was launched in 1983 by Hilary Lawson as Television and Film Productions plc.

It features television programming, international distribution, post production, communications for the healthcare and educational sectors, and video art.

TVF was described by the Hereford Times as "the UK's leading distributor of documentaries."
