= Wellington Cantonment =

Cantonment town in Tamil Nadu, India

Coordinates: 11°21′20″N 76°46′57″E

Wellington is a cantonment town in the Coonoor sub-division of Nilgiris District, in Tamil Nadu, India. One of its most famous residents was Field Marshal Sam Manekshaw, who died in the town on 27 June 2008. The town is adjacent to the town of Coonoor. Its Postal Index Number is 643231. Wellington is a Class II Cantonment.

== Landmark and geography ==
The Cantonment has a total area of 1647.65 acres.

== Demography ==
As of the 2011 census of India, the cantonment has a total population of 19462 residents, of which 12673 are civilians, and 6789 are Military population (personnel and families and dependants). Of the total population, males and females are in the ratio of 10867:8595 (79.09%). The skew is primarily on account of the very large population of single men as recruits at the MRC.

== See also ==
- Wellington, Tamil Nadu
- Black Bridge (The Nilgiris)
- Defence Services Staff College
- The Madras Regimental Centre
