= Neha Oberoi =

Indian actress

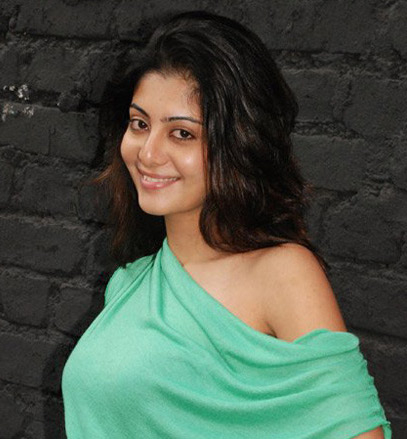
- Neha Oberoi at Dus Kahaniyaan promotional event
- Born: Mumbai
- Occupation: Actress
- Years active: 2005–2009
- Spouse: Vishal Shah (m. 2010)
- Family: Oberoi

Neha Oberoi is an Indian actress who has acted in Tollywood and Bollywood films.

== Personal life ==
Oberoi is the daughter of film producer Dharam Oberoi and niece of director Sanjay Gupta. She married Indian diamond merchant Vishal Shah on 14 December 2010.

== Career ==
She has appeared in the Bollywood films Dus Kahaniyaan, EMI and Woodstock Villa. She is currently shooting for an untitled film with Imran Khan.

Her foray into films started with the Chiranjeevi's brother Pawan Kalyan's Telugu movie Balu ABCDEFG and was followed by a role in one of the short films in Dus Kahaniyaan. Her role in Woodstock Villa won her much critical acclaim, yet the film failed to perform at the box office. She also worked in the famous 2005 remix song "SAJNA HAI MUJE"which was a major hit.

Oberoi is a member of International Film And Television Club of Asian Academy of Film & Television, Noida.

== Filmography ==
Year	Title	Role	Language	Note(s)
2005	Balu	Indira Priyadarshini "Indu"	Telugu	
2006	Brahmastram	Gayatri	Telugu	
2007	Dus Kahaniyaan	Neha	Hindi	
2008	EMI	Shilpa Sharma	Hindi	
2008	Woodstock Villa	Zara Kampani	Hindi	
2009	Aasman		Hindi	

== Awards ==
- Filmfare Best Supporting Actress Award (Telugu) - Balu ABCDEFG (2005)
