= Dus Kahaniyaan =

2007 Indian anthology film

- Promotional poster
- Directed by: Sanjay Gupta; Apoorva Lakhia; Meghna Gulzar; Rohit Roy; Hansal Mehta; Jasmeet Dhodhi
- Written by: Sanjay Gupta; S. Farhan; Hansal Mehta; Virag Mishra; Kartar Singh Duggal; Meghna Gulzar; Sudipto Chattopadhyay; Javed Siddiqui; Rajiv Gopalkrishnan; Kamlesh Pandey; Shivani Tibrewala; Gulzar; Farhaan Salaruddin
- Produced by: Sanjay Gupta
- Starring: Sanjay Dutt; Suniel Shetty; Nana Patekar; Naseeruddin Shah; Manoj Bajpayee; Arbaaz Khan; Jimmy Sheirgill; Amrita Singh; Minissha Lamba; Sudhanshu Pandey; Anupam Kher; Aftab Shivdasani; Diya Mirza; Mandira Bedi; Mahesh Manjrekar; Neha Dhupia; Shabana Azmi; Masumeh Makhija; Rohit Roy; Anita Hassanandani; Anuradha Patel; Dino Morea; Tarina Patel; Neha Oberoi; Parmeet Sethi; Anup Soni
- Cinematography: Hemant Chaturvedi; Chirantan Das; Sachin Krishn; Anshuman Mahaley; Vikash Nowlakha; Raja Syed; Amit Roy; Mahesh Aney; Sanjay F. Gupta
- Edited by: Bunty Nagi
- Music by: Gourov Dasgupta; Anand Raaj Anand; Bappi Lahiri; Shafqat Ali Khan
- Production companies: White Feather Films; Eros International
- Release date: 7 December 2007 (India)
- Running time: 114 minutes
- Country: India
- Language: Hindi
- Budget: ₹21 crore (US$2.2 million)
- Box office: ₹13 crore (US$1.3 million)

Dus Kahaniyaan (transl. Ten stories) is a 2007 Indian Hindi-language anthology film featuring ten different stories directed by a host of six directors: Sanjay Gupta, Apoorva Lakhia, Meghna Gulzar, Rohit Roy, Hansal Mehta and Jasmeet Dhodhi.

The film features an ensemble cast comprising Sanjay Dutt, Suniel Shetty, Nana Patekar, Naseeruddin Shah, Manoj Bajpayee, Arbaaz Khan, Jimmy Sheirgill, Amrita Singh, Minissha Lamba, Sudhanshu Pandey, Anupam Kher, Aftab Shivdasani, Diya Mirza, Mandira Bedi, Mahesh Manjrekar, Neha Dhupia, Shabana Azmi, Masumeh Makhija, Rohit Roy, Anita Hassanandani, Anuradha Patel, Dino Morea, Tarina Patel, Neha Oberoi, Parmeet Sethi and Anup Soni.

Dealing with themes of lust, infidelity, the religious divide, crime, punishment and the power of love, Dus Kahaniyaan was released theatrically on 7 December 2007 and flopped at the box office.

== Plot ==
=== Matrimony ===
The bored wife of an MNC vice president Rahul Sarin, Pooja, has an extramarital affair with Aditya Singh, an army officer she met on a chatroom. She meets him every Thursday on the pretext of visiting her aunt. At home she is a doting and dutiful wife. She describes her affair as not only for sex but also for genuine love and consideration. As it turns out, her lover has to report to his post and gives her a beautiful diamond necklace. She loves it but is hesitant to take it. When the officer insists, she devises a plan. She goes to a jeweller and hands over the necklace with an arrangement that she be given a coupon, which under the pretext of a lucky draw and she'd be given her necklace. The next morning, her husband goes to collect the "prize". He calls her from his office and asks her to come over to see what she has got. She goes with great enthusiasm, but to her utter dismay finds a small diamond ring. She comes out of his cabin and tries to call the jeweler. Her cell phone does not get reception, so she turns to her husband's secretary and asks her to dial the number, only to spot the necklace on the secretary. The secretary mentions that it is from her "boyfriend" revealing that her husband is also having an affair with his secretary however since she cannot confront him without revealing her own affair she is "hoisted with her own petard".

=== High on the Highway ===
Two college graduates, Kaamna and Kabir who are in love with each other have a habit of getting high and taking a walk along the highway. On the night after their graduation when they are walking down the road, a bunch of goons try to kidnap Kaamna. They succeed in spite of Kabir putting up a fight. Kaamna is rescued by cops but Kabir feels responsible for her kidnapping and slashes his wrists. He dies leaving Kaamna crying by his bed.

=== Pooranmasi (Full Moon Night) ===
Mala's daughter Mini has just been engaged and her father is out on business once again leaving the ladies alone. Mala has led a loveless life and on this particular day her daughter adorns her mother with a colourful dupatta (veil) and comments on how pretty she looks. Mala realises that it is the night of full moon, and her lover promised her long ago that he would be waiting outside the door every full moon night. For once she decides to open it and let her desire take over her. After spending the night with him in the fields she returns home in the morning; many villagers notice the colourful dupatta on her head and mistake her for her daughter. When the villagers come to break the marriage describing the incident, Mini learns that it was her mother who went to meet the man. She cannot recite what has happened, as it would defame her mother, but she in unable to bear the taunts of the villagers and thus she commits suicide by jumping into the well.

=== Strangers in the Night ===
Mahesh and Neha are husband and wife. They have the habit of discussing past distractions in their relationship. They do it on their every anniversary. Mahesh forces Neha to tell about her experience. She starts discussing how she once passionately kissed the guy's hand. She also describes how she was taken in a railway station's waiting room in a dark night. She tells that she would have done anything but did not do. Her husband becomes envious. Neha unravels the twist in the story. She ultimately reveals that she actually kisses his hand and hugs him to save a child. The child was being attacked by religious riots. And as the rioters cast and Neha's caste was same, that person did not attack her and by that time that child escaped. The love scenes were actually a part of their action.

=== Zahir ===
Saahil comes to stay in an apartment of one of his friends somewhere in Versova. He comes there after he gets a rejection from his girlfriend. There he finds Sia sharing an apartment in the same floor as him. They eventually become good friends. Saahil wants to go deep in the relationship but cannot do so because of Sia rejecting him. Saahil however still falls in love with Sia. One night when Saahil was with his friends and visiting many bars in the town to console himself he sees Sia. She is a dancer in a dance bar. After coming home, he goes to her apartment and confronts her and despite her attempts to explain the truth to him an intoxicated Saahil rapes her despite her pleas to stop him. The next day he wakes up and Sia has already left, however he finds a note from her. In this letter she had written that she has AIDS and that was the reason of her rejection of Saahil's love which was based on consideration for his health and wellbeing not his belief that she had intentionally rejected him. This story is told by Saahil where he reveals that Sia has died two years ago and a remorseful Saahil is waiting for his death.

=== Lovedale ===
Anya meets a lady on the train on her way home, where she was getting engaged. The lady gives her an earring and vanishes at Lovedale railway station. Anya, wanting to return the earring alights and follows the road to a house where Aman is painting. They become acquainted. Aman attends Anya's engagement and feels hurt. Anya is also unhappy and her father questions her doubt. Anya tells him about Aman and her father tells her his flashback about how he met a lady on the train to whom he had given one earring before the train left the station. Anya and her father compare the earrings and decide that her meeting Aman was no coincidence and she breaks the engagement to join Aman. However, the story unfolds with a vicious climax. Aman notices the earrings that Anya was wearing and, on questioning, he is informed that it was the earring that was given to her by the lady in the train. Aman shows her a picture of the lady: his mother who died 10 years ago.

=== Sex on the Beach ===
Dino finds a book on the beach and picks it up. The title of the book is 'Death'. He writes his name and date of birth as instructed and starts to read the book. A seductress steps out of a jet ski and sits down next to him. Wearing a golden bikini she invites him for dinner at 7 pm. Dino is on time and goes over well prepared with wine and condoms. When he is about to open her dress she tells that she will be back within two minutes with more provocative clothing and surprises which he would love taking off. But Dino falls into a nap and wakes up with a sound. He sees her dead in the bathroom. When he leans down to examine her closely she opens her eyes and he understands that she was actually a soul whose wishes had been left unfulfilled and chases him to the beach. She starts running after Dino which seems that she is a ghost. The process goes the whole night and in the morning Dino is found dead in the beach. All are surrounded him, the girl comes and saves Dino and asks him to come along with her. Dino goes with her leaving his earthly body behind.

=== Rice Plate ===
Shabana plays a staunch Hindu woman, on her way to visit her grandchildren by train. In a hurry she forgets her wallet in her house and heads to the station. Deliberately she sits only in a taxi with Hindu deity's photos (She dislikes Muslims). But then, she realizes that the driver is a Muslim. She misses her train and her next train is in two hours. She goes to a canteen and orders the cheapest meal, a plate of rice with the change she has and leaves her table to wash her hand. When she comes back she sees a Muslim looking man Dawoodi Bohra eating it. Angry that he stole her plate, Shabana forgets that he is a Muslim and starts eating out of the very same plate. Later she realizes it, and leaves the place, ashamed at herself. At the railway station she notices that she had left her luggage and handbag in the canteen and goes back. There she finds her belongings near a table and a rice plate on it. Then she realizes that the Muslim man never stole her rice plate, he was, in fact, eating out of his own one, and yet he did not yell at her when she snatched it from him and spoke rudely to him. Later in the station, she offers place to a Muslim family, which shows that she had changed her attitude.

=== Gubbare (Balloons) ===
Simran and her husband are newlyweds on a bus who start a small quarrel. Simran moves away from to sit adjacent to Nana who is carrying 11 smiley balloons with him. On questioning he tells her how he has to present his wife with the balloons every time he has angered her and how she bakes a cake if she angers him. He explains that life is too short to spend fighting. When getting down at the stop he forgets to take with him the sorry card that he had written for his wife. Simran follows him to give it to him and she notices him speaking to his wife's grave; it is revealed that his wife died 8 years ago. She realizes that he loved his wife, and still does, yet she will now never be with him. She returns to the bus and sits beside her husband, and they do not quarrel. The essence of the story is that life is too short to be wasted away on silly fights.

=== Rise & Fall ===
The story begins with Nawab Affi telling Baba Hyderabadi that someone is going to kill him. Baba says that if there could be anybody who could kill him, it would be Affi. The story cuts to a flashback. It shows two young kids. One of them gets paid to kill a person. They both kill the person. The kids are Baba and Affi. As kids they rise and as adults they fall because of two children shooting them as in the flashback they are now the dons.

== Cast ==
Matrimony	High on the Highway	Pooranmasi	Strangers in the Night	Zahir
Arbaaz Khan as MNC Vice President; Mandira Bedi as Mandira; Sudhanshu Pandey as Army Officer	Jimmy Sheirgill as Jimmy; Masumeh Makhija as Masumeh	Amrita Singh as Mala; Parmeet Sethi as Amrita's lover; Minnisha Lamba as Minisha	Mahesh Manjrekar as Mahesh; Neha Dhupia as Neha	Manoj Bajpayee as Sahil; Dia Mirza as Sia
Lovedale	Sex on the Beach	Rice Plate	Gubbare	Rise & Fall
Aftab Shivdasani as Aftab; Neha Oberoi as Neha; Anupam Kher as Neha's father; Anuradha Patel as Aftab's mother	Dino Morea as Dino; Tarina Patel as Seductress / Ghost	Shabana Azmi as Hindu woman; Naseeruddin Shah as Muslim man; Anup Soni as Taxi driver	Nana Patekar as Nana; Rohit Roy as Rohit; Anita Hassanandani as Anita	Sanjay Dutt as Baba Hyderabadi; Suniel Shetty as Nawab Affi

== Music ==
Dus Kahaniyaan

Soundtrack album
- Released: 6 September 2007
- Genre: Film soundtrack
- Label: White Feather Films

The soundtrack was released on 6 September 2007. Joginder Tuteja from Bollywood Hungama gave it 4 stars out of 5 stars, noting that it had everything for everyone and that too in a lavish and wholehearted manner, in the form of a Lounge and Club outing mixing dance numbers with heartfelt melodies as well as Gulzar poems for each of the film's 10 stories, recited by stars from the film.

Song	Singer(s)	Lyricist	Music
"Aaja Soniye"	Shweta Vijay, Sudhanshu Pandey	Virag Mishra	Gourov Dasgupta
"Bhula Diya"	Anand Raj Anand	Ibrahim Ashq	Anand Raj Anand
"Bin Tum"	KK	Panchhi Jalonvi	Anand Raj Anand
"Dus Kahaaniyan"	Aanchal, KK, Vinod Rathod & Yazin Nizar	Virag Mishra	Gourov Dasgupta
"Jaaniye"	Aanchal, Sunidhi Chauhan	Virag Mishra	Gourov Dasgupta
"Kaala Peela"	Shafqat Ali Khan	Virag Mishra	Shafqat Ali Khan
"Mushkil Kushaa"	Kshitij Tarey	Panchhi Jalonvi	Bappi Lahiri, Bappa B. Lahiri
"Nach Le Soniye"	Mika Singh	Virag Mishra	Gourov Dasgupta
"O Maahiya"	Shweta Vijay, KK	Panchhi Jalonvi	Gourov Dasgupta
"Vichodeya Ne"	Shafqat Ali Khan	Ambar Hoshiyarpuri	Shafqat Ali Khan

== Reception ==
=== Critical response ===
Times of India gave the film 3.5 stars out of 5, remarking that almost all the stories were deftly told, with the mandatory twist in the climax which kept the viewer riveted. Taran Adarsh from Bollywood Hungama gave the film 3 stars out of 5, praising most of the stories, but was unimpressed with the High On The Highway and Rise & Fall segments. Elvis Dsilva from Rediff.com gave the movie 2.5 stars out of 5 and was similarly unimpressed with High On The Highway, while feeling the Rise & Fall story brought the film to an "appropriately flashy close." Sonia Chopra of Sify gave the movie 1.5 stars calling the movie balderdash.

=== Box office ===
The film opened with a collection of ₹1 crore (US$100,000) and collecting ₹5.98 crore (US$620,000) in the opening weekend. Made on a ₹21 crore (US$2.2 million) budget, the film failed to recover its budget and failed commercially.
