= Wellington, Tamil Nadu =

Wellington Jakkatalla Badaga:ಜಗತಲ ஜகதலா
- Town
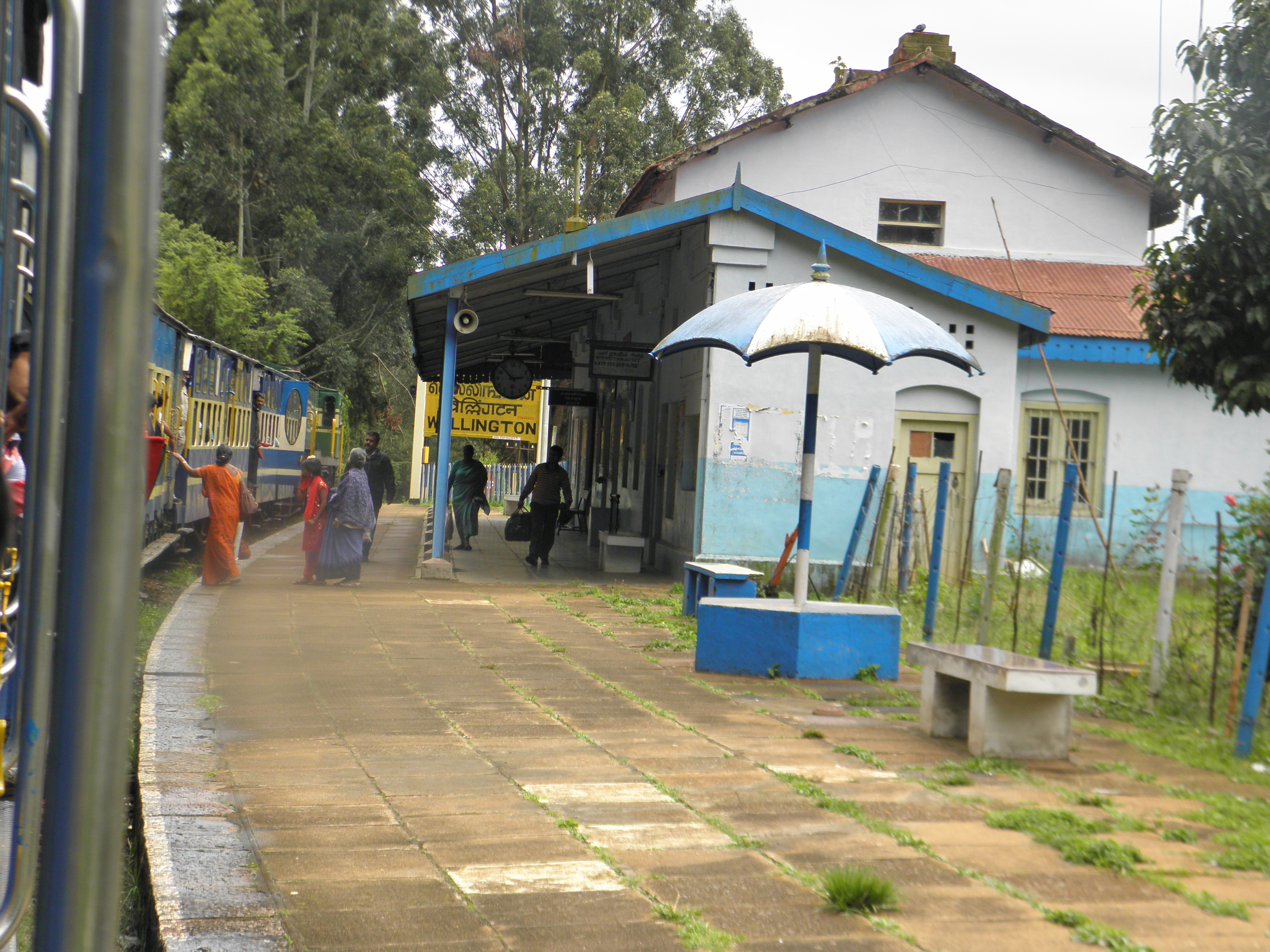
- Mettupalayam-Ooty Mountain Train Hauled By Diesel Locomotive approaching Wellington Station
- Nickname: Jacketallah
- Wellington, Nilgiris, Tamil Nadu, India
- Coordinates: 11.3636°N 76.7885°E
- Country: India
- State: Tamil Nadu
- District: Nilgiris
- Elevation: 1,855 m (6,086 ft)

Population (2001)
  - Total: 20,220

Language
  - Official: Tamil
- Time zone: UTC+5:30 (IST)
- PIN: 643231
- Vehicle registration: TN43

Wellington (Native name: Jakkatalla (Badaga)) is a town in the Nilgiris District of the Indian state of Tamil Nadu, located 3 km (1.9 mi) north of Coonoor on the NH-181. The town includes the Wellington Bazaar, and the Wellington Cantonment. The Wellington Cantonment is home to The Madras Regimental Centre (MRC) and The Defence Services Staff College (DSSC). The Nilgiri passenger train calls at Wellington railway station.

The settlement of Wellington lies immediately outside of Wellington Cantonment, which was earlier known as Jakkatalla (or Jacketallah) from the Badaga Village of that name to the north of it. In 1852 Sir Richard Armstrong, the then Commander-in-Chief, recommended that the name should be changed to Wellington in honour of the Iron Duke, who had previously evinced an interest in the establishment of a sanatorium in the Nilgiris. In 1860 Sir Charles Trevelyan held that this interesting Military Establishment could not be connected with a more appropriate name than Wellington. He, therefore, ordered that Jakkatalla Station be called henceforth Wellington.

The construction of the barracks began in 1852 and was completed in 1860, popularly known as Wellington Barracks. It assumed importance in the Station, and since February 1942 is occupied by the Madras Regimental Centre. The Wellington Barracks is now named as Srinagesh Barracks in memory of the First Indian Colonel of the Madras Regiment Gen. S. M. Shrinagesh.

The native Bazaar, now known as the Cantonment Market, is away from the Barracks and is on the other side of the stream after crossing the Waterloo Bridge (commonly known as Black Bridge, a tarred wooden construction, reconstructed in March 2009, and renamed as Manekshaw Bridge in memory of Field Marshal SHFJ Manekshaw) onto NH 181.

== Geography ==
The district is tucked away in a north-west corner of the State of Tamil Nadu, and directly shares borders with the states of Karnataka in the North, and Kerala in the south. Perched atop a plateau of the southern reaches of the Western Ghats, the district shares a common liking among tourists with Kodaikanal, Munnar, Wayanad, and Palakkad. The topography of the district is hilly and abounds in lush evergreen forests, glens, meadows, downs and tea estates. With an endless variety of exotic flora and fauna, the district boasts of a 5520 sq km protected biosphere (established in 1986) and prides itself in being the most environment-friendly district in the country. Some major streams originate in this district; the Bhawani River of Tamil Nadu is one of them. Coonoor River (it joins the Bhawani near Metupalayam) originates close to Wellington. Wellington is located at 11.37°N 76.8°E. It has an average elevation of 1855 metres (6085 feet). The Wellington Railway Station lies at 1758 m above sea level. Wellington has a marsh located inside the cantonment land, whose run-off feeds the Mynala stream.

== Demographics ==
As of 2001 India census, Wellington had a population of 20,220. Males constitute 54% of the population and females 46%. Wellington has an average literacy rate of 82%, higher than the national average of 59.5%: male literacy is 87%, and female literacy is 76%. In Wellington, 12% of the population is under 6 years of age.

== Weather ==
The one word that best describes the weather in Coonoor/Wellington is salubrious, a term made famous by the Defence Services Staff College! The climate is moderate and gains the advantage of latitude in winter and altitude in summer. The weather is neither tropical (given the latitude) nor humid (despite the lush greenery), but generally pleasant throughout the year. The temperature in summer (the dry months of April-May) swings between 27 °C by day, and can be a nippy 14 °C at night in the valley bowls; the slopes record around 17–18 °C at night/early mornings. Winter temperature goes down to about 18 °C in the day and a nippy 11 °C by night; valley bowls record a sub-zero temperature during December-January, with hoar frost before sunrise.

The atmosphere is clear in comparison to most cities; consequently, the UV index is high throughout the year, and the direct sun can scorch even when the temperature is not so high.

The rainy season is technically during the receding monsoon in October-November, but the district sees spillover rain (the location is not exactly leeward for the monsoon current hitting Kerala) during the south-west monsoon as well. Humidity ranges between 70% and 90% with a gentle breeze blowing at most times during the rainy season. During the dry spells, it can dip to 40%. It is never stuffy.

Mid-May to mid-July is a season for thunderstorms, most of which originate in the mouth of the valley leading up from Mettupalayam to Coonoor. Thunder can be scaringly loud; those that have not experienced such thunder must enjoy nature in its wild entirety! The faint-of-heart are advised to get under a mattress during such occurrences. The normal time of occurrence of thunderstorms is during early noon to early evening, or late afternoon to early night. An odd occurrence is also recorded around midnight.

== Reaching Wellington ==
Wellington is connected by road and Rail to Mettupalayam, the nearest foothill town and is located enroute to Udhagamandalam Hill Station along NH181. Coimbatore and Tiruppur are nearest metropolitan cities to get accessed with. Mettupalayam bus stand located 40 kilometres from Wellington has well connected to all major cities of Tamil Nadu and nearby states of Kerala and Karnataka. Mettupalayam also has a Railway Station (MTP) which has day round connectivity to Coimbatore, Madurai and Chennai Central. Coimbatore is the predominant air and railhead (CJB being the airport, and CBE being the railway station). Coimbatore Junction railway station lies at a road distance of 80 km and Coimbatore International Airport at 90 km from Wellington.

Air connectivity to Coimbatore exists from Hyderabad (HYD), Delhi (DEL), Mumbai (BOM), Chennai (MAA), Kochi (COK), and Bangalore (BLR). From other locations, connecting flights will have to be located. Coimbatore is an Air India hub, except for the Bangalore leg.

All long-distance trains originating from, or transiting through, Hyderabad/Vijayawada/ Bangalore, and headed to Trivandrum/Cochin, route via Coimbatore. Intercity trains run from Chennai (MAS) and Bangalore (SBC).

Wellington can also be accessed by road from Bengaluru (Bangalore), via Mysuru (Mysore) Gudalur and Ooty.

== Schools ==
- Army Public School. A school registered with CBSE, and functioning under the aegis of Army Education Society, the school has classes till XII. The school tailors its curriculum to have all interactions in sync with the college curriculum (school breaks coincide with college breaks).
- Kendriya Vidyalaya, Wellington. The school is located near Circle Quarters, and has classes till XII.
- Holy Innocents Children's School. Located inside the Cantonment area on private land, this school is the one of choice for parents with children between classes III-VI.
- Holy Angels Matriculation School. The school is run by the Tamil Nadu State Board, and offers schooling up to grade X. The school is located on private land inside the cantonment.
- Cantonment School. The School was started in 2010, with 33 students. The school caters to children that reside within the Cantonment, but extends to the neighbouring settlements as well. Today, the school has a student strength of 750, and 38 teachers. The school is till Grade X, and follows the Tamil Nadu State Board. All classrooms are smart-board enabled.

== Eighth Market ==
Traditionally, the second Sunday of the month was organised as a local market, outside the gates of Cordite Factory, located at Aruvankadu/Aravangadu, on the main Coonoor-Ooty road (NH 181). The local story around the choice of date is to do with the availability of salary in cash, and the second Sunday being best suited to make all necessary purchases for the month. With the choking of traffic becoming a nuisance, the local market has shifted to the Wellington Stadium, below the Railway Station, and next to the Cantonment Board Office. Sellers reach as early as 5 am, to choose the spot of their choice. The market sells cotton products from Tiruppur and Palladam, hosiery, woollens, inner-ware and socks, shoes, kitchen-ware, fresh garden produce, greens and fruit, and some enterprising ones set up breakfast stalls for fresh dosai, idli, pongal or upma.
