= Wellington railway station (Tamil Nadu) =

Railway station in Tamil Nadu, India

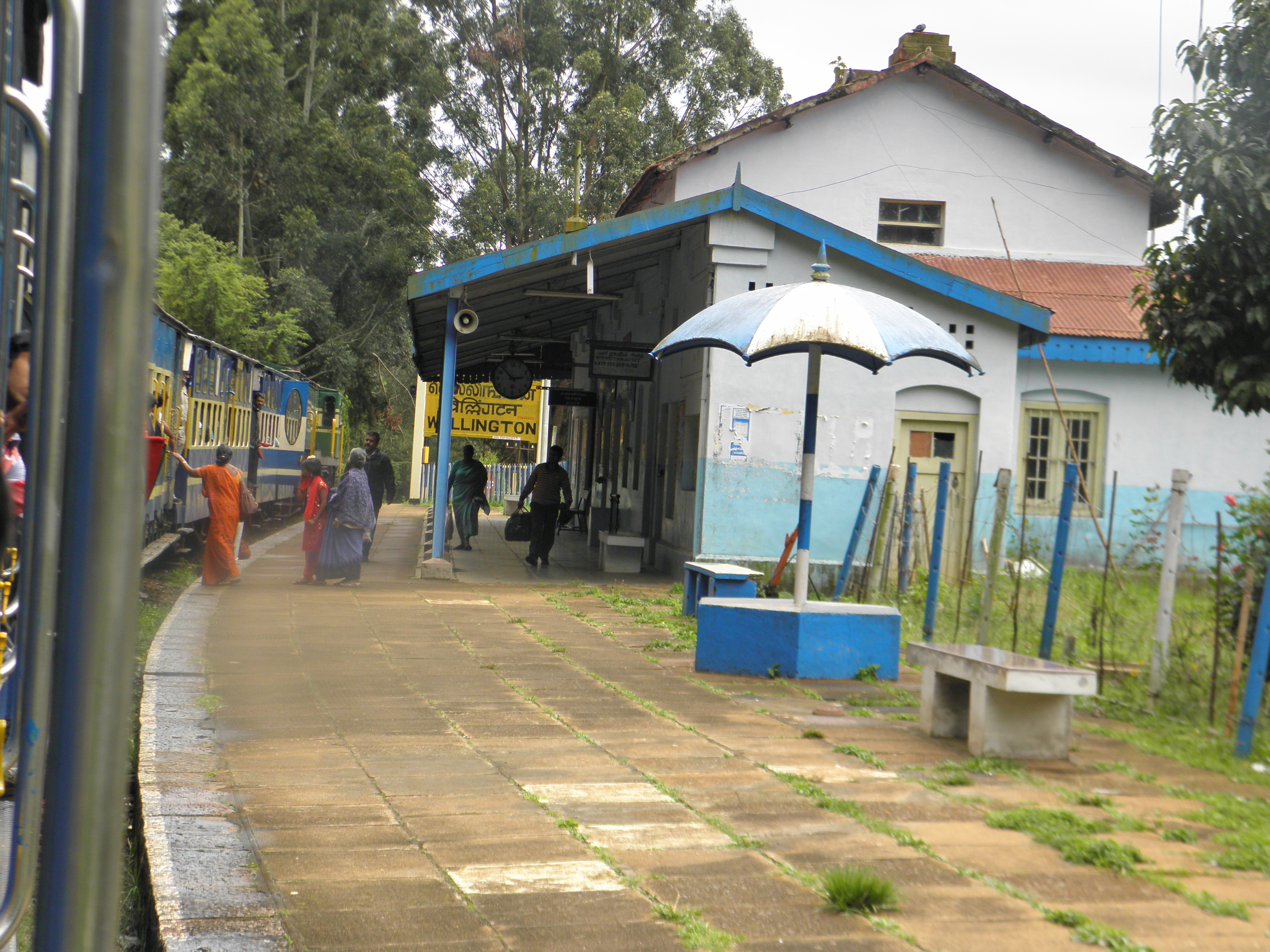

General information
- Location: India
- Coordinates: 11.37°N 76.8°E
- Elevation: 1,778 metres (5,833 ft)
- System: Light rail
- Owner: Indian Railways
- Operator: Southern Railway zone
- Line: Nilgiri Mountain Railway
- Platforms: 1
- Connections: Bus

Construction
- Structure type: At-grade
- Parking: Yes
- Cycle facilities: Yes

Other information
- Station code: WEL
- Fare zone: Indian Railways

History
- Opened: 1908; 118 years ago
Location
- Location within India Location within Tamil Nadu

Wellington railway station (station code: WEL) is an NSG–6 category Indian railway station in Salem railway division of Southern Railway zone. It is a railway station serving Wellington town, near Coonoor in the Indian state of Tamil Nadu. The station is a part of the World Heritage Nilgiri Mountain Railway.
