= Aravankadu railway station =

Railway station in Tamil Nadu, India

Aravankadu
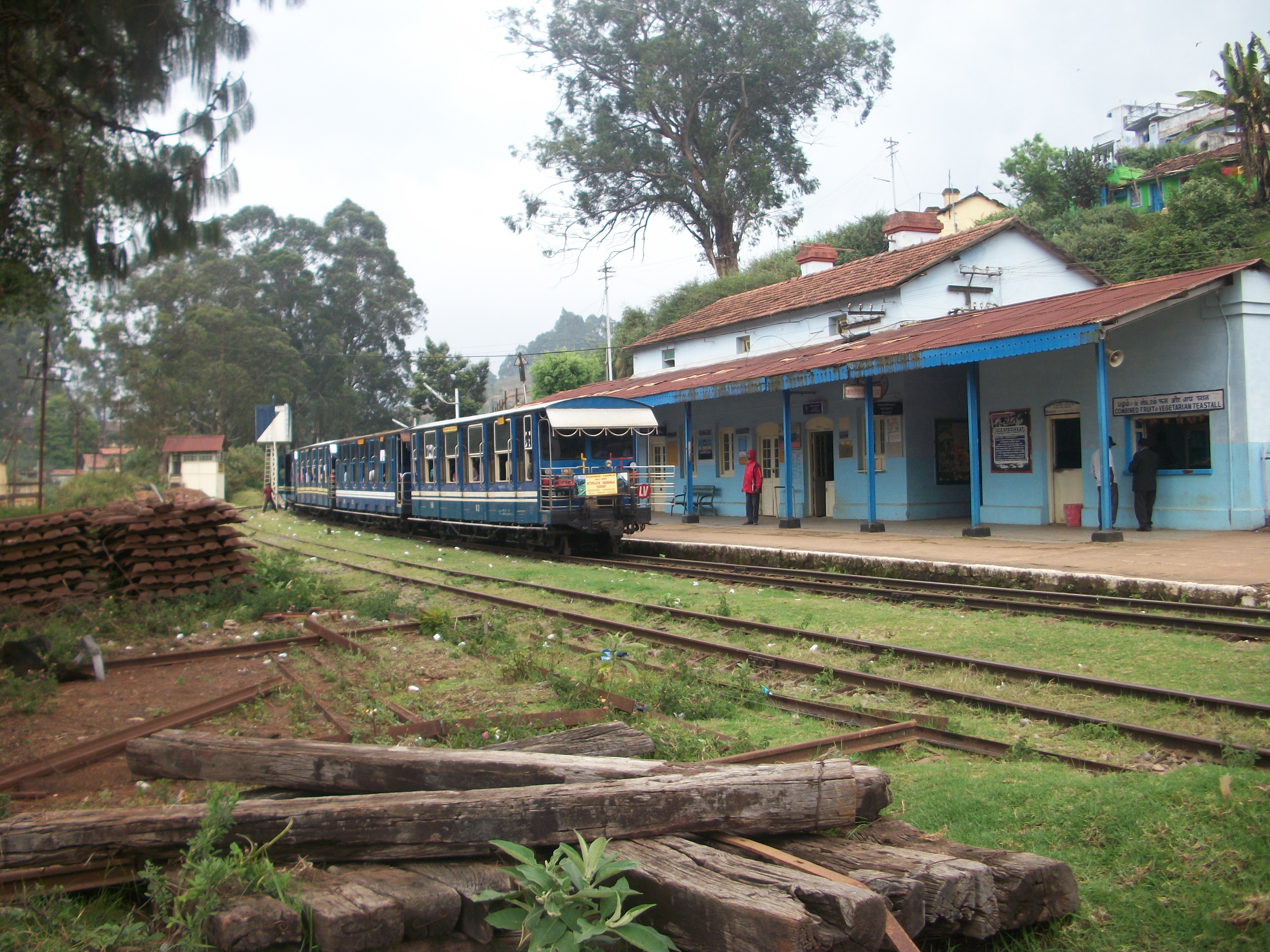

General information
- Location: India
- Coordinates: 11.21°N 76.46°E
- Elevation: 1,887 metres (6,191 ft)
- System: Light rail
- Owner: Indian Railways
- Operator: Southern Railway zone
- Line: Nilgiri Mountain Railway
- Platforms: 1
- Connections: Bus

Construction
- Structure type: At-grade
- Parking: Yes
- Cycle facilities: Yes

Other information
- Station code: AVK
- Fare zone: Indian Railways

History
- Opened: 1908; 118 years ago
Location
- Location within India Location within Tamil Nadu

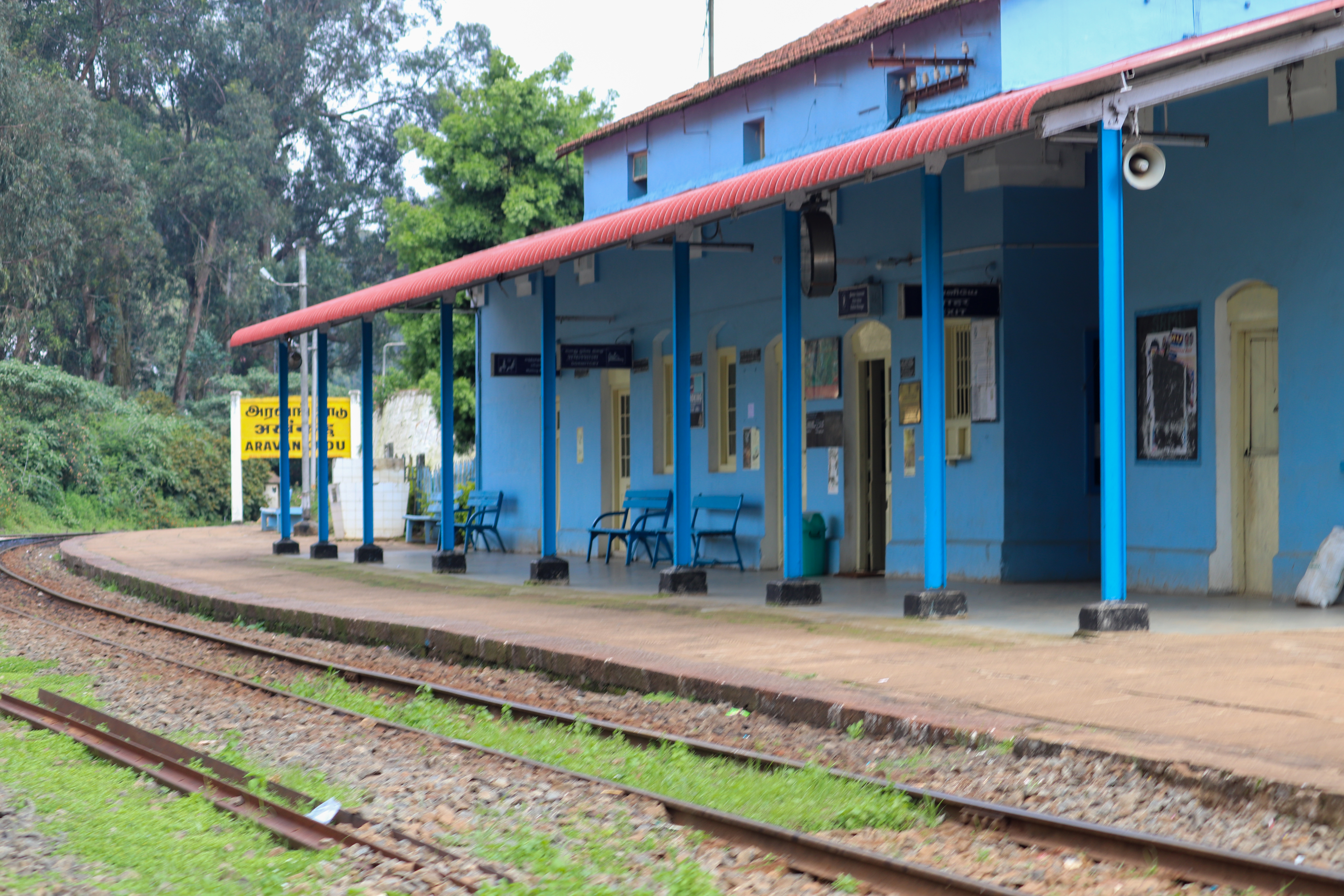
The station platform, looking towards Coonoor

Aravankadu railway station (station code: AVK) is an NSG–6 category Indian railway station in Salem railway division of Southern Railway zone. It serves Aruvankadu, a hill station in Nilgiris district of the Indian state of Tamil Nadu. Located between Coonoor and Udhagamandalam, it is one of the stations on the Nilgiri Mountain Railway route, currently declared a World Heritage Site by UNESCO.
