= Khauff =

- Promotional Poster
- Directed by: Sanjay Gupta
- Written by: Anand Wardhan (dialogues)
- Screenplay by: Sanjay Gupta; Sutanu Gupta
- Story by: Sanjay Gupta
- Produced by: Vijay Tolani
- Starring: Sanjay Dutt; Manisha Koirala
- Cinematography: Kabir Lal
- Edited by: Dilip-Zafar; Afaque Hussain
- Music by: Anu Malik
- Production company: Vijay Tolani Productions
- Release date: 3 March 2000
- Running time: 122 minutes
- Country: India
- Language: Hindi
- Budget: ₹7.5 crore
- Box office: ₹10.58 crore

Khauff (translation: Fear) is a 2000 Indian Hindi-language action thriller film directed by Sanjay Gupta, starring Sanjay Dutt and Manisha Koirala. It was an unofficial remake of the American film The Juror. It was released on 3 March 2000.

== Plot ==
Neha witnesses the Mafia slaying of a police officer and is forced to give a confession to the police, putting her life in danger. Meanwhile, Neha falls in love with Vicky, aka Babu. However, she realizes Vicky is not really who he is and is actually an assassin, hired to prevent her from testifying against the culprits. Then begins her uncertain life. In the end, Babu kills all the culprits. Neha kills Babu. Before dying, Babu realises his mistake and says that he has done a good job, thus ending the fearful life which made her life a hell.

== Cast ==
- Sanjay Dutt as Babu / Vicky / Anthony
- Manisha Koirala as Neha Verma
- Sharad Kapoor as Inspector Arjun
- Simran as Ritu Pereira
- Mukesh Khanna as ACP Jaidev Singh
- Suresh Oberoi as Mr. Singhania
- Tinnu Anand as Advocate Bansal
- Jaspal Bhatti as Hawa Singh
- Farida Jalal as Mrs. Jaidev Singh
- Parmeet Sethi as Samrat Singhania
- Navin Nischol as Judge
- Daler Mehndi as himself in "Nach Baby"
- Raveena Tandon as herself in "Nach Baby"

== Production ==
The film started production in 1997 but, due to various delays, was completed and released in 2000.

== Music ==
Khauff

Soundtrack album by Anu Malik and Sajid-Wajid
- Released: 1999
- Genre: Feature film soundtrack
- Label: T-Series

All tracks were given by Anu Malik and one song from duo Sajid–Wajid for "Raja Ki Qaid Mein". The song "Kehte Hain Jo Log Ishq Walon Ko Samjhaaye (Jo Dil Rakhta Hai Wo Mauj)" was included in the film at a later stage. However, its sound track and further details are not available.

Khauff track listing
No.	Title	Lyrics	Music	Singer(s)	Length
1.	"Nach Baby Nach Kudi"	Dev Kohli	Anu Malik	Daler Mehndi, Asha Bhosle	7:28
2.	"Nateeja Hamari Mohabbat Ka"	Rahat Indori	Anu Malik	Alka Yagnik, Kumar Sanu	6:41
3.	"Oh Gori Gori"	Mehboob	Anu Malik	Kumar Sanu	6:10
4.	"Saiyan More Saiyan"	Rani Malik	Anu Malik	Alka Yagnik, Sapna Awasthi, Shankar Mahadevan, Ehsaan	6:15
5.	"Raja Ki Qaid Mein"	Rani Malik	Sajid–Wajid	Jaspinder Narula, Sukhwinder Singh	5:40
6.	"Hye Hye Ye Hawa"	Mehboob	Anu Malik	Anuradha Paudwal & Vinod Rathod	7:21
7.	"Kehte Hain Jo Log Ishq Walon Ko Samjhaaye(Jo Dil Rakhta Hai Wo Mauj)"	Not Available	Not Available	Sukhwinder Singh, Alka Yagnik	4:30
Total length:					44:05

== Reception ==
Aparajita Saha of Rediff.com wrote, "In spite of the cliches, there are a few interesting twists and turns that save the film from being utterly predictable, though eventually, the storyline does succumb to the usual love triumphing over evil. There are times you find your way to the edge of the seat, only to comfortably settle back again."
