= Jung (2000 film) =

- Promotional poster of the film
- Directed by: Sanjay Gupta
- Screenplay by: Abhinav Kashyap; Anurag Kashyap
- Produced by: Satish Tandon
- Starring: Sanjay Dutt; Jackie Shroff; Aditya Pancholi; Raveena Tandon; Shilpa Shetty
- Cinematography: Sameer Arya
- Music by: Anu Malik, Bappi Lahiri as a Background music score
- Distributed by: Digital Entertainment
- Release date: 12 May 2000
- Running time: 142 minutes
- Country: India
- Language: Hindi
- Budget: ₹82.5 million
- Box office: ₹114 million

Jung (transl. Battle) is a 2000 Indian Hindi-language action thriller film directed by Sanjay Gupta. The film features Sanjay Dutt, Jackie Shroff, Aditya Pancholi, Raveena Tandon and Shilpa Shetty. The film has some similarities to the Hollywood film Desperate Measures.

The film was plagued with production problems due to creative differences between the main crew of the film. The film was finally released worldwide on 12 May 2000.

== Plot ==
Police Inspector Veer Chauhan is an honest and diligent man, who lives in India with his wife, Naina, and a son, Sahil. While Veer likes to go by the book, his partner, Inspector Khan, is exactly the opposite, reckless, and trigger-happy. When Veer is told that his son requires a bone marrow transplant, Veer does his best, but is unable to come up with any donors, and is told that Sahil may not live long. Veer finds out that the only person who has the same bone marrow is Bali, a criminal, but the only problem is Bali is not likely to consider donating any organ of his body, as Veer was the one who had arrested him. A short while later, Bali appears to have a change of heart, agrees to be a donor, and is transported to the hospital, but escapes. After escaping the hospital, Bali kills the evil Inspector Khan. Bali manages to wear a police uniform, and he escapes the hospital.

== Cast ==
- Jackie Shroff as Inspector Veer Chauhan
- Sanjay Dutt as Bali
- Raveena Tandon as Naina V. Chauhan
- Aditya Pancholi as Inspector Khan
- Shilpa Shetty as Tara, Balli's Girlfriend
- Saurabh Shukla as Musa
- Neeraj Vora as Lachmandas "Lacchu" Dholakia
- Jash Trivedi as Sahil V. Chauhan, Veer Chauhan's Son (as Master Jash)
- Sachin Khedekar as Doctor
- Navin Nischol as Police Commissioner
- Sanjay Mishra as Isha
- Bali Brahmbhatt as Dancer in Kadi Te Aana
- Sandhya Mridul as Dancer in Kadi Te Aana

== Music ==
All music is composed by Anu Malik.

No.	Title	Lyrics	Singer(s)	Length
1.	"Aaila Re..."	Sameer	Alka Yagnik, Anu Malik	5:47
2.	"Mere Bina Tum"	Sameer	Kumar Sanu, Alka Yagnik	5:31
3.	"Kadi Te Aana"	Sameer	Anu Malik, Jaspinder Narula	6:41
4.	"Jung (Theme Song)"	Sameer	Hariharan, Mahalakshmi Iyer	6:20
5.	"Ram Kare"	Sameer	Pankaj Udhas, Karsan Sagathia	7:01
6.	"Dil Mein Jigar Mein"	Sameer	Kumar Sanu, Hema Sardesai	6:35
7.	"She Gives Me Fever"	Dev Kohli	Anu Malik	6:54
8.	"Title Music"		Instrumental	1:57

== Reception ==
The film received mixed reviews from critics. Taran Adarsh of Bollywood Hungama gave the film 2/5 and stated, "Performance-wise, if JUNG belongs to anyone, it is Sanjay Dutt who breathes life into his characterisation. His look is deadly and he carries the most difficult of scenes with aplomb. His performance in this film can be compared to the one in VAASTAV. He is that effective. It is indeed sad that the actor has chosen to disassociate himself from this project, for this role sees him in complete form yet again. Jackie Shroff manages to hold your interest in dramatic portions. Both the heroines ? Raveena Tandon and Shilpa Shetty ? spring a surprise by making their presence felt in a male-dominated show. Raveena impresses a great deal in emotional scenes, while Shilpa is equally competent in a role that was difficult to portray. Aditya Panscholi is effective, but his characterisation is not too well defined. Neeraj Vora's comedy falls flat. To sum up, JUNG has face value, ample masala for the masses and of course, 'Aaila Re', which is one of the major draws. Besides these aspects, the film has generated tremendous controversy, thereby attracting big publicity. Keeping the above factors in mind and also the fact that the opening has been very encouraging, the film is sure to reach the safety mark. However, trimming the film by at least twenty minutes (deleting the two songs is a must!) will make the second half more gripping and effective, thereby giving a boost to its box-office prospects." Sukanya Verma of Rediff.com gave a negative review, stating, "Dutt has been playing the antihero in so many films since Khalnayak that he sleepwalks through this one. Though someone with good diction has dubbed for him, the voice sounds nothing like his. Jackie Shroff wears the same confused expression through the film. Raveena Tandon underplays her role and gives a decent performance. Shilpa Shetty's role in the film is hardly worth a mention yet, as Dutt's hot girlfriend, she manages to deliver the goods".

== Controversy ==
Producer Satish Tandon and Sanjay Gupta had differences during the making of this film. Gupta was disappointed by Tandon, who added unwanted scenes without Gupta's permission. This resulted in Gupta withdrawing himself from credits and he wasn't credited in the film. But in the end credits, he was credited. Sanjay Dutt, one of the best friends of Sanjay Gupta, refused to dub the film, and his voice was dubbed by another person.
