= Coonoor railway station =

Railway station in Tamil Nadu, India

Coonoor
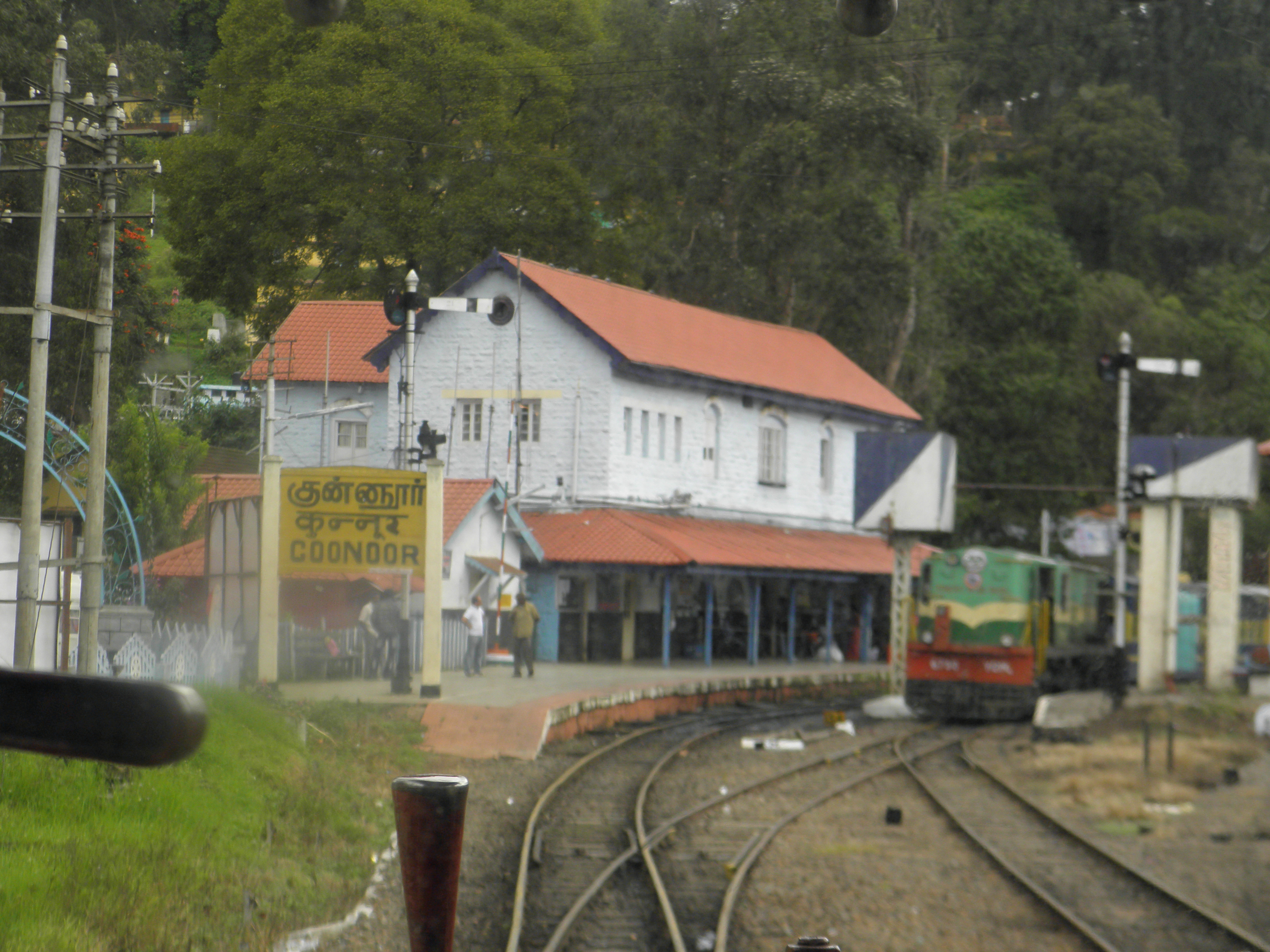

General information
- Location: India
- Coordinates: 11.4053°N 76.6962°E
- Elevation: 1,719 metres (5,640 ft)
- System: train station
- Owner: Indian Railways
- Operator: Southern Railway zone
- Line: Nilgiri Mountain Railway
- Platforms: 2
- Connections: Bus

Construction
- Structure type: At-grade
- Parking: Yes
- Cycle facilities: Yes

Other information
- Station code: ONR
- Fare zone: Indian Railways

History
- Opened: 1908; 118 years ago
Location
- Location within India Location within Tamil Nadu

Coonoor railway station (station code: ONR) is an NSG–4 category Indian railway station in Salem railway division of Southern Railway zone. It serves Coonoor, a municipality town and popular hill station in the Nilgiris district of Tamil Nadu. The train station is a part of the Nilgiri Mountain Railway, a World Heritage Site. The train station is an important rail hub for trains passing to Udhagamandalam (Ooty).

== Projects and development ==
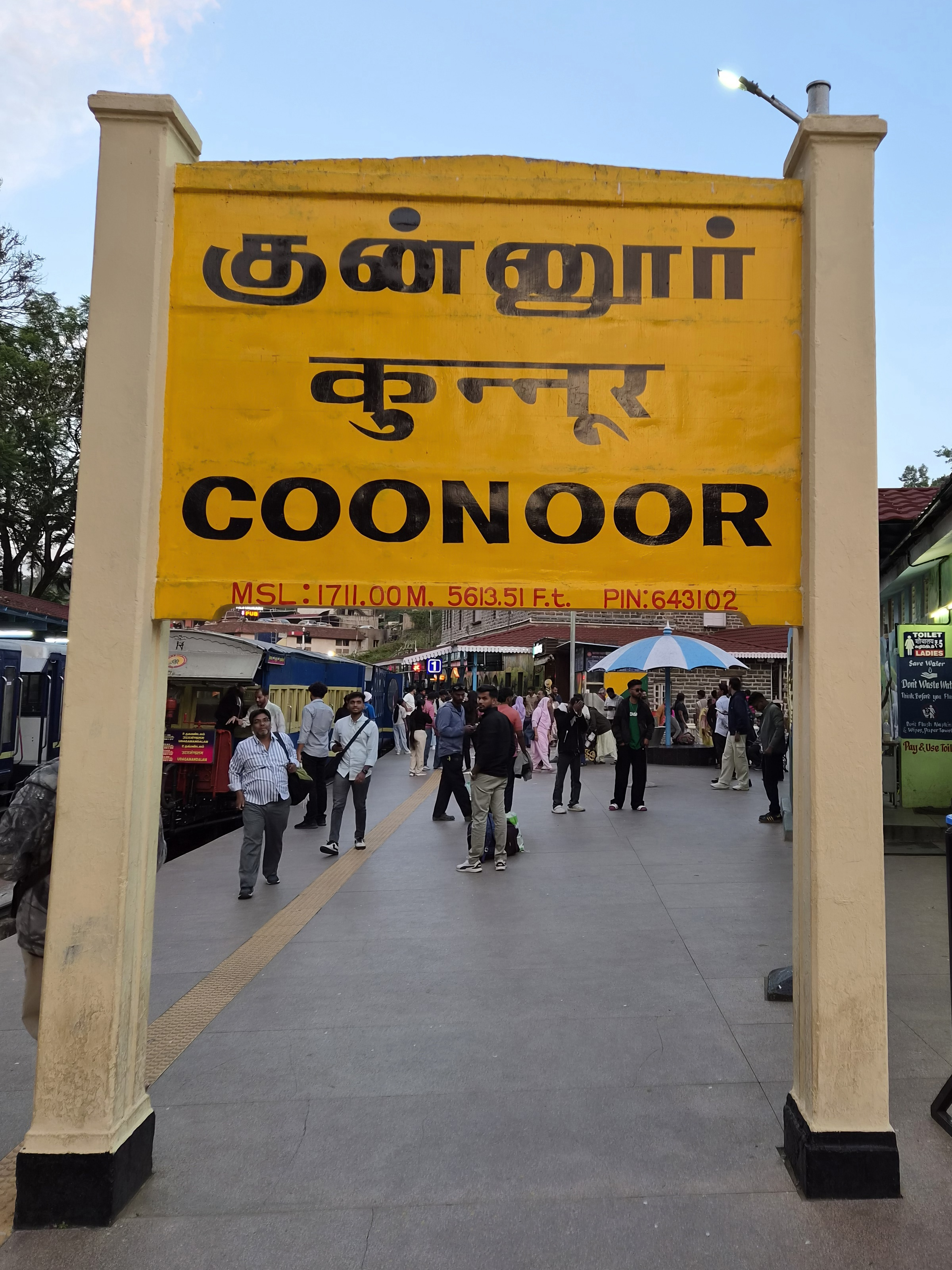

It is one of the 73 stations in Tamil Nadu to be named for upgradation under Amrit Bharat Station Scheme of Indian Railways.

== See also ==
- Media related to Coonoor railway station at Wikimedia Commons
- Nilgiri Mountain Railway
