= Brahmastram =

- DVD cover
- Directed by: Surya Kiran
- Written by: Bhaskarbhatla; Rajashekaran (dialogues)
- Screenplay by: Surya Kiran
- Story by: Surya Kiran
- Produced by: Nukarapu Surya Prakasa Rao
- Starring: Jagapati Babu; Neha Oberoi
- Cinematography: Sarath
- Edited by: Nandamuri Hari
- Music by: Vaibhava
- Production company: S. P. Creations
- Release date: 11 August 2006
- Country: India
- Language: Telugu

Brahmastram (transl. The Ultimate Weapon) is a 2006 Indian Telugu-language action film, produced by Nukarapu Surya Prakasa Rao on S. P. Creations banner and directed by Surya Kiran. The film stars Jagapati Babu and Neha Oberoi, with music composed by first-timers Vaibhava Group.

== Plot ==
Bangaram, an amnesia kid, ties a holy Hindu wedding chain Mangalsutra to his wrest, whom a cut-throat gangster Rudra raises. Amazingly, he turns into a raging bull and an unstoppable machine whenever they remove the wedding chain, so Rudra molds him as an ultimate weapon. Years pass, and Bangaram grows up in a cage unkempt, uncivilized, and cannot speak properly. Besides, Vasudev, a blind pianist, resides with his daughter Gayatri and owns an instrumental shop. On trafficking, Bangaram is attracted to Vasu Dev's music and enters his shop, where he gets some bondage with the piano.

After a while, Rudra's gang encounters a turf war, which leaves bloody carnage. However, Bangaram absconds with deadly wounds and lands at Vasudev. Since he is the second one, he is familiar with rescues and shelters. Gayatri sculpts him how as a real man in a civilized society and calls him Guru. In her acquaintance, he enjoys gladsomeness and adores Gayatri, whose word is an ordinance. Preceding, she too reciprocates Guru's innocent and naïve ways of looking at life and falls for him. At that time, Vasudev stands an opportunity to regain his sight, which requires ₹ five lakhs, and it is pricy for Gayatri; just when Rudra and his men escaped from death, they intended to recapture Guru, but to no avail.

Meanwhile, Guru & Gayatri visit an old church where his memories haunt him and recognize his mother Thulasi's photograph. Through the church's father, they are aware that Thulasi is a volunteer who her husband brutally kills out of suspicion. Being conscious of it, the Guru freaks out on Rudra about his father's whereabouts. Whereat, Rudra artifices him by assuring him to catch, but for which he should move according to him. Guru borrows the needed amount for Vasudev's operation from Rudra and secretly pays. Next, Rudra misuses him as a killing machine in an underground fight club. Simultaneously, Vasudev recoups his vision when Guru walks to see him, but Gayatri expels him. She knows that Vasudev is the true father of Guru, which she learned from the church father. Following, she divulges the actuality to Vasudev. In tandem, Guru is severely injured when Vasudev and Gayatri rush to the hospital. Here, Vasudev declares himself as his father, which he does not believe, seeks truth, and moves rearward.

Twenty-five years ago, Vasudev, a soldier, knitted Thulasi with a love match, and Gayatri is the daughter of his best friend and colleague. At one time, when they are on duty at the border, Rudra mortifies Gayatri's mother publicly when Thulasi strikes and sentences him. Later, Gayatri's father passes away, and beholding her mother also dies when Vasudev joins Gayatri at an orphanage. The same night, Rudra backstabs Vasudev and attempts to molest Thulasi. As inevitable, Vasudev shoots Thulasi on her necessitate to protect his wife's innocence. Here, tragically, Vasudev loses his vision and Guru his memory, who Rudra abducts. Vasudev must pay a short-term penalty, and after returning, he adopted Gayatri. Listening to it, Guru embraces his father when Rudra pounces on Guru, and he collapses. During that plight, Gayatri removes the wedding chain from his wrestler and orders him to eliminate the evil. At last, Guru blasts and ceases them. Finally, the movie ends on a happy note, with Gayatri asking Guru to tie that wedding chain to her neck.

== Cast ==
- Jagapati Babu as Guru / Bangaram
- Neha Oberoi as Gayatri
- Navya Natarajan as Nimmi
- Kalabhavan Mani as Vasudev
- Ashish Vidyarthi as Rudra
- Kota Srinivasa Rao
- Brahmanandam
- M. S. Narayana
- Raghu Babu as A. K. 47
- Venu Madhav
- Satyam Rajesh
- Kavitha as Doctor
- Sujitha
- Master Priyansh Murarishetty (Bunny) as Junior Guru / Junior Bangaram
- Master Saajan K Charles (Junior Bangaram/Guru)

== Production ==
The muhurat was held on 12 February 2006 at Prasad Labs, Hyderabad.

== Soundtrack ==
Brahmastram

Film score by Vaibhav
- Released: 2006
- Genre: Soundtrack
- Length: 26:27
- Label: Madhura Audio
- Producer: Vaibhav

Music composed by Vaibhav. Lyrics written by Bhaskarbhatla Ravikumar. The audio launch was held on 12 May 2006. The music was released under the Madhura Audio Company label.

No.	Title	Singer(s)	Length
1.	"Adugu Adugu"	Venu, Gayathri	4:15
2.	"Nuvvu Avunantava"	Karthik, Swathi	4:48
3.	"Om Hare Rama"	Andrea	4:05
4.	"Jack & Jill"	Surya Kiran, Sujatha	4:24
5.	"Machilipatnam"	Tippu, Anuradha Sriram	4:42
6.	"Brahmastram"	Vaibhav	4:13
Total length:			26:27
