= Woodstock Villa =

2008 Indian film by Hansal Mehta

- Theatrical release poster
- Directed by: Hansal Mehta
- Written by: Rajiv Krishna; S. Farhan
- Dialogues by: Milap Zaveri
- Based on: Chaos by Hideo Nakata
- Produced by: Sanjay Gupta; Ekta Kapoor; Shobha Kapoor
- Starring: Sikandar Kher; Neha Oberoi; Arbaaz Khan; Gulshan Grover; Sachin Khedekar
- Cinematography: Vikash Nowlakha; Mahesh Aney
- Edited by: Bunty Nagi
- Music by: Anu Malik; Bappi Lahiri
- Distributed by: White Feather Films
- Release date: 30 May 2008
- Running time: 94 minutes
- Country: India
- Language: Hindi
- Budget: ₹380 million
- Box office: ₹200 million

Woodstock Villa is a 2008 Indian Hindi-language neo-noir mystery thriller film directed by Hansal Mehta and jointly produced by Sanjay Gupta and Ekta Kapoor. Loosely based on the 2000 Japanese film Chaos, it stars debutants Sikandar Kher and Neha Oberoi, alongside Arbaaz Khan, Shakti Kapoor, Gulshan Grover and Sachin Khedekar. Sanjay Dutt makes a guest appearance. The film follows an unemployed man who helps a woman plot her own abduction in order to test her husband's love and dedication towards her. The soundtrack was composed by Anu Malik. It was filmed in Mumbai and Mauritius.

The film was released on 30 May 2008, and was a box-office failure. Kher's performance received praise, while the song placement was criticized.

== Plot ==
Zara Kampani meets Sameer in a pub and lands in his flat, asking him to kidnap her so that she can test her husband, Jatin's love. Sameer can't refuse because he is in desperate need of money. He hasn't paid his rent for months and has to return a huge sum of money to a relative.

Zara takes Sameer to Woodstock Villa, the location of the kidnapping. Sameer orders Jatin to hand over 5 million dollars to him. After returning, Sameer discovers Zara is dead. An anonymous caller then threatens that he has only 30 minutes to bury the body and clear up all the evidence. He disposes of her body in a forest and returns.

To be on the safe side, he goes to Bangalore. Sameer sees Zara's video on television and heads back to find the truth. He finds Zara, and he convinces her to tell him the truth. Zara reveals that she and Jatin truly loved each other. Once in a fight, Jatin's real wife, Zara, accidentally died, and as her and Zara's faces were quite similar, she played the role of Zara. The kidnapping plan was hatched by Jatin and his girlfriend to get out of this murder and trap somebody else. Sameer calls Jatin to Woodstock Villa with the money, and he pays his rent and loan.

He goes to the airport while Jatin gets caught by the police. Jatin tells the police that he was not the only one to commit the crime. Sameer gives a bag to Zara, but there is no money inside that bag; he had taken the real bag of money. The ball was in Zara's court. If she boarded the plane, Sameer would have trusted her. She decided to cheat Sameer and got cheated herself. Sameer's flight takes off while Jatin's partner gets arrested.

== Cast ==
- Sikandar Kher as Sameer Shroff
- Neha Oberoi as Zara Kampani / Reshma
- Arbaaz Khan as Jatin Kampani
- Gulshan Grover as Karim Bhai
- Shakti Kapoor as Mr. Amit Chawla, Sameer's landlord
- Sachin Khedekar
- Gaurav Gera as Ajay Verma
- Sanjay Dutt (special appearance in the song "Kyun")
- Aryans (special appearance in the song "Kyun")

== Production ==
Sikander Kher had several expectations from the media for his debut film. Although his family name would provide recognition, he chose to have his only his first name listed on the credits. Sanjay Gupta, the producer of Woodstock Villa, is the uncle of the other newcomer, Neha Oberoi, who found it exciting and challenging to play the role of a kidnapped wife. Gupta offered Mehta the opportunity to direct the film at the point where the latter was out of work.

== Reception ==
Times of India gave the film 3.5 stars out of 5, calling it a stylish thriller and praising the Kher's screen presence, cinematography and songs. On the other hand, Taran Adarsh of Bollywood Hungama gave the film 2 stars out of 5, feeling the film would have left a stronger impact without having any songs, which he stated were like obstances and "unwanted guests". However, he praised Kher along with the subject treatment, screenplay, dialogues, cinematography and background score. Khalid Mohamed of Hindustan Times gave the film 1 star out of 5, terming it a purported noir thriller and a "killer waste" of one's time and physical tolerance.

== Soundtrack ==
- "Dhoka" – Anchal Bhatia
- "Saawan Mein Lag Gayee Aag" – Mika Singh
- "Kyun" – The Aryans, Bappi Lahiri
- "Yeh Pyaar Hai" – Anchal Bhatia, Shaan
- "Koi Chala Ja Raha Hai" – Rahat Fateh Ali Khan
- "Raakh Ho Ja Tu" – Shibani Kashyap
- "Dhoka Dega" – Shibani Kashyap
- "Saawan Mein Lag Gayee Aag" (Club Mix) – Mika Singh
- "Dhoka" (Remix) – Anchal Bhatia
