= Balu (film) =

Balu: ABCDEFG
- Poster
- Directed by: A. Karunakaran
- Written by: A. Karunakaran; Kona Venkat (dialogues)
- Produced by: C. Aswani Dutt
- Starring: Pawan Kalyan; Shriya Saran; Neha Oberoi; Gulshan Grover
- Cinematography: R. Ramesh Babu
- Edited by: Kotagiri Venkateswara Rao
- Music by: Mani Sharma
- Distributed by: Vyjayanthi Movies & KAD Movies
- Release date: 6 January 2005
- Running time: 169 minutes
- Country: India
- Language: Telugu
- Budget: ₹15 crore

Balu: ABCDEFG is a 2005 Indian Telugu-language action comedy film written and directed by A. Karunakaran. The film stars Pawan Kalyan, Shriya, Neha Oberoi and Gulshan Grover. The film was produced by C. Aswini Dutt under his production company Vyjayanthi Movies Its tagline ABCDEFG stands for "A Boy Can Do Everything For Girl." The film released on 6 January 2005 to mixed reviews and was an average grosser at the box office. It was the first Telugu film to have a release in South Africa.

== Plot ==
The story starts with a rowdy Daasanna, the follower of another uncontrollable rowdy, Naayudamma, warning the people of the Mahankali market. At the same time, Balu sets up a new flower stall in the market. He impresses Daasanna by making him believe that he worships Daasanna's mother, thereby getting relieved of the taxes set up by Daasanna. The people of the market get new hopes looking at Balu's style of impressing the rowdies. Balu comes to the city with his mother Rajeswari Devi, sister-in-law, nephew, and friend. As the story goes on, Balu meets Swetha, but both start fighting with each other.

One night, Balu's mother walks to an empty bungalow. She faints there, remembering her past in which her husband Ranga Rao and her son would be killed because they supported the people of Mahankali market in getting the rights on the land. The next day Swetha comes to the hospital to visit Balu's mother and falls in love with Balu. Swetha dares to propose to Balu, but he rejects her love. On the other side, Balu, through Daasanna, tries to steal the documents of the Mahankali market, which are with Nayudamma at that time and are actually to be sold to Khan. Balu makes Nayudamma believe him by saving him from a planned bomb blast. When Khan arrives, he realizes thar Balu is none other than Ghani, who worked under him a few years back.

The flashback unveils the story of Ghani, who changes because of Indu, who, in turn, changes, getting courage from Ghani. Ghani finally moves against Khan, who tries to kill children in an orphanage. Khan decides to kill Ghani and Indu. Ghani and Indu eventually reach Agra, Indu's hometown, where it is revealed that Rajeswari Devi is actually Indu's mother. Indu changes Ghani's name to Balu.

The next day, Balu accepts Indu's love, but at the same time, Khan's rowdies kill Indu. Balu promises Indu that he would take care of her family and fight for people's rights on the Mahankali market. The scene returns to Balu lying in bed as he meets with an accident while driving because of his illness. He gets up and faces Khan, and Khan is finally killed in the fight. Finally, after 20 years, the people of the Mahankali market get the rights on the land.

== Cast ==
- Pawan Kalyan as Ghani / Balraj aka Balu
- Shriya Saran as Swetha
- Neha Oberoi as "Indu" Indira Priyadarsini
- Gulshan Grover as Khan
- Jersey Singh as Nayudamma
- Mahesh Anand as Das
- Saurabh Shukla as Khan's brief
- Brahmanandam as Taj Banjara Hotel Manager
- Jayasudha as Rajeswari Devi
- Sunil as Balu's friend
- Suman as Ranga Rao, Indu's father
- Duvvasi Mohan as Ghani's gang member
- MS Narayana as Landlord
- Tanikella Bharani as Beggar
- Ananth Nag as Baba
- Jeeva as Police Officer
- Dharmavarapu Subramanyam as Pottayya
- Gundu Hanumantha Rao as Store Manager
- Shankar Melkote as VISA Officer
- Naramalli Sivaprasad as Rajan
- Raghunatha Reddy as V. Govardhan Rao
- Master Teja as Cherry
- Baby Kavya as Lilly
- Milind Gunaji in a cameo appearance

== Production ==
In January 2004, during the opening ceremony of Bangaram, Pawan Kalyan mentioned that "Columbus" was the title under consideration for his film with Vyjayanthi Movies. Later it was titled as Balu: ABCDEFG with the tagline ABCDEFG standing for "A Boy Can Do Everything For Girl."

Balu was extensively filmed in Delhi and Agra. A special set was erected near Taj Mahal for the film. A set of Old City, Hyderabad was constructed for the film in Ramoji Film City at a cost of ₹90 lakh. Pawan Kalyan traveled to Italy to buy a unique pant for Balu. Having previously set a trend with double pants in Gudumba Shankar (2004), he spent around ₹2 lakh on the pant, with travel and accommodation costs bringing the total to about ₹5 lakh. Kalyan paid for these expenses himself to avoid burdening the film's producer. These pants later became a trend among the youth.

== Music ==
Balu

Soundtrack album by Mani Sharma
- Released: 25 December 2004 (India)
- Genre: Feature film soundtrack
- Label: Aditya Music
- Producer: Mani Sharma

Mani Sharma chronology
Gudumba Shankar (2004)	Balu (2004)	Radha Gopalam (2005)

The music and background score was composed by Mani Sharma. The soundtrack album consisted of six tracks. The lyrics were written by Sirivennela Sitarama Sastry, Chandrabose, Jonnavittula and Nithin Raijwar.

Track Listing
No.	Title	Lyrics	Singer(s)	Length
1.	"Inthe Inthinthe"	Chandrabose	KK	5:21
2.	"Neelo Jarige"	Sirivennela Seetharama Sastry	Hariharan, Shreya Ghoshal	6:00
3.	"Kannu Kottina"	Sirivennela Seetharama Sastry	Udit Narayan, Sujatha	4:40
4.	"Hut Hutja"	Nithin Raikwar	Kunal Ganjawala	4:08
5.	"Athi Methani"	Chandrabose	Ranjith, Mahalaxmi Iyer	5:21
6.	"Lokale Gelavaga"	Jonnavittula Ramalingeswara Rao	K. S. Chithra, Murali	4:36

== Reception ==
Jeevi of Idlebrain wrote, "On the whole, Balu sums up to be a film you should watch to see Pawan Kalyan in a fresh radiant look". A critic from Full Hyderabad stated, "On the whole, passable fare, worth a visit". Independent Online of South Africa reviewed the film noting, "While Balu ABCDEFG is given the routine treatment, in that the tale includes the usual dose of humour, action and romance, the directing is deft and the performance of the lead actors excellent." A critic from Sify opined "Pawan Kalyan and his remote controlled director Karunakaran has cooked up an unimaginative script etched from various films including the famous Basha formula to churn out something that is not edible". Rakesh P from Deccan Herald wrote "While the first half of the film is very light, the second half is loaded with serious stuff that can give you a headache if you are not the kind who likes action stuff".

== See also ==
Panjaa, a 2011 Telugu-language film directed by Vishnuvardhan, which also stars Pawan Kalyan in the lead role, is also based on the same plot, similar to Balu.
