= Sanjay Gupta (director) =

Indian filmmaker (1967–2026)

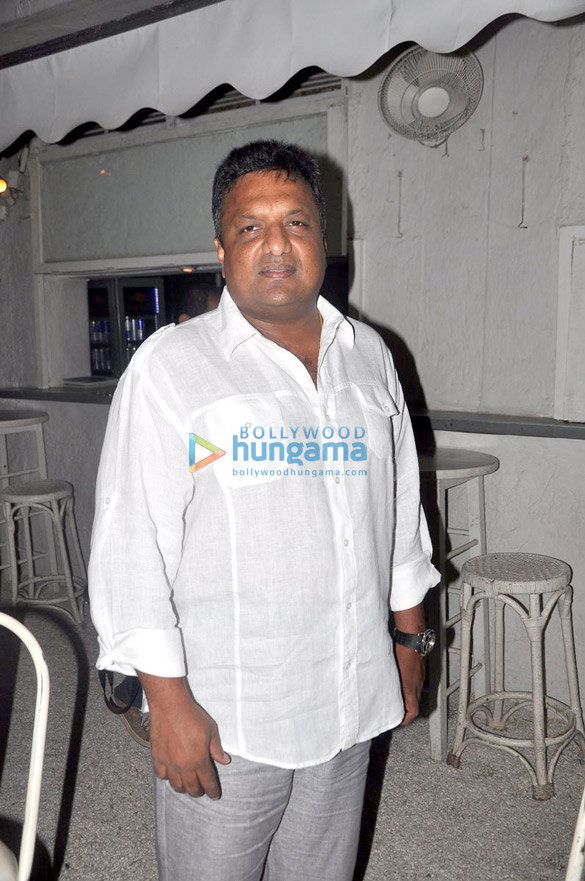
- Gupta at the launch of Priyanka Sinha Jha's book Supertraits of Superstars, 2024
- Born: 14 April 1967; Mumbai, Maharashtra, India
- Died: 30 October 2026 (aged 59); Mumbai, Maharashtra, India
- Occupations: Director, producer, screenwriter
- Years active: 1994–2026
- Spouse: Anuradha Lekhi
- Children: 2

Sanjay Gupta (14 April 1967 – 30 October 2026) was an Indian filmmaker, producer, and screenwriter who worked in Hindi films. Gupta was mostly known for his remakes of American action-thriller and crime films, including films such as Aatish, Kaante, Kaabil, Shootout at Lokhandwala, Shootout at Wadala, Jazbaa, Karam, Zinda and Mumbai Saga. He used to frequently cast Sanjay Dutt and Aditya Pancholi in his films.

== Film career ==
Gupta started his career with Aatish (1994) starring Aditya Pancholi and Sanjay Dutt. Later he went on to write and direct films including Ram Shastra, Khauff and Jung. The filming of Jung (2000) lasted over two years. While filming Kaante in Los Angeles in 2001, the events of the 9/11 attack forced filming to relocate planned scenes from several areas that were then considered sensitive. Commentators noted a similarity in Kaante to Quentin Tarantino's film Reservoir Dogs. Gupta said that he was inspired by a number of other films as well, including The Asphalt Jungle, The Killing, and the film that inspired Reservoir Dogs, Ringo Lam's City on Fire. Further, responding to allegations of plagiarism, he went on to state that he would "beg, borrow and steal from any medium, be it films, newspapers, magazines, novels, reality, fiction, to make an interesting story."

Gupta's Zinda (2006) has been described as an unofficial remake of the South Korean film Oldboy.

He also produced the films Shootout at Lokhandwala (2007) and Dus Kahaniyaan, and directed and co-produced Shootout at Wadala, the prequel to Shootout at Lokhandwala.

On 24 December 2019, he made an announcement on the acquisition of Yali Dream Creations' Rakshak. Gupta took to Twitter to share details about the project which revolves around a "vigilante" superhero. "So proud and happy to announce that my company White Feather Films has acquired the rights for 'RAKSHAK' A thrilling graphic novel about a vigilante superhero. This is India's first graphic novel to be made into a massive and ambitious feature film to be directed by me," the director wrote alongside the covers of the four issues to the comics. He said he would be producing it under his company, White Feather Entertainment, along with co-producers, Asvin Srivatsangam and Vivek Rangachari from Yali Dream Works.

== Death ==
Gupta died in Mumbai on 30 October 2026, at the age of 57, after slipping in his kitchen and hitting his head on the kitchen countertop.

== Filmography ==
Year	Film	Director	Producer	Writer	Note
1994	Aatish	Yes		Yes	Inspired by Deewaar, A Better Tomorrow, and State of Grace
1995	Ram Shastra	Yes		Yes	Based on Hard to Kill
1997	Hameshaa	Yes		Yes	
2000	Jung	Yes		Yes	Based on Desperate Measures
2000	Khauff	Yes		Yes	Based on The Juror
2002	Kaante	Yes		Yes	Inspired by City On Fire and Reservoir Dogs Nominated - Filmfare Award for Best Director
2004	Plan		Yes	Yes	Based on Suicide Kings
2004	Musafir	Yes		Yes	Based on U Turn
2006	Zinda	Yes		Yes	Based on Oldboy
2007	Shootout at Lokhandwala		Yes		
2007	Dus Kahaniyaan	Yes	Yes		Inspired by The Ten and Tales from the Crypt
2008	Woodstock Villa		Yes		Based on Japanese movie Chaos
2009	Acid Factory		Yes		Based on Unknown
2010	Pankh		Yes		
2013	Shootout at Wadala	Yes	Yes	Yes	Based on the book Dongri to Dubai
2015	Jazbaa	Yes	Yes	Yes	Based on Seven Days
2017	Kaabil	Yes			Inspired by Blind Fury and Broken
2021	Mumbai Saga	Yes	Yes		
2024	Visfot		Yes		Official adaptation of 2012 Venezuelan film Rock, Paper, Scissors
2024	The Miranda Brothers	Yes	Yes	Yes	
