= Visfot =

2024 Indian film by Kookie Gulati

- Official release poster
- Directed by: Kookie Gulati
- Written by: Abbas Dalal; Hussain Dalal
- Based on: Rock, Paper, Scissors by Hernán Jabes
- Produced by: Sanjay Gupta; Anuradha Gupta
- Starring: Fardeen Khan; Riteish Deshmukh; Anukreethy Vas; Priya Bapat; Krystle D'Souza
- Cinematography: Shikhar Bhatnagar
- Edited by: Manish More
- Music by: Song: Amjad Nadeem Aamir; Background Score: Amar Mohile
- Production company: White Feather Films
- Distributed by: JioCinema
- Release date: 6 September 2024
- Running time: 130 minutes
- Country: India
- Language: Hindi

Visfot (transl. Explosion) is a 2024 Indian Hindi-language crime thriller film written by Abbas Dalal and Hussain Dalal and directed by Kookie Gulati and produced by Sanjay Gupta and Anuradha Gupta under the banner of White Feather Films. The film stars Riteish Deshmukh and Fardeen Khan with Priya Bapat and Krystle D'Souza in supporting roles.

It was released on 6 September 2024 on JioCinema.

== Plot ==
Shoaib, a taxi driver, is living with his aged mother, who has a medical condition that makes her forget many things, from time to time, trivial and non-trivial, including the fact that her own husband (Shoaib's father) has died. Though he is not actually friends with, he is acquainted with a local gangster called Manya who knows Shoaib and his mother well.

Manya, who works under a notorious woman-gangster known as "Acid Tai" due to her propensity to use acid as a weapon against anyone including the innocent, as needed.

One night Manya has a chat with Shoaib in his taxi and leaves a jacket with him. Shoaib keeps the jacket at his home and goes to meet his girlfriend Lucky, a waitress at the Bombay Coffee House. Shoaib is rudely woken up with a call saying that a fire broke out at his home. He rushes home and saves his mother. His mother cries in his arms saying that she accidentally caused the fire in her kitchen.

Later, he gets a call from Manya and is jolted when Manya wants his jacket back, because he can no longer find it. He would later learn from Manya, to his shock and horror that the jacket contained drugs worth Rs. 20 Lakhs. He checks everywhere but could not find it and panic sets in. The fire accident only made things worse.

Manya threatens him to return him the jacket at any cost, failing which would kill his mother. He also fears for the life of his girlfriend now. He picks up Lucky from her Café and during the ride, discovers an eight-year-old boy with her. Lucky hesitatingly informs him that a customer named Aakash had left him until he returns.

Meanwhile another side story happening in parallel is revealed. Akash, a pilot, lives with his wife Tara and son Parth. One day while dropping his son to school, he discovers his wife with another man and starts following her. She, along with her presumed boyfriend, checks into The Plaza hotel. Akash, who is in his own panic mode, having seen an illicit affair by his wife with his own eyes, leaves his son with Lucky, the waitress at the cafe and begs her to take care of him for an unspecified amount of time and rushes to the hotel to catch her red-handed. He breaks into her room, and they have a verbal argument. Tara informs him that it is over between them and she is going to marry Javed, the man she is with in the hotel. Dejected and angry, he returns to Bombay Coffee House and learns that Lucky along with his son is missing. Aakash and Tara, assume that she has kidnapped their son.

Meanwhile, Manya and "Acid Tai" start threatening that they would kill Lucky and Shoaib's mother. Shoaib, in a moment of desperation, tries to save them by showing Parth whose rich parent can be asked to the pay some ransom. His hope is that he has compensated them for the loss of jacket. But "Acid Tai" and gang make Shoaib make a ransom phone call Rs 2 crores from the boy's parents. Though Shoaib finds it repulsive to ask for such a big amount, he is now inadvertently part of a kidnap plot in-progress.

The story takes dramatic twists and turns where the jacket is eventually found, but even after it was returned, the evil gang refuses to call off the ransom demand and return the kid to safety. Officer Waghmare, who was assigned to help Aakash and Tara also ends up being corrupt and is making his own personal side-plot to take the cash.

In the climax, Akash is asked to go to the carnival, a very crowded place with multiple rides and thousands of people, where he is supposed to drop off the duffel bag of cash. Three different gangs are looking to capture the loot, namely, the same bag of cash, not even knowing which gang is fighting whom. Multiple phone calls happen between multiple parties involved in the sinister plot. Akash is redirected to multiple spots in the crowded carnival, multiple confusing verbal directions eventually end up in a big gunfight in which gangs are killed by one another. In a dramatic finale, Akash tearfully believes that his son was also killed by Waghmare, in spite of him handing over the cash and in a blind rage, picks up a gun nearby and kills the last remaining bad guy, Waghmare. The story ends on a good note where the tearful dad is reunited with his son by Shoaib who kept him safe throughout the gun fight.

== Cast ==
- Riteish Deshmukh as Akash Shelar, a pilot
- Fardeen Khan as Shoaib Khan, a taxi-driver
- Priya Bapat as Tara Shelar, Akash's wife
- Krystle D'Souza as Lucky, Shoaib's love interest
- Sheeba Chaddha as Roshan Kalima Khan, Shoaib's mother
- Seema Biswas as Acid Tai
- Ayaz Khan as Sagar, Tara's brother
- Neha Pednekar as Shreya, Sagar's wife
- Arjun Aneja as Javed Khan, Tara's love interest
- Nachiket Purnapatre as Manya, Acid Tai's gang worker
- Vivaan Parashar as Altaf, Acid Tai's gang worker
- Purnendu Bhattacharya as Fernandes
- Satyajeet Kadam as Waghmare
- Tejas Gaikwad as Peter, Acid Tai's gang worker
- Saransh Taneja as Cyrus, Bombay coffee house owner
- Prithviraj Sarnaik as Parth Shelar, Akash and Tara's son
- Raj Shekhar Chandran as Bala
- Abhijit Ghadge as Ravi
- Arhan Khan as Mehmood, Shoaib's friend
- Satyajeet Kadam as Waghmare

== Production ==
=== Casting ===
In November 2021, Krystle D'Souza was confirmed to be a part of the cast, in a pivotal role.

=== Development ===
The film was announced in September 2021, an remake of the 2012 Venezuelan film Rock, Paper, Scissors, starring Fardeen Khan and Riteish Deshmukh.

=== Filming ===
The makers of the film arranged a Muhurat puja for the team a week ahead of filming. The principal photography of the film started in mid-October 2021 in Mumbai. The climax of the film was shot in November 2021 in the suburbs of Mumbai.

Priya Bapat announced that she had completed filming her part in the film. Actor Fardeen Khan and Riteish Deshmukh announced the wrap-up of the film on 23 February 2022.

== Release ==
In December 2022, it was announced that the film was heading for a streaming release on an OTT platform in 2023. It premiered on JioCinema on 6 September 2024.

== Reception ==
Visfot received positive reviews from audiences.

Shubhra Gupta of The Indian Express gave 1.5 stars out of 5 and said that "The execution of this film sticks to the over-familiar lane populated by smart-talking goons, mothers doused in misery, overwrought wives and girl-friends, corrupt cops, ransom calls and shoot-outs." A critic from Bollywood Hungama gave 2.5 out of 5 stars and wrote "Visfot has its share of engaging and tense moments and some fine performances. However, there are too many loose ends in the first half, so the film turns out to be an average entertainer." Rishabh Suri of Hindustan Times stated in his review that "Kookie Gulati's drama, ends up as a whimper instead of a banging time at the movies." Archika Khurana of The Times of India rated 2.5 stars out of 5 and said "Visfot struggles with uneven pacing and a diluted climax, its strong performances and chaotic, tension-filled narrative offer enough thrills to keep viewers engaged. With tighter execution, it could have been a more unforgettable experience." Devesh Sharma of Filmfare gave 3.5 stars out of 5 and stated that "Visfot is a crime drama with an emotional core. The engaging story is marred by faulty execution."
