= Rock, Paper, Scissors (2012 film) =

2012 film

- Film poster
- Spanish: Piedra, papel o tijera
- Directed by: Hernán Jabes
- Written by: Irina Dendiouk; Hernán Jabes
- Starring: Gloria Montoya
- Cinematography: Daniel Garcia
- Release date: 22 June 2012
- Country: Venezuela
- Language: Spanish

Rock, Paper, Scissors (Spanish: Piedra, papel o tijera) is a 2012 Venezuelan thriller drama film directed by Hernán Jabes. The film was selected as the Venezuelan entry for the Best Foreign Language Oscar at the 85th Academy Awards, but it did not make it into the final shortlist. A Hindi remake, Visfot, was released in 2024, starring Ritesh Deshmukh and Fardeen Khan.

== Plot ==
Christian kidnaps Hector's son by mistake, unleashing a chain of delicate events that will be tragic for everyone involved.

== Cast ==
- Gloria Montoya as Mariana
- Leonidas Urbina as Hector
- Leandro Arvelo as Cristhian
- Alberto Alifa as detective Gonzalo
- Julio Cesar Castro As Dimas
- Jose Roberto Diaz as David
- Scarlett Jaimes as Valentina
- Ernesto Campos as Mario

== See also ==
- List of submissions to the 85th Academy Awards for Best Foreign Language Film
- List of Venezuelan submissions for the Academy Award for Best Foreign Language Film
