= Nilgiri Mountain Railway =

Heritage rail line in India

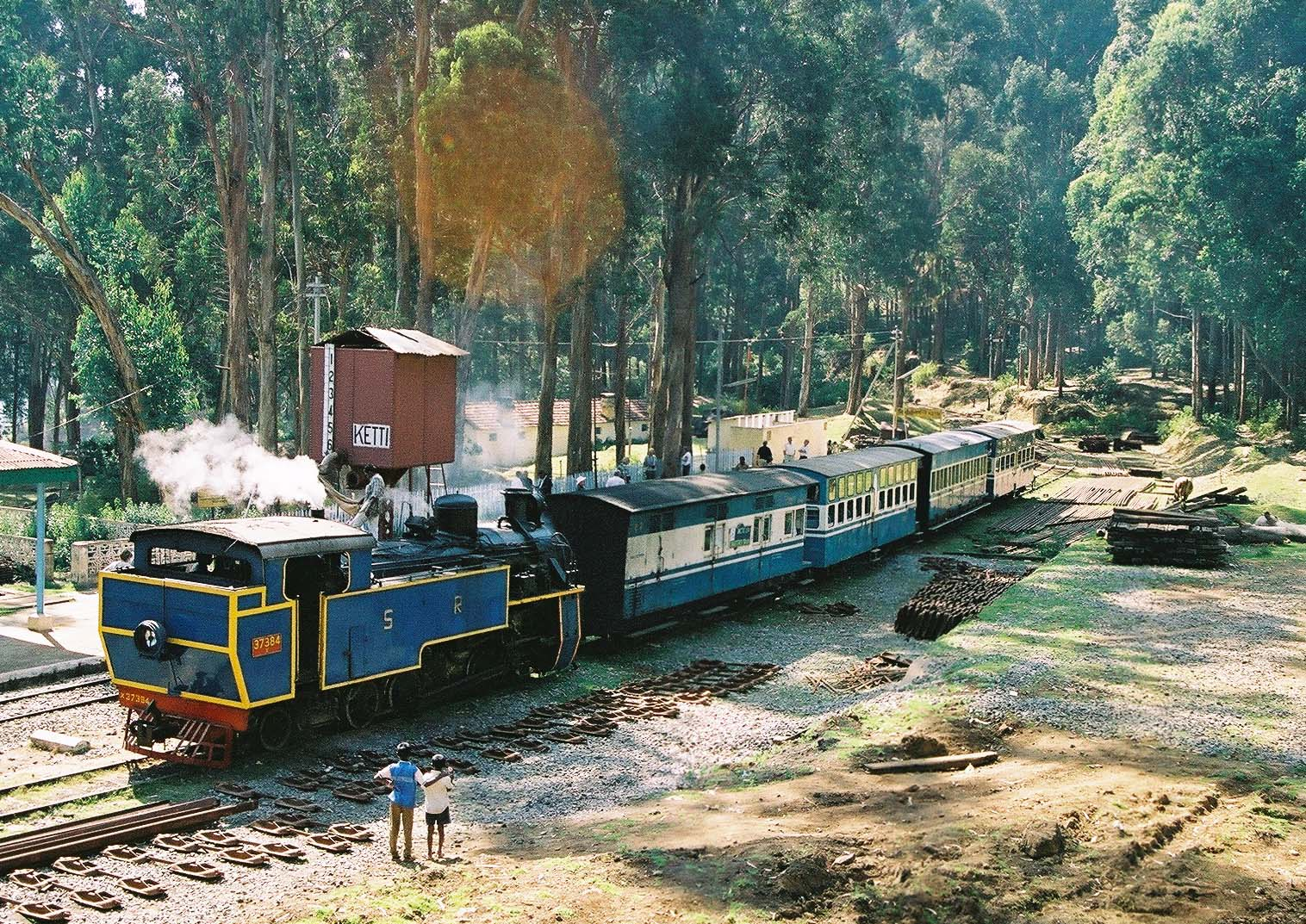
- NMR at Ketti station
- Terminus: Udhagamandalam

Preserved operations
- Owned by: Southern Railway Zone
- Operated by: Salem railway division
- Stations: 13
- Length: 46 km (29 mi)
- Preserved gauge: 1,000 mm (3 ft 3 3/8 in)
- Preserved rack system: Abt

Commercial history
- Opened: 1908

Preservation history
- Headquarters: Mettupalayam
- Location within India

UNESCO World Heritage Site
- Part of: Mountain Railways of India
- Criteria: Cultural: (ii)(iv)
- Reference: 944ter-002
- Inscription: 1999 (23rd Session)
- Extensions: 2005, 2008
- Area: 4.59 ha (11.3 acres)
- Buffer zone: 500 ha (1,200 acres)
- Coordinates: 11°30′37″N 76°55′54″E

The Nilgiri Mountain Railway (NMR), colloquially called the "Toy Train" by locals, is a 1,000 mm (3 ft 3 3/8 in) metre gauge railway in Nilgiris district, Tamil Nadu, India, built by the British in 1908. The railway is operated by the Southern Railway and is the only rack railway in India.

The railway relies on its fleet of steam locomotives. NMR switched to diesel locomotives on the section between Mettupalyam and Udhagamandalam. Local people and visitors led a campaign to return to steam locomotives in this section.

In July 2005, UNESCO added the Nilgiri Mountain Railway as an extension to the World Heritage Site of Darjeeling Himalayan Railway. The site then became known as Mountain Railways of India.

== History ==
In 1854, plans were made to build a mountain railway from Mettupalayam to the Nilgiri Hills. However, it took the decision-makers 45 years to cut through the bureaucratic red tape and complete the construction. The line was completed and opened for traffic in June 1899. It was operated first by the Madras Railway under an agreement with the government.

The Madras Railway Company continued to manage the railway line on behalf of the government for a long time until the South Indian Railway company purchased it.

In 1907, the railway received four Double Fairlie locomotives to work the line. These were part of a batch built by the Avonside Engine Company in 1879 and 1880 for service in Afghanistan, but had been in store since 1887. The Fairlies continued in use until at least 1914.

In September 1908, the line was extended to Fernhill. By 15 October 1908, it was extended to Udagmandalam. These extensions from Coonoor on the same gauge over a distance of 11 3/4 miles (18.91 km) were done at a cost of ₹ 2,440,000.

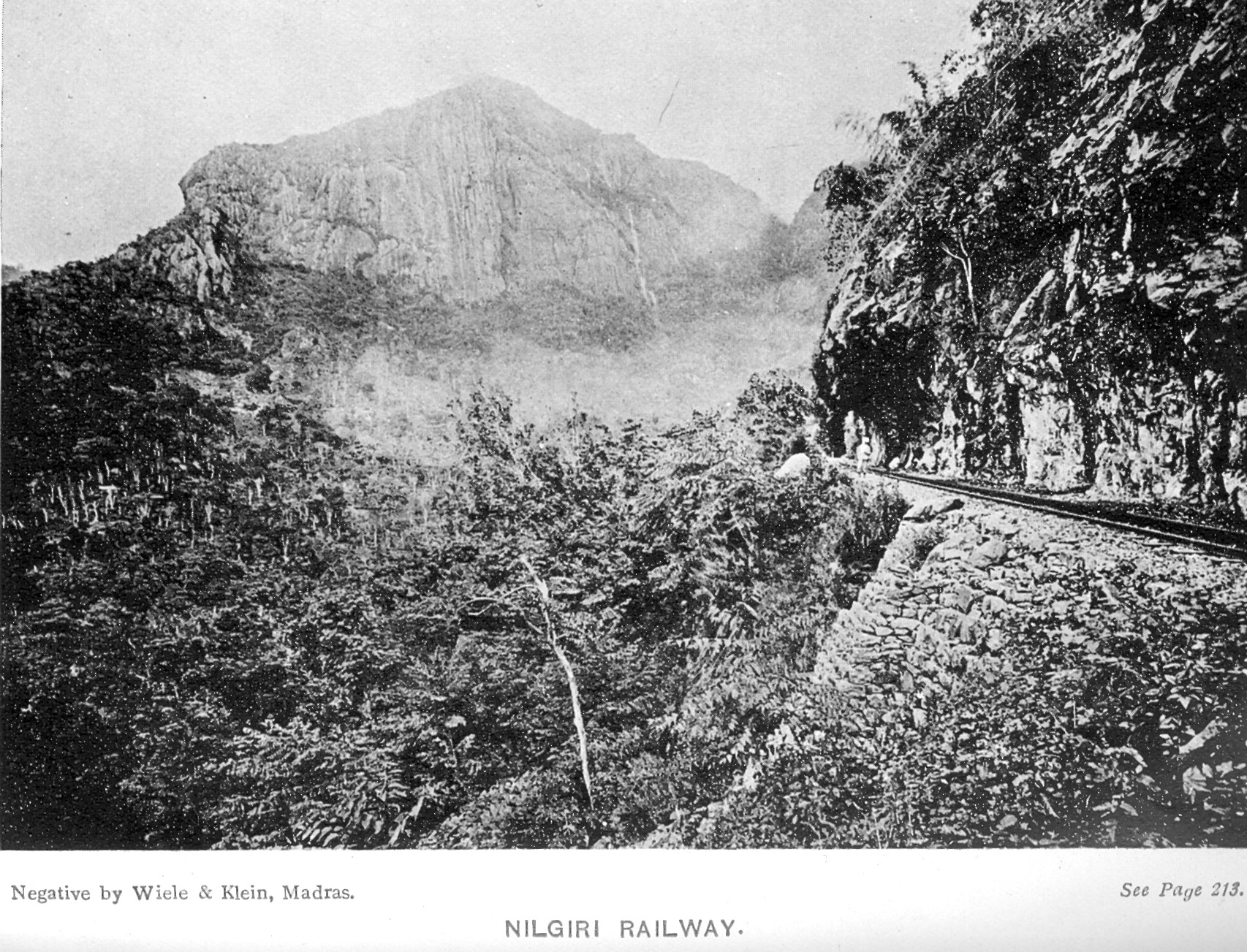
A curve on NMR

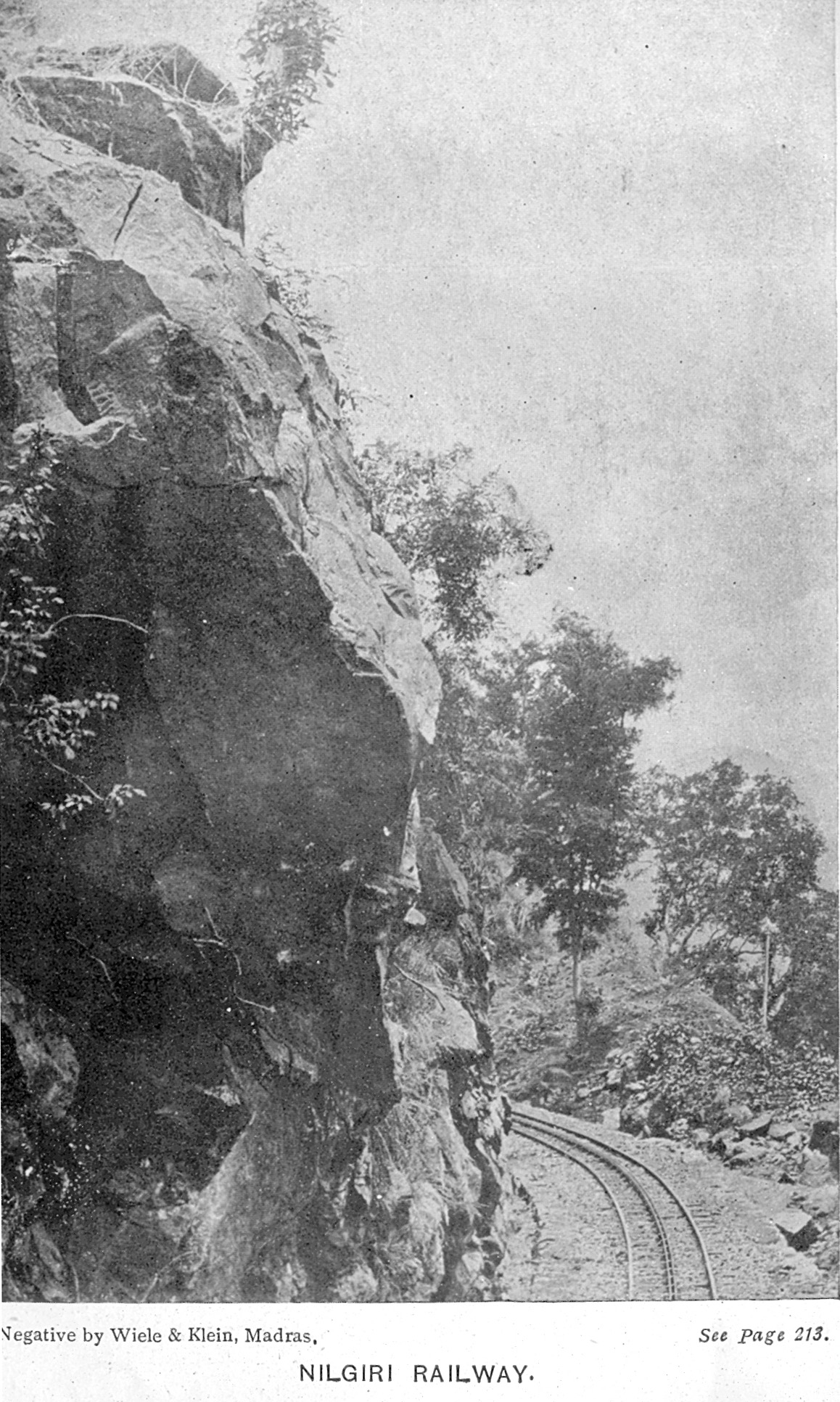
A curve on NMR

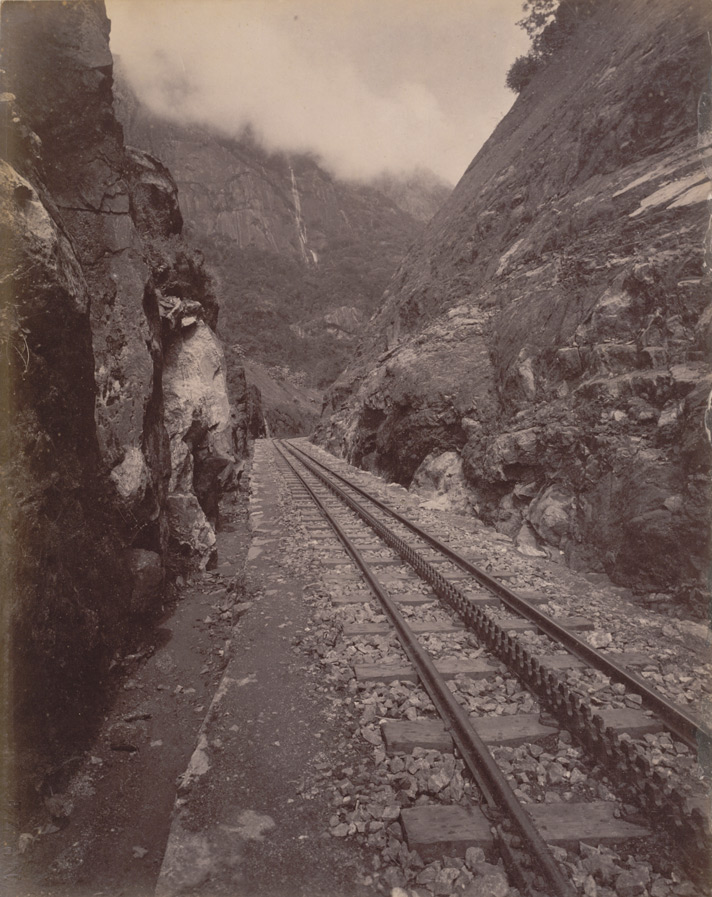
NMR line showing rails and rack in 1900

== Operators ==
The NMR and all of its assets, including the stations, the line, and the track vehicles, belong to the Government of India and are managed by the Ministry of Railways. The Southern Railway performs the day-to-day maintenance and management, but several programs, divisions and departments of the Indian Railways are responsible for operating, maintaining and repairing the NMR.

== Rack and pinion ==
Between Kallar and Coonoor, the line uses the Abt rack and pinion system to climb the steep gradient. The NMR is the only rack railway in India.

Functioning of the rack and pinion

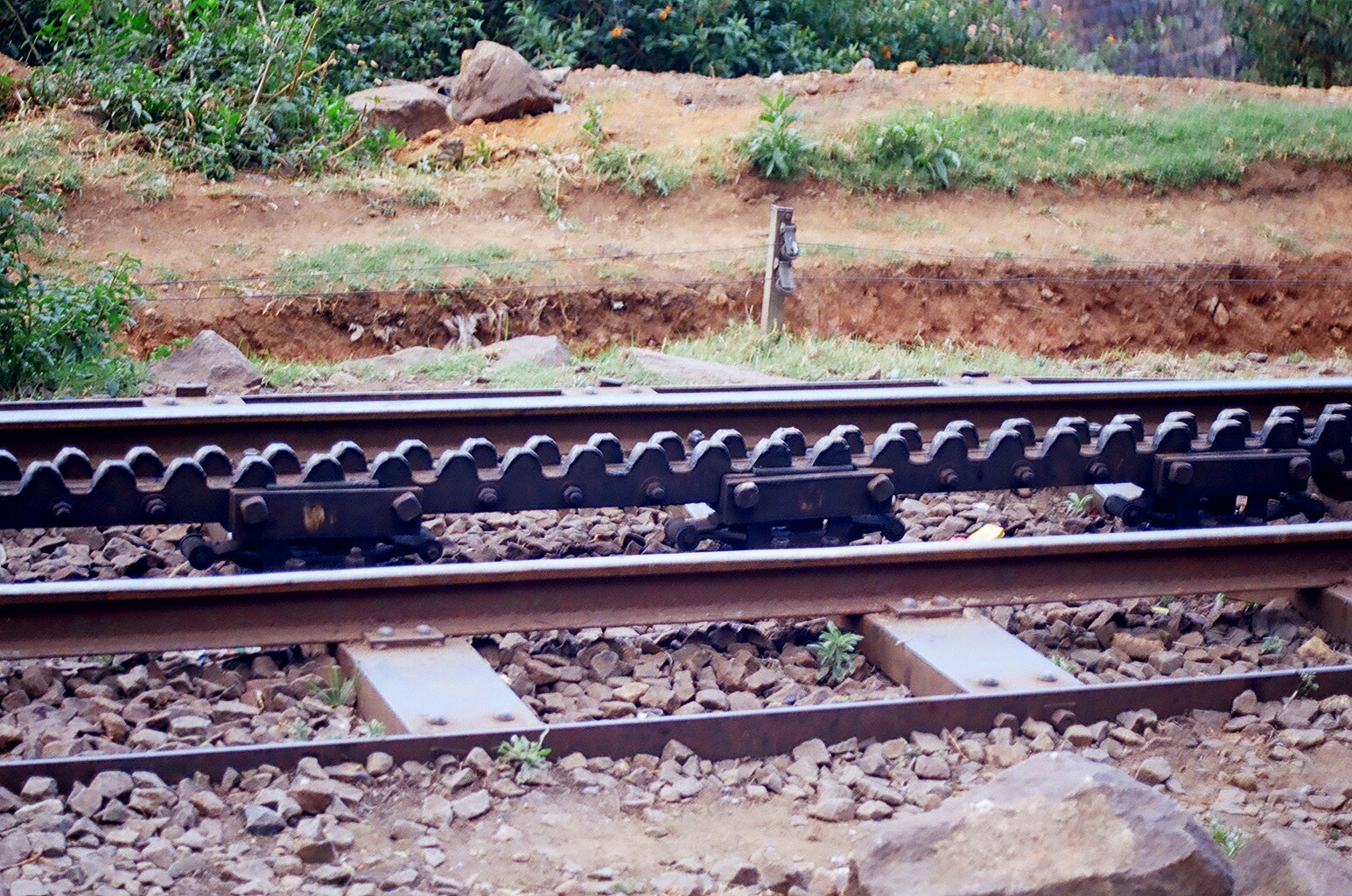
Rack seen between the two rail tracks

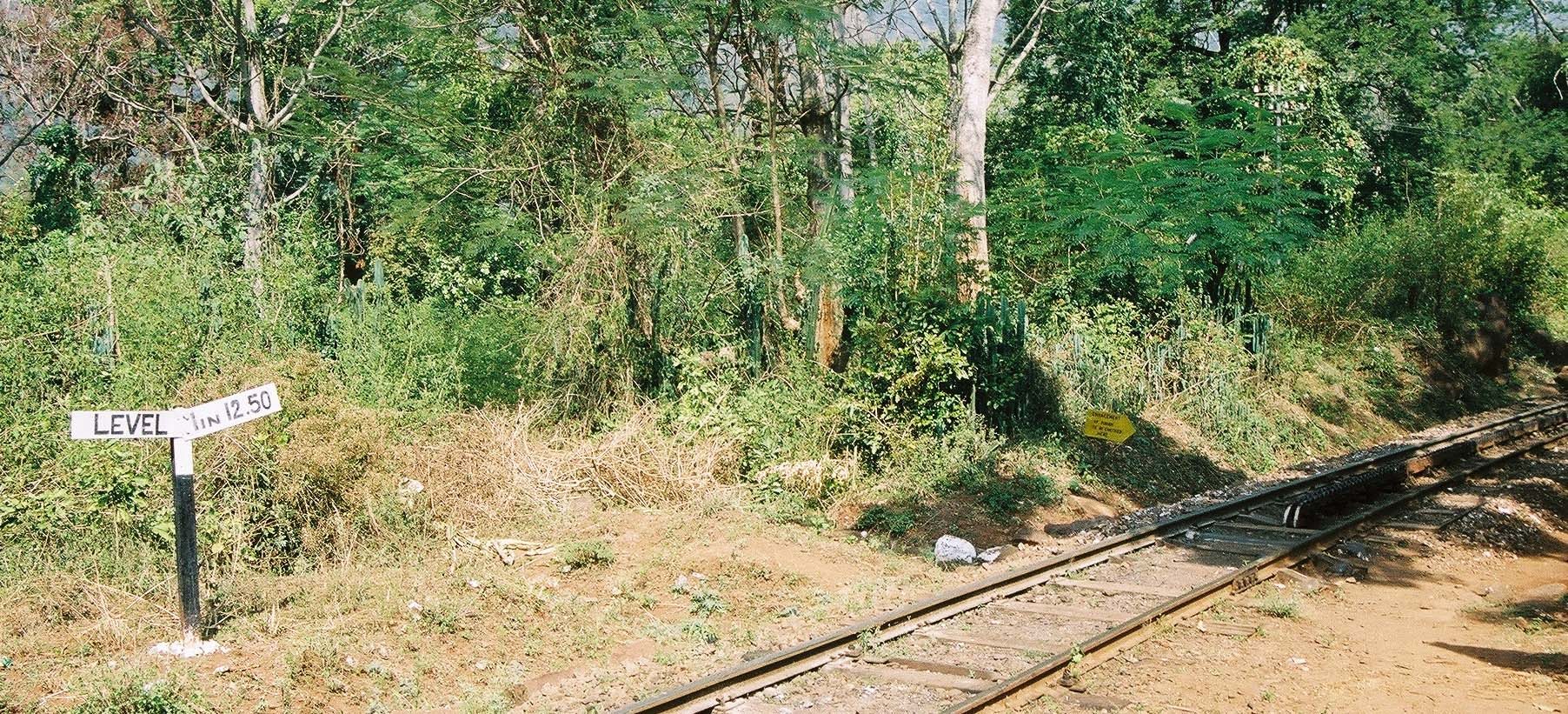
Start of the rack after Kallar

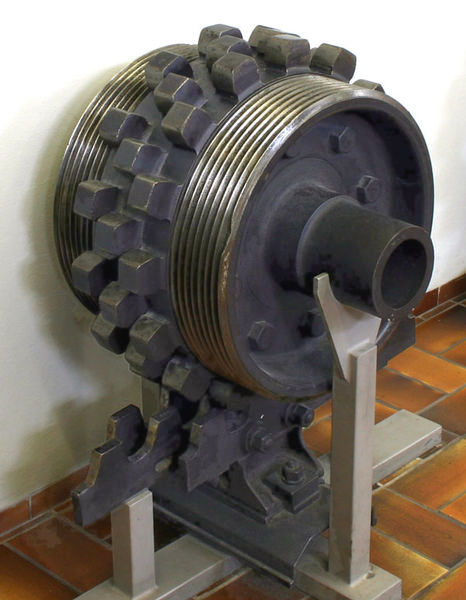
Abt rack system

== Rolling stock ==
Rolling stock

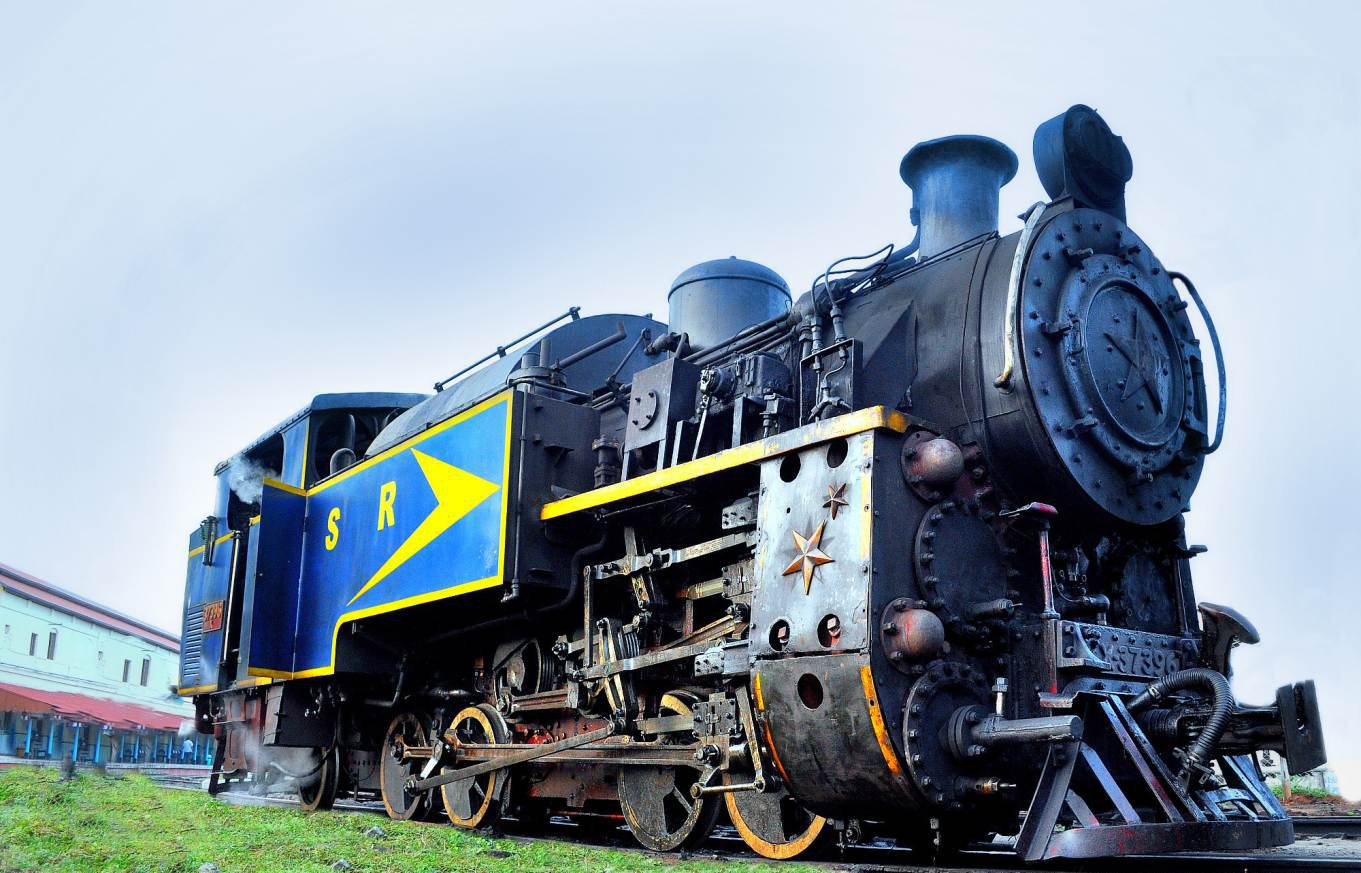
An X Class steam locomotive

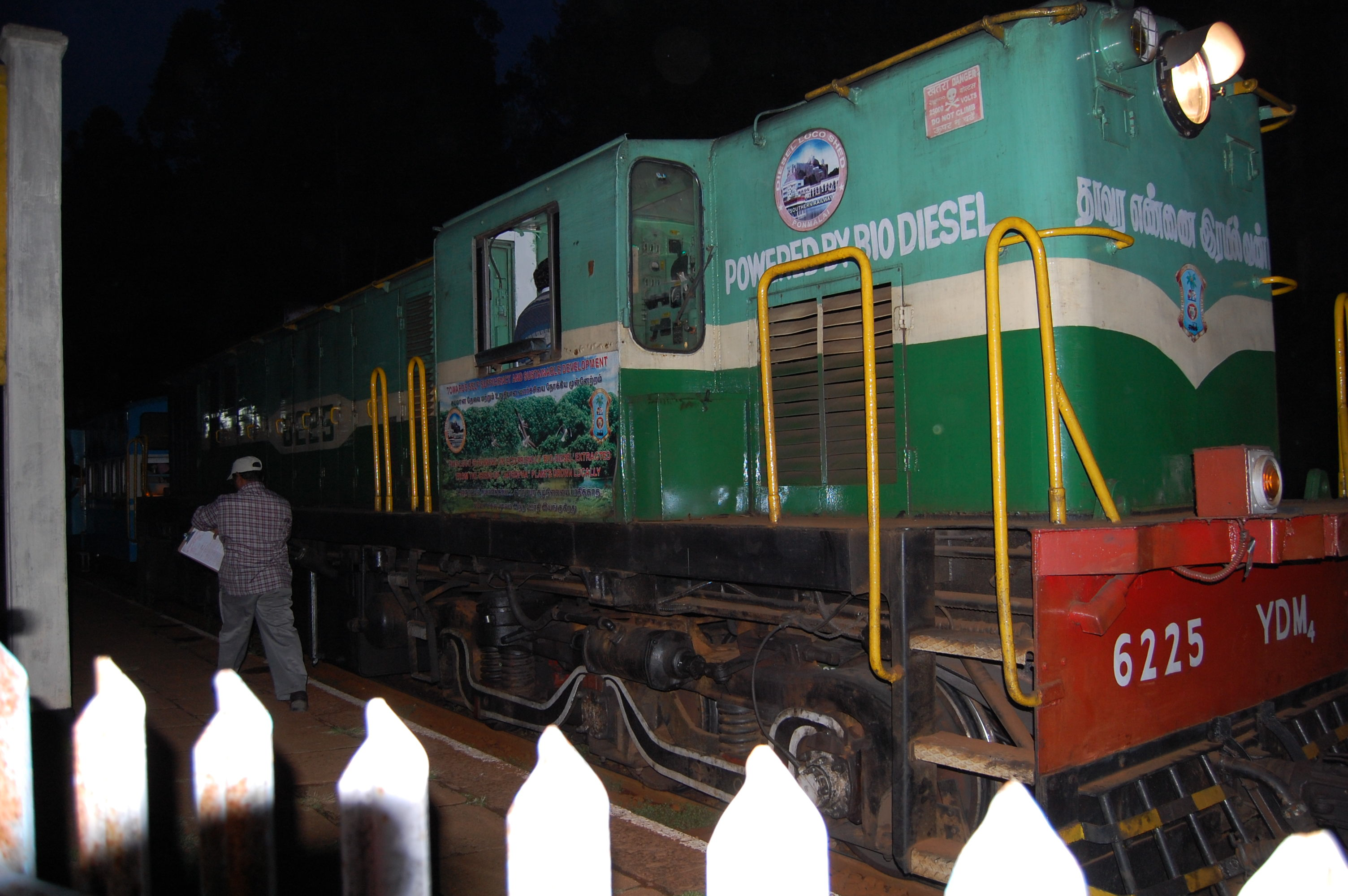
A YDM 4 Biodiesel locomotive

NMR uses 'X' Class steam rack locomotives, most manufactured by the Swiss Locomotive and Machine Works of Winterthur in Switzerland, on the rack and pinion section of its tracks. The X Class locomotives are up to eight decades old, but the newest was completed August 2021 at the Golden Rock Railway Workshops in India. These locomotives give NMR a distinct charm, taking scores of passengers to Coonoor and Udhagamandalam, crossing 45.8 kilometres (28 mi), 209 curves, 16 tunnels and 250 bridges.

The steam locomotives can be used on any part of the line, while the diesel locomotives can operate only on the section between Coonoor and Udagamandalam.

Each diesel engine weighs a little over 50 tonnes and cost Rs. 100,000,000. They have pilot and primary burners. Separate tanks hold about 850 litres (190 imp gal; 220 US gal) of diesel and 2,250 litres (490 imp gal; 590 US gal) of furnace oil. The hauling capacity of this new engine is 97.6 tonnes (96.1 long tons; 107.6 short tons). It can run at a speed of 30 kilometres per hour (19 miles per hour) on plains and at 15 kilometres per hour (9.3 miles per hour) climbing a gradient. The arrival of the new engines eliminated the disruptions in service that occurred frequently.

The steam locomotives are marshalled at the downhill (Mettupalayam) end of the train. The average gradient in this rack section is 1 in 24.5 (4.08%), with a maximum of 1 in 12 (8.33%).

Southern Railway carries out the majority of the locomotive repairs at the Coonoor shed but has rebuilt many of the steam locomotives at the Golden Rock Railway Workshops. Many carriage repairs take place at Mettupalayam. Like the locomotives, major work on the carriages takes place at one of the larger railway workshops.

== Route ==
The uphill journey takes around 290 minutes (4.8 hours), and the downhill journey takes 215 minutes (3.6 hours). It has the steepest track in Asia with a maximum gradient of 8.33%. As of 2007, a daily train crosses the rack section, which starts from Mettupalayam at 07:10 and reaches Udhagamandalam at noon. The return train starts from Udhagamandalam at 14:00, and reaches Mettupalayam at 17:35. The train is scheduled to connect to the Nilgiri Express, which travels from Mettupalayam to Chennai via Coimbatore. A summer special service runs in April and May, starting from Mettupalayam at 09:30 am and from Udhagamandalam at 12:15 pm. Between Coonoor and Udagamandalam, four daily trains run each way.

Even though the NMR supplies networked computerized ticketing systems for onward journeys, it still issues Edmondson style manual tickets for the Udhagamandalam-Mettupalayam journey to preserve its 'World Heritage Site' status. Ticket booking is similar to conventional trains and can be done via the Indian Railway website. It is advisable to book tickets well in advance, especially during peak season.

=== Stations ===
- Mettupalayam (MTP) has the 5 ft 6 in (1,676 mm) line near to Coimbatore Junction. Passengers cross the platform to board the NMR. A small locomotive shed is there and the carriage workshops for the line. Leaving Mettupalayam, the line is adhesion-worked and actually drops for a short distance before crossing the Bhavani River, after which it starts to climb gently.
- Kallar (QLR) is closed as a passenger station, although it is where the rack rail begins. As the train leaves the station, the gradient is 1 in 12 (8.33%).
- Adderly (ADY) is used only as a water stop.
- Hillgrove (HLG) is a block post and water stop with passenger refreshments.
- Runneymede (RME) is used only as a water stop.
- Kateri Road (KXR): trains no longer stop there. Proposed Plan to Convert to a Historical Railway Tourist Hub,
- Coonoor (ONR) is the main intermediate station, sited near the locomotive workshops as well as the top end of the rack rail.
- Wellington (WEL)
- Aravankadu (AVK)
- Ketti (KXT)
- Lovedale (LOV): From a short distance before Lovedale, the line descends into Udhagamandalam.
- Fern Hill (FER): From a short distance after Lovedale, the line descends into Udhagamandalam, Now used as Railway officer Tourist Rest House.
- Udhagamandalam (UAM) (with an old code of Ootacamund OND) has preserved much of its equipment from the Raj. In addition to the original 1908 building, it operates a water dispenser for steam locomotives, and a weighing scale made in 1907 by Hendry Boomley & Son of Birmingham.

== See also ==
- Nilgiri Express
