= Black Bridge (The Nilgiris) =

Coordinates: 11.3613659°N 76.7785289°E

The Black Bridge (now the Manekshaw Bridge) is a historic bridge in Wellington, The Nilgiris District, India. At 43.5 metres long, the bridge spans across the Mynala stream, which joins the Coonoor River 2 kilometres downstream. The bridge connects Wellington Cantonment to the Ooty - Coonoor road (NH181). The bridge was constructed in 1858, but it collapsed before its completion. The bridge was constructed again in 1878 using wooden structures. It was named the Waterloo Bridge, as the beginning of the Waterloo Road, which leads up to present-day Madras Regimental Centre. The bridge has locally been known as Black Bridge ever since, as the bridge was built of Burmese teak and was coated with black tar. In 2009, after the most recent reconstruction, the bridge is named "Manekshaw Bridge" in honour of the Late Field Marshal SHFJ Manekshaw, who had made Coonoor his final resting place. The bridge now sports a statue of the late Field Marshal at the confluence with NH 181.

== Refurbishing ==
The bridge was declared to be unsafe in the 1950s. The wooden decking of the bridge was replaced by a concrete counterpart in 1963. The bridge was deemed unsafe again in 2005, after which it was demolished completely and rebuilt.

== See also ==
- Ooty Market
- Ooty bus stand
- Charring cross
