= Lovedale railway station =

Railway station in Tamil Nadu, India

Lovedale

General information
- Location: India
- Coordinates: 11.3829°N 76.7047°E
- Elevation: 2,211 metres (7,254 ft)
- System: Light rail
- Owner: Indian Railways
- Operator: Southern Railway zone
- Line: Nilgiri Mountain Railway
- Platforms: 2
- Connections: Bus

Construction
- Structure type: At-grade
- Parking: Yes
- Cycle facilities: Yes

Other information
- Station code: LOV
- Fare zone: Indian Railways

History
- Opened: 1908; 118 years ago
Location
- Location within India Location within Tamil Nadu

Lovedale railway station (station code: LOV) is an NSG–6 category Indian railway station in Salem railway division of Southern Railway zone. It is a railway station serving Lovedale, a town located south of Udhagamandalam (Ooty), in the Nilgiris district of Tamil Nadu. A notable tourist attraction, it is one of the stations of the Nilgiri Mountain Railway, built in 1907, and is a UNESCO declared World Heritage Site. It is one of the halts for the historic Ooty passenger. It is maintained and administered by the Southern Railway zone and comes under the Salem railway division. The station code is: LOV.
