= Melur (disambiguation) =

Melur is a town and municipality in Madurai, Tamil Nadu, India.

Melur may also refer to the following places in India:

- Melur Assembly constituency, electoral constituency of the Tamil Nadu Legislative Assembly covering the town
- Melur, Kallakurichi, a village in Tamil Nadu
- Melur, Karnataka or Meluru, a village in Chikkaballapur district
- Melur, Nilgiris, a village in Tamil Nadu
- Melur, Pudukkottai, a village in Tamil Nadu
- Melur, Tiruchirappalli, a village in Tamil Nadu
