= Aravenu =

Coordinates: 11°24′N 76°52′E

- village
- Interactive map of Aravenu
- Country: India
- State: Tamil Nadu

Languages
  - Official: Tamil
- Time zone: UTC+5:30 (IST)

Aravenu is a very small township near Kotagiri of The Nilgiris District, Tamil Nadu, India. The population is largely Badaga and Tamil . It is the headquarters of the Jakanarai panchayat.

It is located 4 km (2.5 mi) from Kotagiri town on the Kotagiri to Mettupalayam SH15. This is one of the Nilgiri Ghat Roads. A further road links Aravenu directly with Coonoor via Bandishola.

Catherine Falls is located approximately 3 km (1.9 mi) from Aravenu.

The area is rich in wildlife. Indian bison can be spotted grazing in the wooded areas. Other animals that thrive here include leopards, spotted deer and wild boar.

Catherine Falls Shola

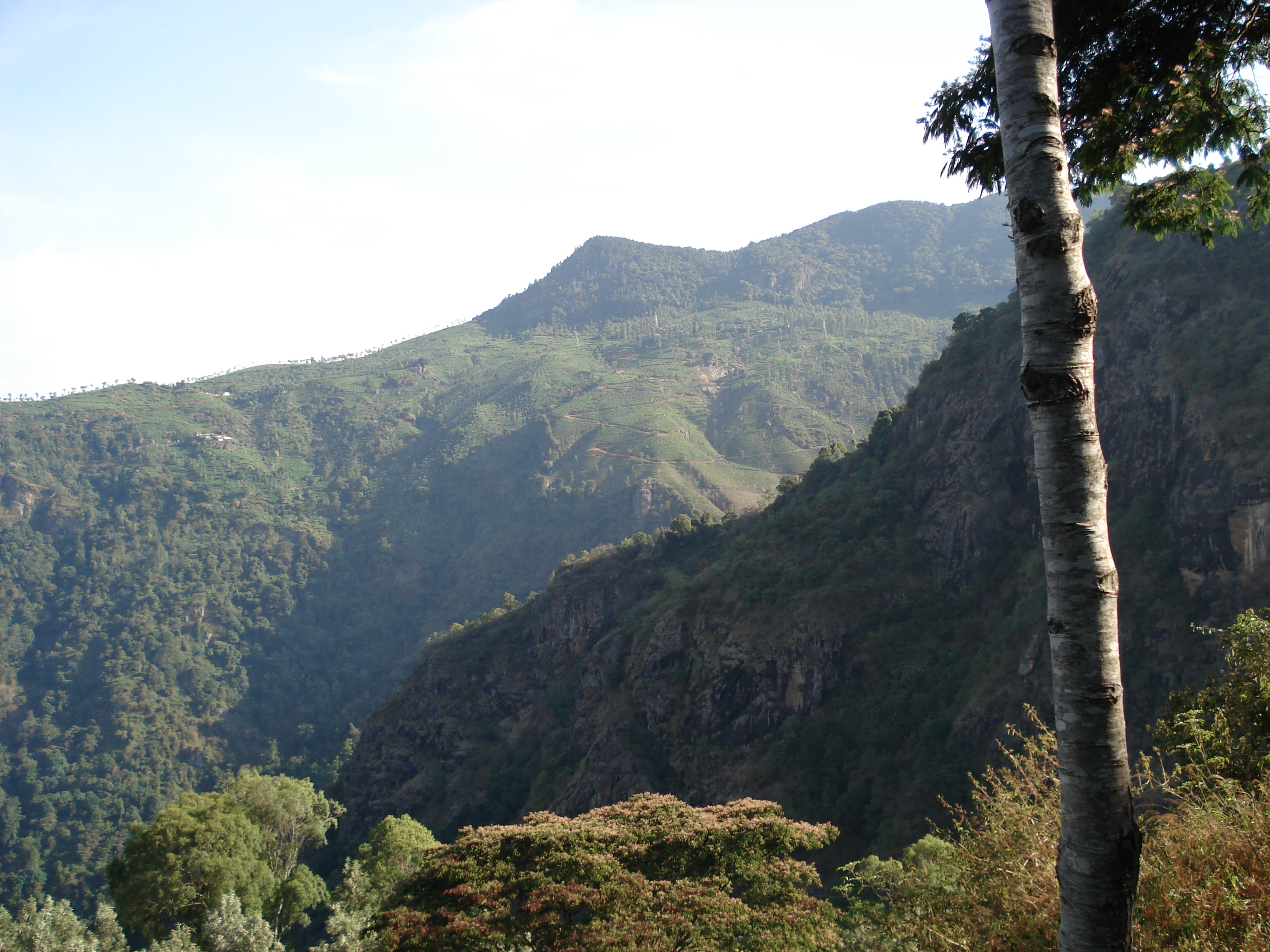
Amazing Valley

Catherine Falls
