= 2021 Indian Air Force Mil Mi-17 crash =

Helicopter crash in India with 14 fatalities

2021 Indian Air Force Mi-17 crash
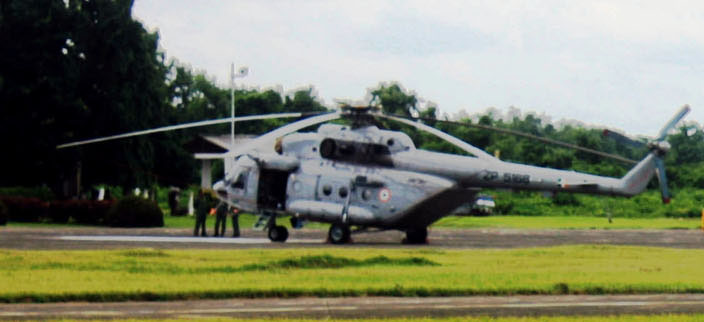
- An Indian Mil Mi-17V-5, similar to the one involved

Accident
- Date: 8 December 2021
- Summary: Controlled flight into terrain, due to weather-related spatial disorientation
- Site: Nanjappachatiram, Bandishola panchayat, Coonoor taluk, Nilgiris district, Tamil Nadu, India; 11°19′57″N 76°48′28″E

Aircraft
- Aircraft type: Mil Mi-17V-5
- Operator: Indian Air Force
- Registration: ZP 5164
- Flight origin: Sulur Air Force Station, Tamil Nadu, India
- Destination: Defence Services Staff College, Wellington, Tamil Nadu, India
- Occupants: 14
- Passengers: 10
- Crew: 4
- Fatalities: 14
- Survivors: 0

On 8 December 2021, a Mil Mi-17V-5 transport helicopter operated by the Indian Air Force (IAF) crashed between Coimbatore and Wellington in the state of Tamil Nadu after departing from Sulur Air Force Station. The helicopter was carrying Chief of Defence Staff General Bipin Rawat and 13 others, including his wife and staff. Everyone on board was killed in the immediate aftermath, except Group Captain Varun Singh, who died from his injuries at a hospital a week later.

== Background ==
=== Aircraft ===
The Russian-built Mil Mi-17 medium-lift helicopter was one of the first batch of 80 of its type built for the IAF under the terms of a 2008 contract. Delivered to the IAF in 2011 and inducted into service in 2012, the helicopter had flown over 26 hours without incident since its most recent servicing.

=== Crew ===
Wing Commander Prithvi Singh Chauhan, the commanding officer of 109 Helicopter Unit, was the pilot in command, with co-pilot Squadron Leader Kuldeep Singh and two junior warrant officers comprising the rest of the crew.

== Accident ==
The passengers had boarded the flight around 11:45 a.m. local time (IST). At 11:48 a.m. local time, the helicopter took off with ten passengers and four crew members from Sulur Air Force Station, headed roughly 80 km (50 mi) to the Defence Services Staff College (DSSC) in Wellington, Tamil Nadu. General Rawat, his wife, and his staff were traveling to the DSSC, where Rawat was to address the college's faculty and student officers. The flight was scheduled to arrive at Wellington by 12:15 p.m. Shortly before losing contact with the Sulur Air force base at 12:08 p.m., the pilots had radioed air traffic control to confirm their imminent landing at the Wellington helipad. The aircraft then crashed near a residential colony of private tea estate employees on the outskirts of the hamlet of Nanjappachatiram, Bandishola panchayat, in the Katteri-Nanchappanchathram area of Coonoor taluk, Nilgiris district. The crash site was 10 km (6.2 mi) from the flight's intended destination.

According to an eyewitness, he saw "the helicopter coming down... it hit one tree and was on fire. There were plumes of smoke" when he ran over. "In minutes, the fire was higher" than his house. Villagers threw water over the fire in an attempt to put it out. Initial reports of the crash emerged around 12:20 p.m., with a search-and-rescue operation launched at 12:25 p.m. The IAF officially confirmed General Rawat's presence on the flight in a tweet sent at 1:53 p.m. Rescue operations continued until 3:25 p.m. Fire and Rescue Services personnel who managed to reach the crash site after some difficulty, as the site was 500 meters from a major road, reported the crash victims had been burnt beyond recognition.

== Casualties ==
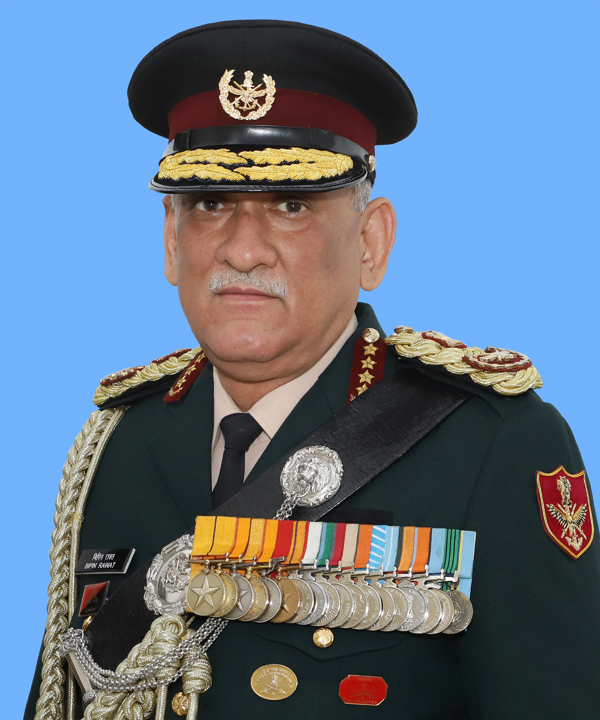
India's first Chief of Defence Staff General Bipin Rawat died in the crash.

The ten passengers on board the flight included Chief of Defence Staff General Bipin Rawat, his wife Madhulika Rawat, liaison officer Group Captain Varun Singh, SC and the general's personal staff, including his defense assistant Brigadier Lakhbinder Singh Lidder, Lieutenant Colonel Harjinder Singh, Wing Commander Prithvi Singh Chauhan, Squadron Leader Kuldeep Singh, Junior Warrant Officer Rana Pratap Das, Junior Warrant Officer Arakkal Pradeep, Lance Naik Vivek Kumar, Lance Naik B. Sai Teja, Havildar Satpal Rai, Naik Gursewak Singh and Naik Jitendra Kumar. Following the crash, the IAF released statements at 6:03 p.m. confirming the death of 13 of the 14 people on board, including General Rawat and his wife. As of 9:30 p.m. local time, all 13 of the bodies had been recovered from the crash site.

An instructor at the DSSC, Group Captain Varun Singh, was the initial survivor of the crash, and was taken to the military hospital in Wellington, Tamil Nadu, for surgery. Having sustained burns over 45% of his body, he was transferred to the Command Hospital in Bengaluru for further treatment on life support. He died from his injuries on 15 December 2021.

== Aftermath ==
The Cabinet Committee on Security (CCS), headed by Prime Minister Narendra Modi, met on the evening of the disaster to decide on a further course of action. The Minister of Defence Rajnath Singh made a formal announcement in Parliament of India on 9 December regarding the incident. The Opposition suspended its protests in Parliament for one day as a tribute to those who lost their lives in the crash.

== Investigation ==
The flight data recorder was recovered on the morning of 9 December. A tri-service court of inquiry was established by the Indian Air Force, headed by Air Marshal Manavendra Singh, the AOC-in-C Training Command. Early in January 2022, anonymous defense officials attached to the team indicated that the inquiry was complete and the probable cause of the accident was Controlled Flight Into Terrain (CFIT), which occurs when the pilot is in full control of the aircraft but due to faulty situational awareness the aircraft strikes the terrain. The chopper was reportedly flying at a low altitude when it entered a rolling cloud cover that drastically reduced visibility. In the process of trying to fly out of the cloud cover, it hit a cliff and crashed.

On 14 January 2022, the court of inquiry's preliminary findings were officially made public. It termed the accident "a result of entry into clouds due to unexpected change in weather conditions", which "led to spatial disorientation of the pilot resulting in Controlled Flight into Terrain". The court ruled out any mechanical failure, sabotage or negligence to be a cause of the accident.

In December 2024, a Standing Committee on defense report tabled in Lok Sabha stated that the Mi-17 crash, which took place on December 8, 2021, occurred because of "Human Error (Aircrew)".

== See also ==
- List of accidents and incidents involving military aircraft (2020–present)
- Smolensk air disaster
- 1986 Mozambican Tupolev Tu-134 crash
