= Nilgiri Ghat Roads =

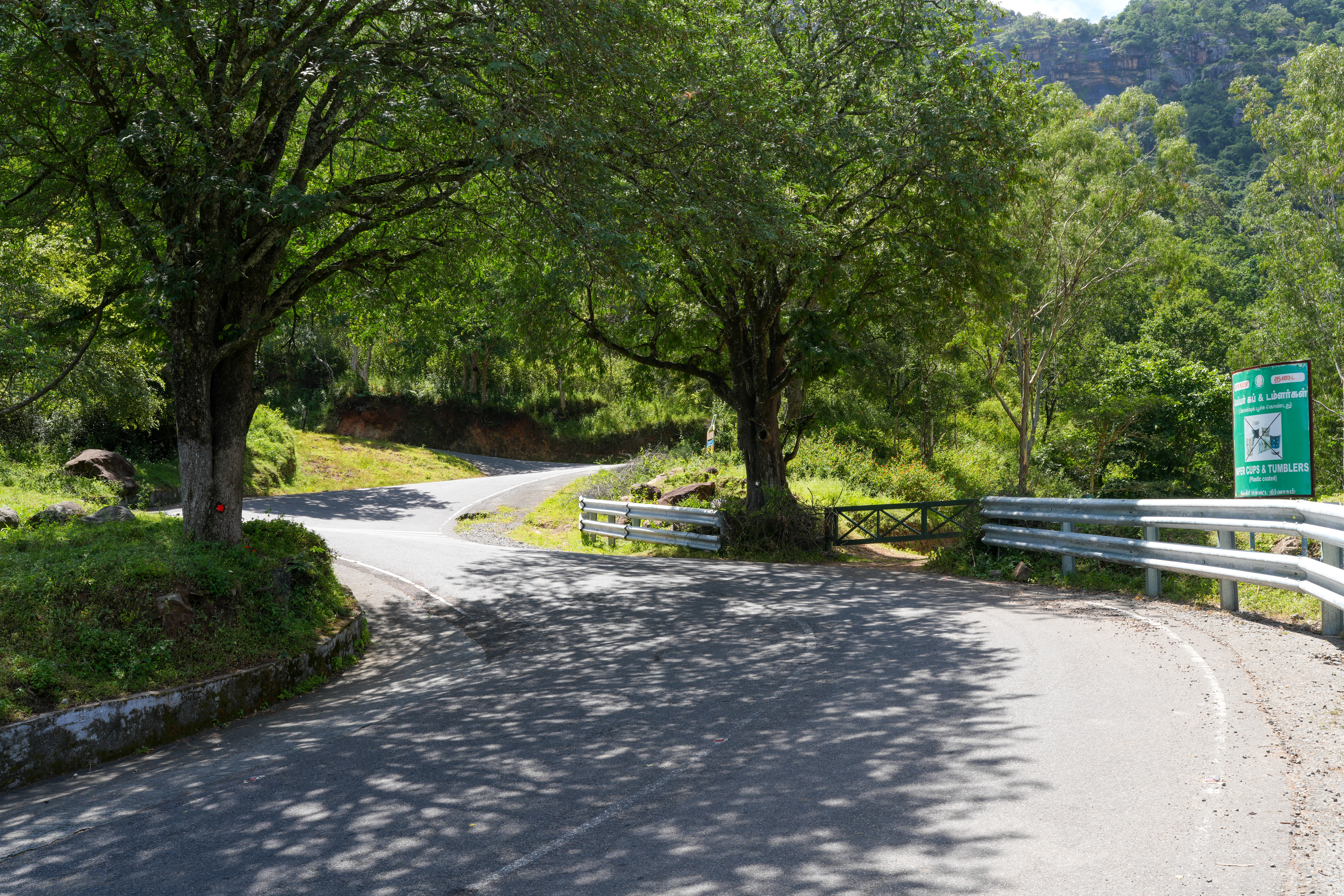
Sigur Ghat road climbing up from Mudumalai

Many Ghat Roads can be found in the Nilgiris District of Tamil Nadu, Southern India. Nearly all of the district is located in the Nilgiri Hills, part of the Western Ghats mountains. This area borders the states of Karnataka and Kerala. The hills consequently can be reached by road from three states. Most of these Ghat Roads go through heavily forested mountains and contain a number of sharp hair-pin bends.

== Route Descriptions ==
There are five main Ghat Roads leading into the Nilgiris:

=== Kotagiri Ghat (State Highway 15) ===
Route: Erode-Gobichettipalayam-Sathyamangalam-Mettupalayam-Aravenu-Kotagiri-Ooty

The Kotagiri Ghat is the oldest known route into the Nilgiris. It approximately follows the route taken by John Sullivan on his discovery trips in 1819. The distance between Mettupalayam and Kotagiri on this road is 33 km and it has only 4 hair pin bends. This road is part of State Highway 15. It is slightly less travelled as it is a slightly longer route from Mettupalayam to Ooty than the route via Coonoor, though as of 2012 the road condition is superior to the Coonoor Ghat road. It is also statistically less vulnerable to landslips. It is possible to divert from this route to Coonoor. There is a link from Aravenu to Bandishola.

Travellers reach Mettupalayam from Coimbatore and from Chennai via Erode and Gobichettipalayam.

=== Coonoor Ghat (National Highway 67) ===
Route: Coimbatore-Mettupalayam-Kallar-Burliar-Coonoor-Ooty-Pykara

This is also known as the Kallar Ghat, as it follows the valley of the Kallar and Coonoor rivers. It is by far the most traveled of all the Ghat Roads as it is the main access from the home state of Tamil Nadu. It has 14 numbered Hairpin bends and was recently (c.2003) taken over to be owned and maintained by the National Highways Authority of India and is now part of National Highway 181. Previously a toll had to be paid for vehicles entering the Nilgiris district at the village of Burliar, which also provides a rest stop on the route.

The road was shut in 2010 due to landslides caused by heavy rains in the region. Subsequently, the National Highways Authority of India had the road re-laid which got eroded, again due to rains. In 2012, the Highways Department decided to initiate criminal proceedings against the NHAI, under Section 133 of Criminal Penal Code, dealing with acts endangering human life, due to non maintenance of the road.

=== Gudalur Ghat (National Highway 212 and 67) ===
Route: Gundlupet-Bandipur-Mudumalai-Gudalur-Ooty

This is also simply known as the Mysore Ghat or Mysore Road. It is the main access route from Karnataka and Kerala. Travellers from Karnataka reach Gundlupet via the Mysore-Gundlupet National Highway 212 and travellers from Kerala reach Gudalur via the continuation of National Highway 212 from Kozhikode-Sultan Bathery.

One traveller commented about this route: "The road from Mysore is arguably the most scenic with a long stretch that runs through the Mudumalai National Park, and if travelling in the early morning or late evening, you will definitely spot wildlife feeding along the road, even the odd carnivore. There are majestic stands of Eucalyptus amidst well tended tea estates as you near Gudalur, and then you drive past the Pykara Dam and Pykara falls".

As with the Coonoor Ghat, from 2003 to 2006 this route was in a terrible state of repair. This route towards Gudalur from Ooty is the continuation of the same "National Highway" NH67 which makes up the Coonoor Ghat. National Highway 67 terminates in Gudulur where it joins National Highway 212 towards Gundlupet.

=== Sigur Ghat (Major District Road 700) ===
Route: Mudumalai-Kalhatti-Ooty

This is also known as Kalhatti Ghat (or simply 'Steep Ghat'). There is a short-cut branch off the Gudalur ghat at Theppakadu in Mudumalai. This route saves approximately 30 km (19 mi) on the standard Gudalur route, though it is by far the steeper route and is generally limited to short wheel-base vehicles. It has 36 hairpin bends and is closed overnight.

=== Manjur Ghat ===
Route: Karamadai(Coimbatore)-Athikadavu-Mulli-Geddai-Manjoor-Kundha Dam-Yedakadu-Mount Lawrence (Avalanji Road)-Emerald Cross Road-Muthurai Palada-Fern Hill-Ooty

This is a small and dangerous ghat for local Coimbatore city traffic towards Ooty, and is used as a backup road on the rare occasions that both the Coonoor Ghat and the Kotagiri Ghat are closed. The road is narrow with 47 hairpin bends below Manjoor. At Geddai, near the bottom of the ghat at 1,885 feet (575 m) there are two hydroelectric power stations . From Manjoor, at the top of the ghat, the distance is equidistant to either Ooty or Coonoor via other district roads. ODR.

== Conditions ==
Until recently, all access roads to the Nilgiri hills were toll roads in order to facilitate the high maintenance costs. Roads are now in much better condition that a few years ago. However, it is not uncommon for a route to be closed for several days or even weeks due to landslips. If so traffic is usually diverted onto one of the other ghats. The Nilgiris have been totally cut off on all routes on rare occasions. As the supply infrastructure depends on these routes, any road activity (such as a closure) is reflected in the prices. During the main tourist season, a one-way system is implemented between the first two ghat roads mentioned. Uphill traffic goes from Coimbatore to Ooty via Coonoor, whereas downhill traffic goes from Ooty to Coimbatore via Kotagiri.
