= Lakhbinder Singh Lidder =

Indian Army officer (1969–2021)

Brigadier Lakhbinder Singh Lidder SM VSM
- Born: 26 June 1969; New Delhi, India
- Died: 8 December 2021 (aged 52); Tamil Nadu, India
- Cause of death: Helicopter crash
- Military career
- Branch: Indian Army
- Service years: 1990–2021
- Rank: Brigadier
- Nickname: Tony
- Service number: IC-49905M
- Unit: 2 JAK RIF
- Commands: 136 Infantry Brigade
- Awards: Sena Medal; Vishisht Seva Medal

Brigadier Lakhbinder Singh 'Tony' Lidder SM VSM (26 June 1969 – 8 December 2021) was an Indian Army officer. He was the Defence Assistant to the Chief of Defence Staff (CDS) of the Indian Armed Forces General Bipin Rawat. He died in the 2021 Indian Air Force Mil Mi-17 crash along with the CDS and his wife, and 11 officers and defence personnel from the Indian Army and Indian Air Force.

== Early life and education ==
Born into a military family, Lidder - then still Singh - completed his studies at the Kendriya Vidyalaya in Mhow, where he was a brilliant student. After passing the exam for the National Defence Academy (NDA) on his first attempt, he joined the 77th course of the NDA in January 1987 and was assigned to the academy's India Squadron. After the NDA, he entered the Indian Military Academy (IMA) where he excelled, serving as cadet sergeant major of his company (Alamein Company) in his third term.

== Career ==
On 15 December 1990, Lidder was commissioned a second lieutenant in the second battalion, the Jammu and Kashmir Rifles. From 1992 to 1995, he served in the Kashmir Valley as a company commander and his battalion's adjutant, with promotion to lieutenant on 15 December 1992. During his posting, he played a key role in coordinating and directing his battalion's operations, and "for acts of exceptional devotion to duty or courage" was awarded the Sena Medal (SM) as an acting captain in the January 1994 Republic Day awards list. He also received the Chief of Army Staff's Commendation Card and the General Officer Commanding-in-Chief's Commendation Card for his services, and was promoted to substantive captain on 15 December 1995.

Lidder was subsequently posted to the NDA as a squadron commander, followed by appointment as an adjutant at the Indian Military Academy. Promoted to major on 15 December 2000, he adopted his surname of "Lidder" in 2003 while stationed at the NDA. During this period, he completed the Staff Course and the Higher Command Course, receiving promotion to lieutenant-colonel on 16 December 2004. He then commanded his battalion in the Democratic Republic of the Congo, as a part of the United Nations MONUSCO peacekeeping force, serving in an Indian Army brigade commanded by then-Brigadier Bipin Rawat.

Returning to India, Lidder served as a director at the Military Operations Directorate. He was promoted to substantive colonel (by selection) on 1 May 2009. He served as the defence attaché in the embassy in Kazakhstan before receiving promotion to brigadier on 20 September 2017 (seniority from 1 November 2015), and being given command of a brigade in Himachal Pradesh on the Indo-Tibetan border. A frequent writer and defence analyst, Lidder published a number of articles on Indian and regional military developments, including for the Centre for Land Warfare Studies. After completing advanced courses at the National Defence College, New Delhi, Lidder was selected by his former commanding officer Rawat, by then Chief of the Defence Staff, to serve as his Defence Assistant. Awarded the Vishisht Seva Medal (VSM) in 2020, he joined Rawat's staff that year. In 2021, he was selected for promotion to major general, and was scheduled to have been appointed General Officer Commanding (GOC) of a division in 2022.

== Death ==
Lidder died in the crash of an Indian Air Force Mil Mi-17V-5 transport helicopter on 8 December 2021. He was accompanying CDS Gen.Bipin Rawat, his wife and the rest of his staff on a flight to the Defence Services Staff College (DSSC) in Wellington, Tamil Nadu, where Rawat was scheduled to address the institution's personnel and students. At around 12:10 p.m. local time, the aircraft crashed near a residential colony of private tea estate employees on the outskirts of the hamlet of Nanjappachatiram, Bandishola panchayat, in the Katteri-Nanchappanchathram area of Coonoor taluk, Nilgiris district. The crash site was 10 km from the flight's intended destination. Apart from Group Captain Varun Singh, who was an instructor at the DSSC, all of the persons aboard the flight were killed; of those, only the bodies of General Rawat, his wife and Lidder could be readily identified.

Along with those of the others killed in the crash, Lidder's body was flown to Palam Air Base in Delhi on 9 December. He was cremated with full military honours at the Brar Square crematorium in Delhi Cantonment at 9:00 a.m. on 10 December 2021. Among those in attendance were Defence Minister Rajnath Singh, National Security Advisor Ajit Doval and Chief Minister of Haryana Manohar Lal Khattar.

== Personal life ==
Lidder was the son of the late Colonel Mehnga Singh. He was survived by his mother, brother Raj Lidder and sister Sukhwinder Cheema, along with his wife Geetika, a schoolteacher, and their 17-year-old daughter, Aashna.

== Decorations ==

	Sena Medal	Vishisht Seva Medal	
Samanya Seva Medal	Special Service Medal		Operation Parakram Medal
Sainya Seva Medal	High Altitude Service Medal	Videsh Seva Medal	50th Anniversary of Independence Medal
30 Years Long Service Medal	20 Years Long Service Medal	9 Years Long Service Medal	MONUSCO
