= Jegathala =

Coordinates: 11.36971°N 76.768099°E

Jegathala is a village in Nilgiris, located at an altitude of 1,850 m (6,070 ft) above sea level. It is 5 km from Coonoor and 13 km from Ooty.
