= Sampakhanda =

Sampkhanda
- Village/Hill Station
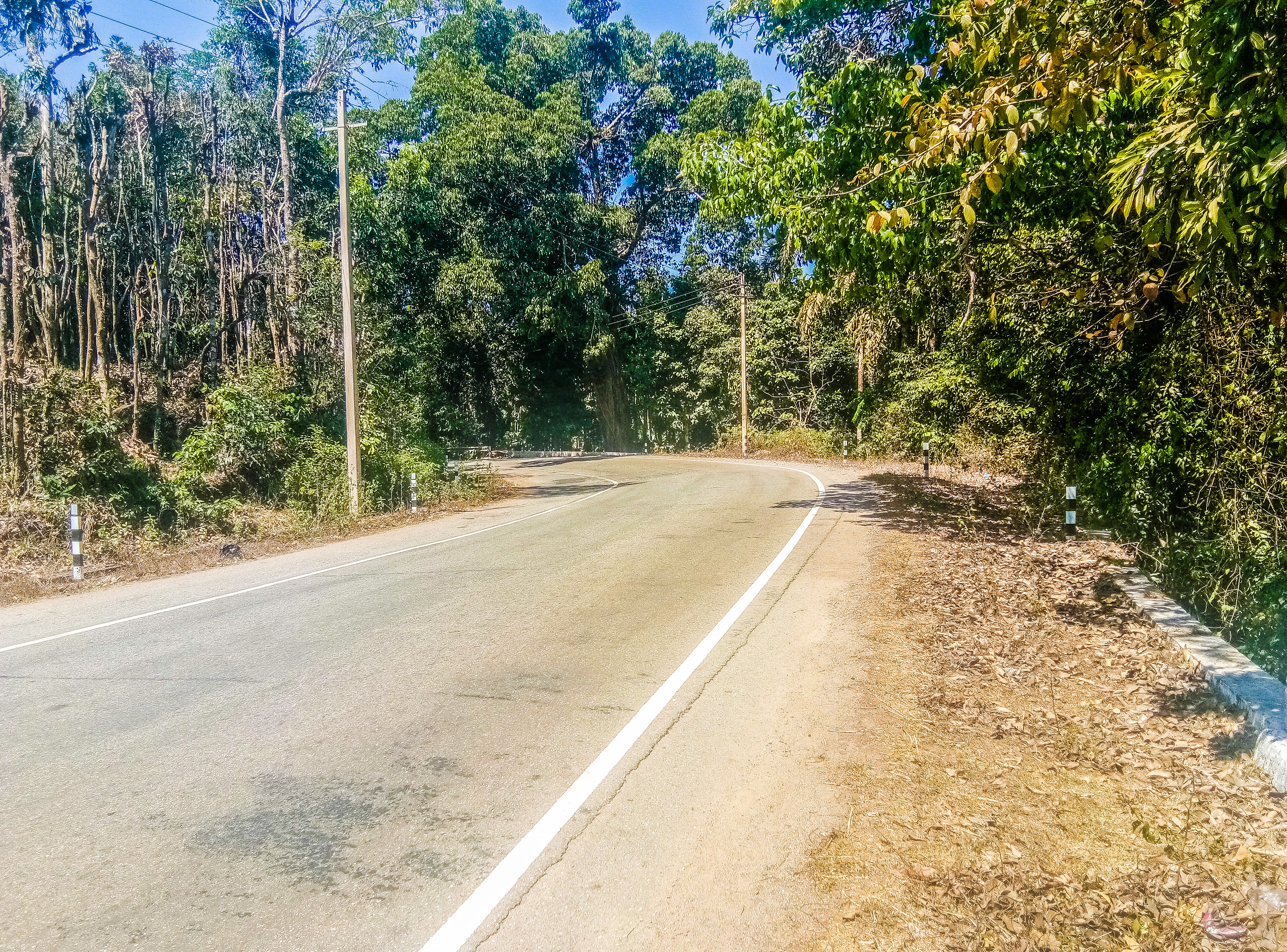
- NH 766E routing towards Devimane Ghat in Sampkhanda

- Location in Karnataka, India
- Coordinates: 14.5441154°N 74.7058998°E
- Country: India
- Region: Western Ghats
- Taluk: Sirsi
- State: Karnataka
- District: Uttara Kannada
- Elevation: 576 m (1,890 ft)

Population (2011)
  - Total: 337

Languages
  - Official: Kannada
- Time zone: UTC+5:30 (IST)
- Vehicle registration: KA-31
- Literacy: 82.8%

Sampkhanda or Samphakanda is a village in the Western Ghats located in Sirsi Taluk of Uttara Kannada District, Karnataka, India. National Highway 766E passes through the village. It is 18 km (11 mi) away from Devimane Ghat and about 16 km (9.9 mi) from its Taluk Headquarters at Sirsi. Sampakhanda is considered one of the coldest places in Karnataka during summer season.

== Climate ==
Sampakhanda has a tropical highland rainforest climate with plenty of rainfall and humid feel. The temperature often drops below 15 °C even in summer making it one of the coldest places in Karnataka. In spite of its high elevation, relative humidity affects the climate because of ocean proximity. The highest temperature recorded is 40.2 °C and lowest temperature recorded is 3.2 °C. The average temperature here is 21.6 °C. Highly influenced by south west monsoon, the region records as one of the wettest place in the world and holds one of the places in UNESCO's hottest place in the Western Ghats. The average annual rainfall here is 5572mm.

Climate data for Sampakhanda, KA, India
Month	Jan	Feb	Mar	Apr	May	Jun	Jul	Aug	Sep	Oct	Nov	Dec	Year
Mean daily maximum °C (°F)	28.8 (83.8)	30 (86)	31.1 (88.0)	32.5 (90.5)	31.9 (89.4)	25.3 (77.5)	24.3 (75.7)	24.8 (76.6)	25.4 (77.7)	26.7 (80.1)	27.5 (81.5)	28.6 (83.5)	29.6 (85.3)
Mean daily minimum °C (°F)	17.2 (63.0)	18.4 (65.1)	20.1 (68.2)	21.2 (70.2)	22.3 (72.1)	20.0 (68.0)	19.9 (67.8)	19.8 (67.6)	19.5 (67.1)	18.7 (65.7)	17.5 (63.5)	17.4 (63.3)	17.9 (64.2)
Average rainfall mm (inches)	1 (0.0)	6 (0.2)	23 (0.9)	87 (3.4)	145 (5.7)	1,181 (46.5)	2,093 (82.4)	1,309 (51.5)	427 (16.8)	167 (6.6)	119 (4.7)	14 (0.6)	5,572 (219.3)
Average rainy days	1	1	2	7	8	25	28	27	14	12	9	2	136
Source: ksndm

== Nature and Terrain ==
This village is surrounded by lush and dense forest. This type of forest comes under Tropical Evergreen Forest owned by Karnataka Forest Department, Sirsi Division. The elevation in this region is uneven, it varies from 542m to 801m. This place also provides home to several Wild animals and is one of the Elephant Corridor region.it is located in National Highway ie NH 766E (sirsi Kumta Hwy)

== See also ==
- Karwar
- Mangalore
- Sirsi
