= Burliar =

- village
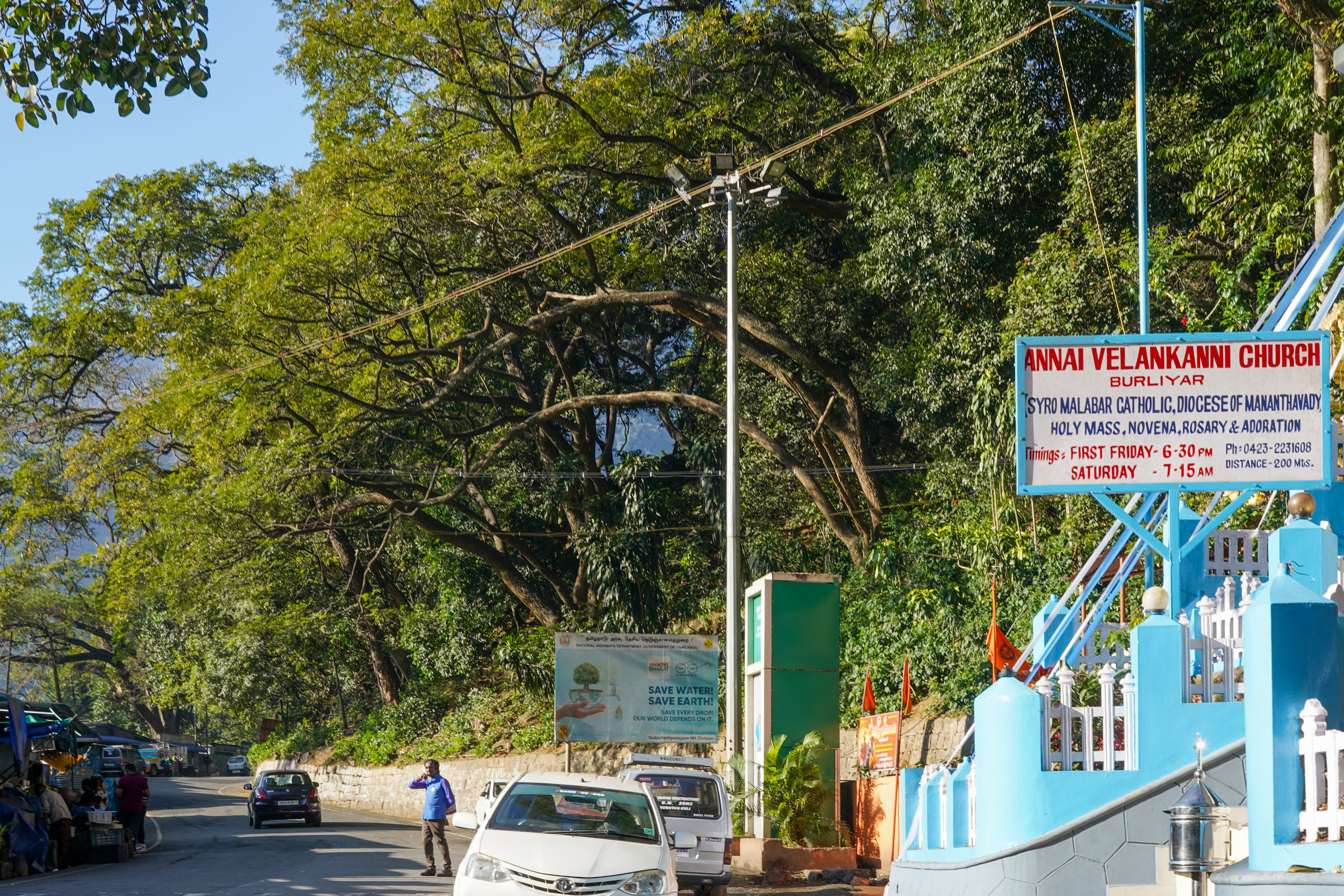
- NH-181 in Burliar

- Location in Tamil Nadu, India
- Coordinates: 11°20′36″N 76°50′55″E
- Country: India
- State: Tamil Nadu
- District: Nilgiris

Languages
  - Official: Tamil
- Time zone: UTC+5:30 (IST)
- Vehicle registration: TN 43
- Nearest city: Coimbatore
- Climate: VERY COOL (Köppen)

Burliar (also Burliyar and Varaliyaru) is a Panchayat village in Coonoor Taluk of The Nilgiris District, Tamil Nadu, India. Situated on the ghat road from Mettupalayam to Coonoor, Burliar is a popular rest stop with several small shops and restaurants. It has a government horticulture farm that was started in 1871.

== History ==
A horticulture farm, Burliar Gardens, was started in 1871 by K.B. Thomas, the then Collector of Coimbatore and Nilgiris. This was subsequently converted into today's State Horticulture Farm. Over 100 years ago, Burliar was the first place in Asia, besides the Malayan archipelago, where mangosteen and nutmeg were introduced and flourished. Durian was introduced in 1898.

In 1876–77, two plants of Liberian coffee and some mahogany were planted in the Burliar Gardens. A total of 1,013 fruit plants were issued by the Gardens. During that year, the fruit trees were leased out to a contractor, thus keeping the expenditure low.

== Geography ==
Burliar is situated on National Highway NH 181 between Mettupalayam(Coimbatore) and Coonoor on the Coonoor Ghat Road at an altitude of 800 to 830 m (2,620 to 2,720 ft) above mean sea level. It is located in a tropical to sub-tropical climatic zone. It is near the border between The Nilgiris District and the Coimbatore District.

== Demographics ==
As per the Census of India 2011, Burliar with a total area of 1,674.7 ha (4,138 acres) had a population of 3,676 in 1,085 households. Females constitute 51.1% of the population, and 10.04% of the people are in the age group 0–6 years. The literacy rate is 70.0%, with male literacy of 75.9% being higher than female literacy of 64.3%. Scheduled Castes comprise 38.1% of the population while Scheduled Tribes are 10.5%.

== Amenities ==
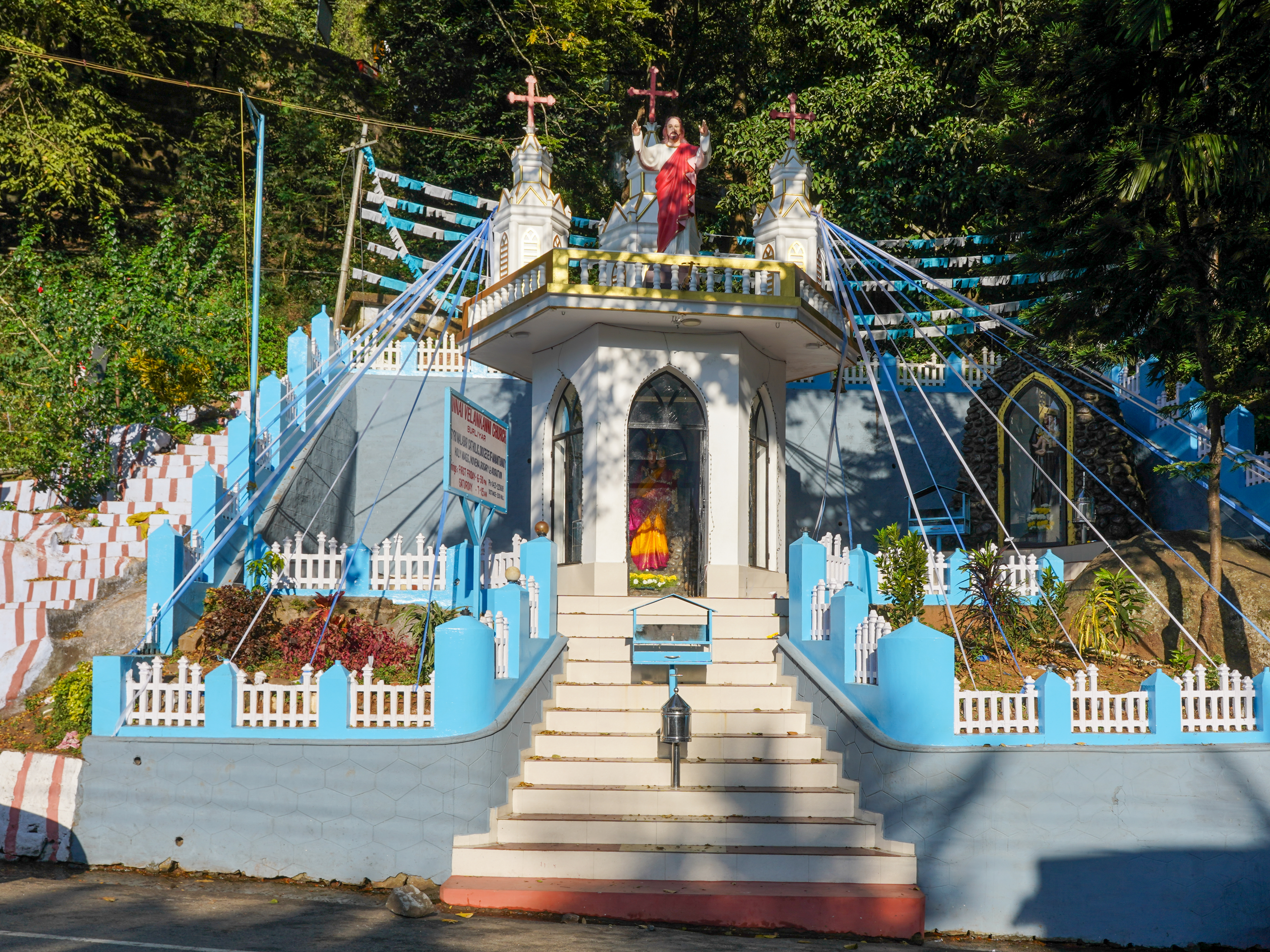
Annai Velankanni Church

=== Traffic checkpost ===
Burliar has one of three checkposts setup by the Nilgiris District police for monitoring traffic into the Nilgiris District. During the peak tourist season, the inflow and outflow of traffic at these checkposts is used to predict congestion in Coonoor or Udhagamandalam, the major towns of the district.

=== Annai Velankanni Church ===
Annai Velankanni Church is a Roman Catholic shrine located in Burliar. The shrine is administered by the parish priest of St. Sebastian's Church, Coonnoor.

== Economy ==
Burliar is best known as a rest stop on this Ghat Road. Most people are employed in the running of small shops and restaurants that cater to the needs of travelers. When the road has been closed (for example due to landslides), many of the villagers have left to seek other employment elsewhere.

Besides catering to travelers, Burliar is largely agrarian. About 33.5% of the total area of 1,674.7 ha (4,138 acres) is devoted to agriculture and horticulture, while 47.2% remains forested.

=== State Horticulture farm ===
This 150-year old horticulture farm has an area of about 6.25 ha (15.4 acres) divided into 68 terraces. Spices and fruits are grown. Spices grown include clove, nutmeg, cinnamon, pepper, and vanilla. Fruits grown include mangosteen, jackfruit, durian, litchi, longsal, carambola, grapefruit, rose apple and mango.
