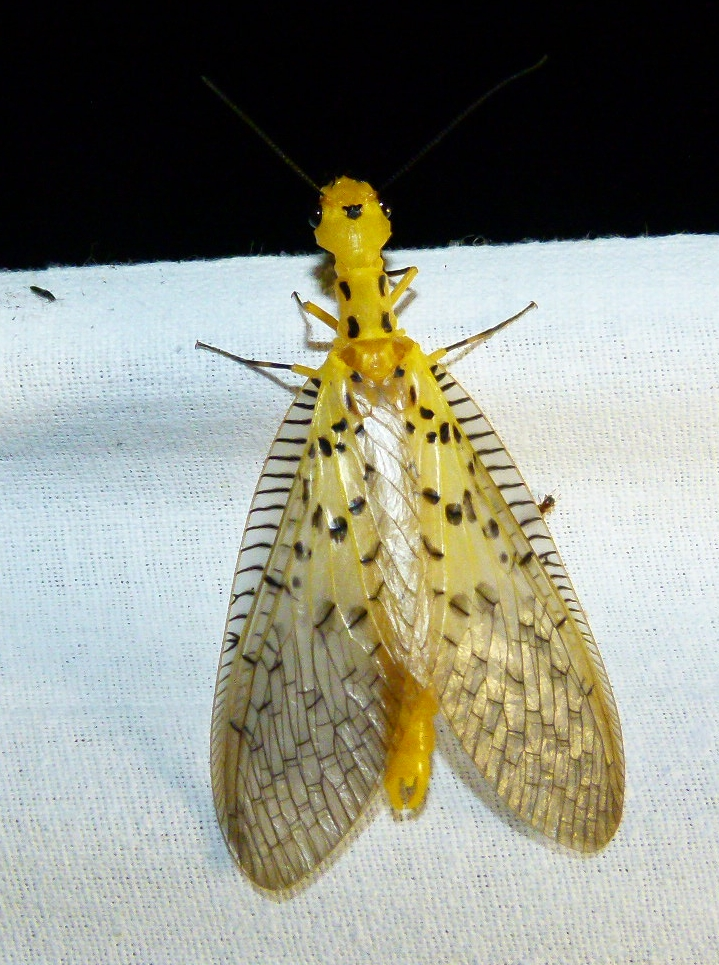
- Adult male

Scientific classification
- Domain: Eukaryota
- Kingdom: Animalia
- Phylum: Arthropoda
- Class: Insecta
- Order: Megaloptera
- Family: Corydalidae
- Genus: Nevromus
- Species: N. austroindicus

Binomial name
- Nevromus austroindicus Liu & Viraktamath, 2012

= Nevromus austroindicus =

Species of insect

Nevromus austroindicus is a species of dobsonfly found in the Western Ghats of India. It is one of two species of the family Corydalidae found in southern India, the other being Neurhermes maculifera (Walker, 1853). It was formally described in 2012 on the basis of specimens from the Karnataka Western Ghats of Kottigehara with some specimens also obtained from near Sampaje. They are closely related to species found in mainland China.

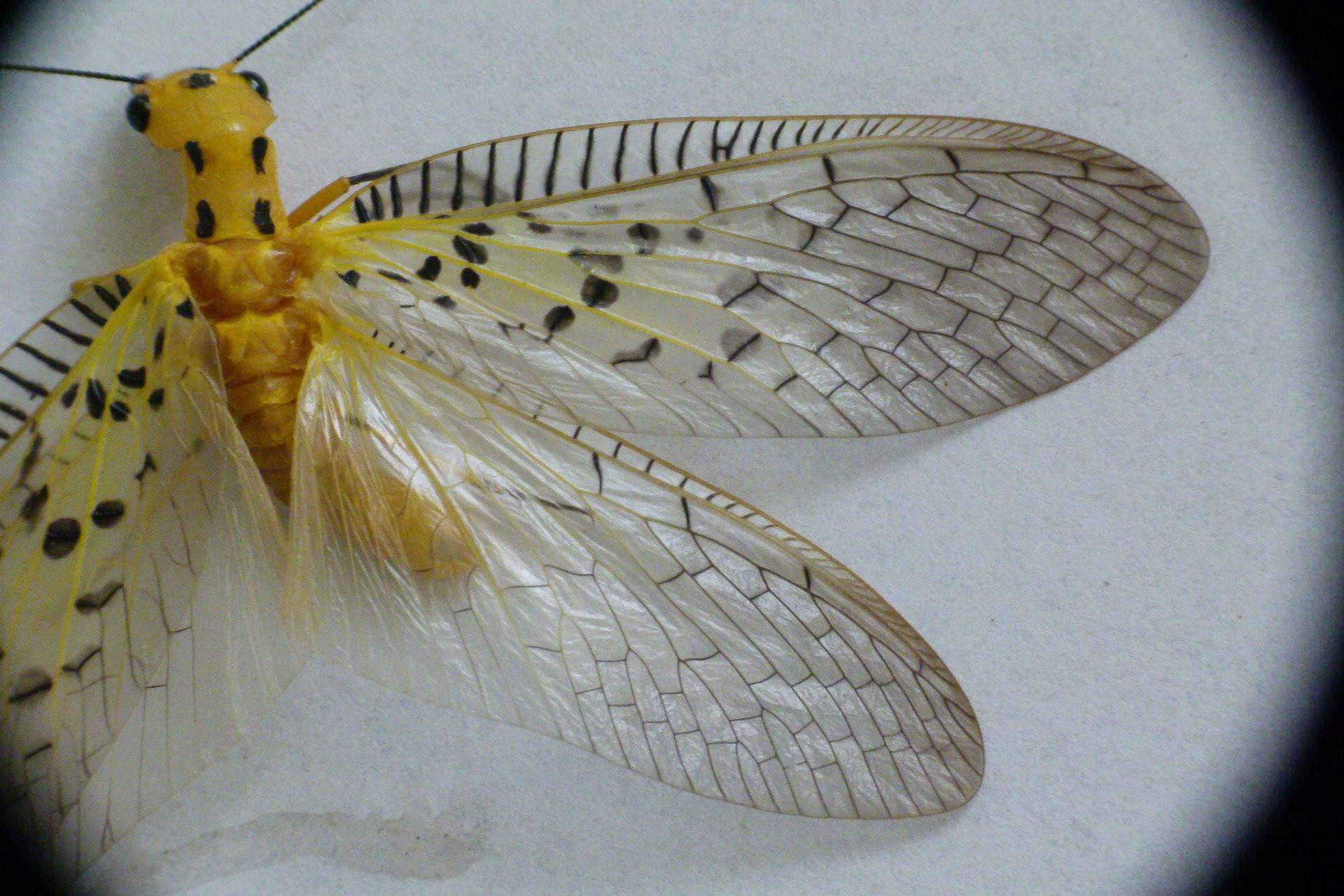
The large spots on the base of the forewing are distinctive

The adult is characterized by the forewings having black spots on the crossveins which are larger than on other species in the genus. The male genitalia have a uniquely shaped tenth gonocoxite. The head and thorax are yellow. The yellow ocelli are found on a region of the head marked by a small black spot. The species name austroindicus means "south Indian", referring to its restricted distribution. The larva is not described but it is expected to be found in montane streams where it is an active predator. Like other tropical members, they may take about two years to metamorphose into adults.

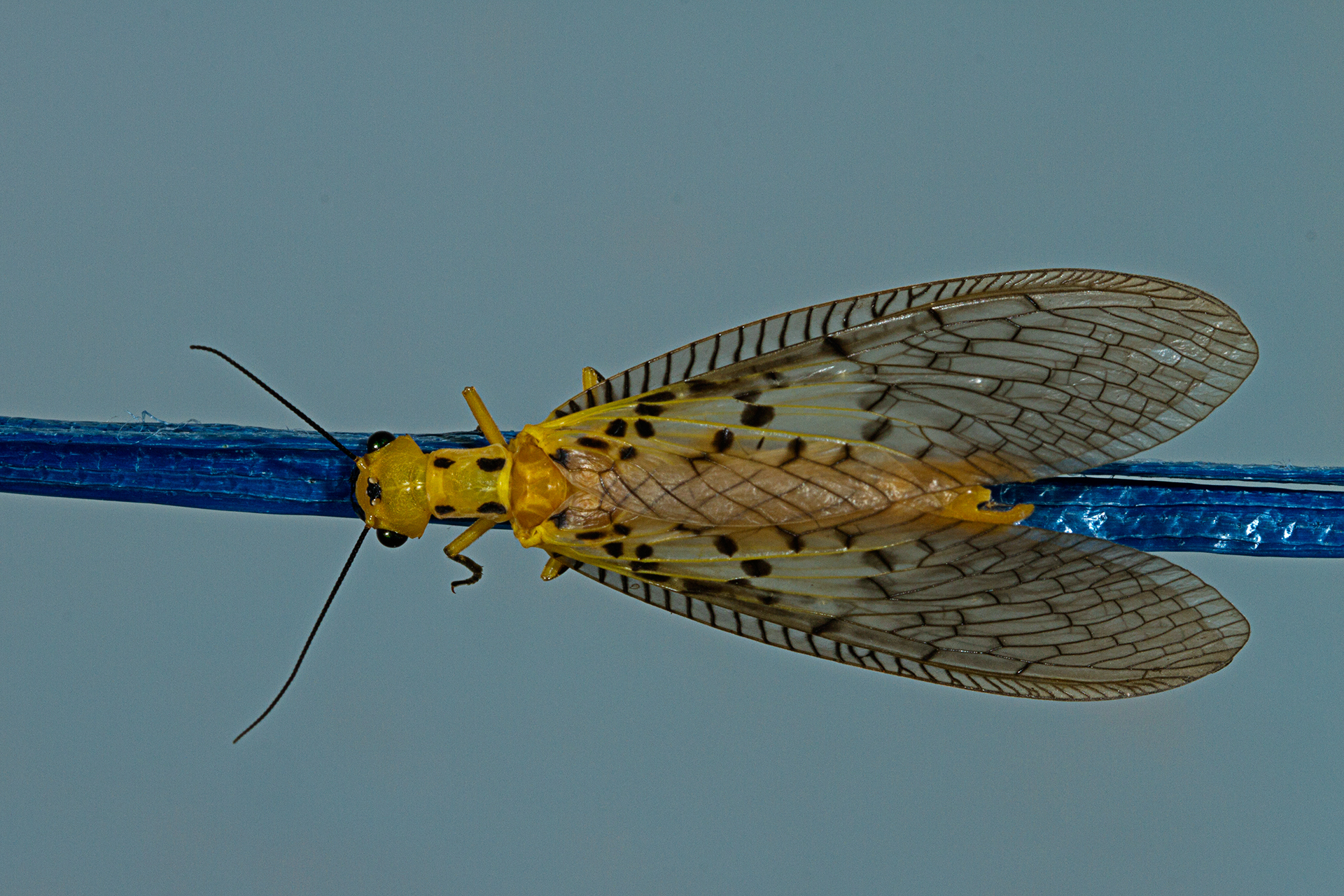
Specimen from Chikmagalur

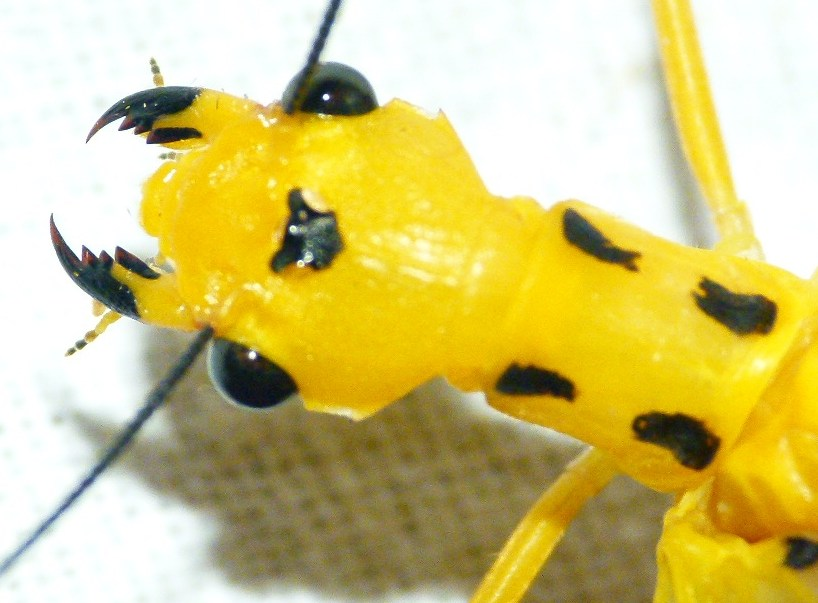
Head
