= Satellite Silkworm Breeding Station =

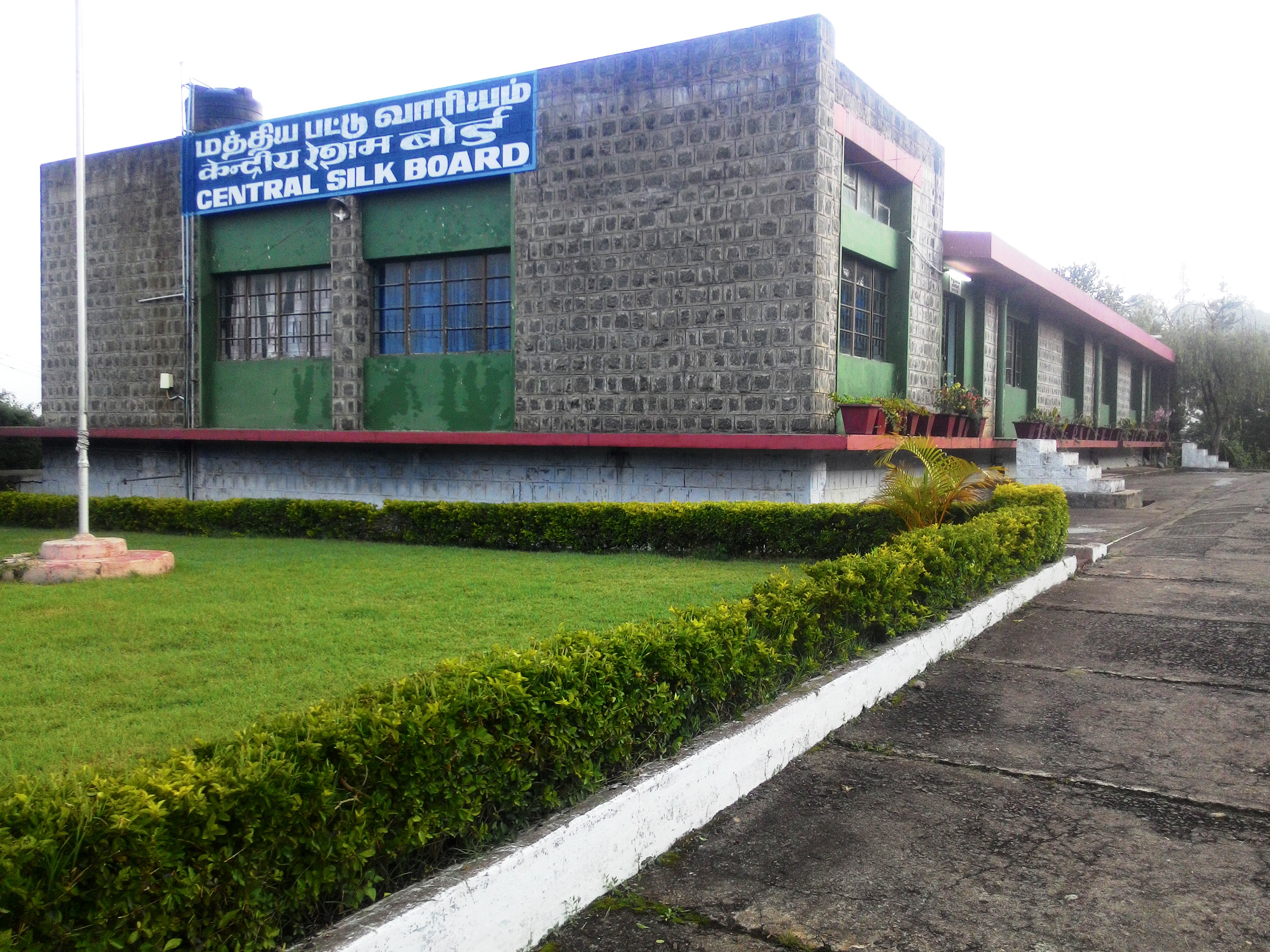
Satellite Silkworm Breeding Station at Coonoor

The Satellite Silkworm Breeding Station, Coonoor, is an institute that was established by the British Govt. in 1908 for manufacturing surgical suture guts for soldiers of Second World War. During 1919 the station became Sericulture Demonstration Farm-cum-Guts Section. In 1943 by acquiring lands, the Demonstration Farm was converted into Hill Rearing Station. During the years, the increased demand for silk for defense purpose made it imperative for strengthening the station for supply of industrial F1 silkworm seeds. Since the demand for "Foreign Race" to meet the male component necessitated the production of seeds at this station which had favourable climatic conditions the station was converted into Foreign Race Seed Station during 1944 and the station began to collect and maintain different exotic silkworm races from various leading silk producing countries of the World. These races were ultimately supplied to Central Silkworm Seed Station, Sri Nagar in 1958, where they were maintained as Germplasm Bank.

During initial stages, the station was meeting the requirements of foreign race layings of Madras State only. After the formation of Central Silk Board in 1949, other sericultural states in the country also shared the benefits of this station through CSB.

In November 1961, Govt. of Madras gifted this station to CSB which was named as Silkworm Seed Station, which assisted the Central Silkworm Seed Station, Sri Nagar in isolation, purification and fixation of races and breeding work throughout the country and played a vital role in the silkworm seed organisation.

In 1977 the Silkworm Seed Station was upgraded and named as Regional Sericultural Research Station under overall Technical and Administrative control of Central Sericultural Research & Training Institute, Mysore

During 2003 the station was renamed as Satellite Silkworm Breeding Station under the Central Sericultural Research & Training Institute, Mysuru with mandates to conserve breeders stock of bivoltine silkworm germplasm, to undertake the breeding programmes in coordination with Bivoltine Breeding Lab, CSR&TI-Mysore, to undertake field trials of breeds developed by CSRTI-Mysore, SSBS-Coonoor, to undertake silkworm and mulberry evaluation trials under All India Coordinated Experiments, to impart need-based trainings and Technical guidance to stakeholders of Dept. of Sericulture, Govt. of Tamil Nadu.
