= Yedapalli =

- village
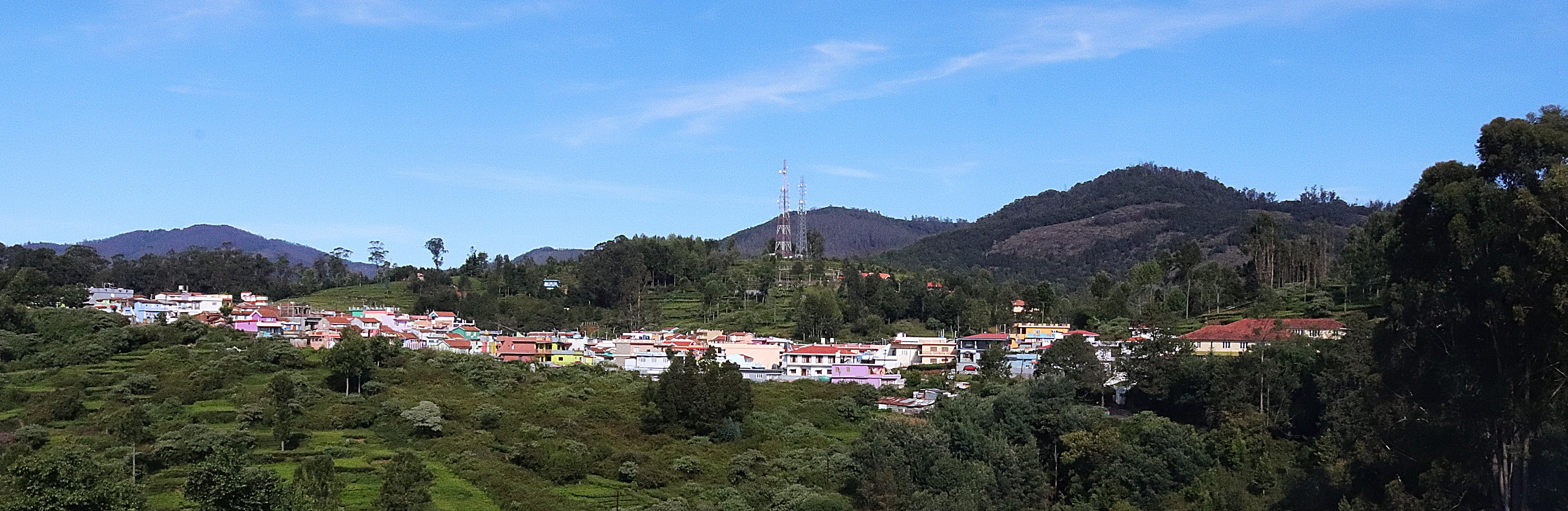
- View of Yedapalli village from a neighbouring ridge; Copyright Ajay Ludra

- Location in Tamil Nadu, India Yedapalli (India)
- Coordinates: 11.379165°N 76.810815°E
- Country: India
- State: Tamil Nadu

Population
  - Total: 10,500

Languages
  - Official: Tamil
- Time zone: UTC+5:30 (IST)
- Literacy: 80%
- Climate: Moderate (Köppen)

Yedapalli is a Panchayat village in Coonoor Taluk of The Nilgiris District, Tamil Nadu, India.

== Location ==
Yedapalli is situated about 4.7 km from Sim's Park in Coonoor on the MDR 1073 that leads from Coonoor to Kotagiri.

The village is bounded by:

- Bandisholai to the South, the preceding hamlet when driving up from Coonoor.
- Ellithorai to the North, the village succeeding when driving away towards Kotagiri.
- Aracombai to the West, a settlement of Sri Lankan Tamils in the interior, adjoining the Black-Ridge reserved-forest.
- The south and west of the village limits are bounded by the Black-Ridge reserve-forest.

== Geography ==
Yedapalli has two marshes; one lies in a bowl in the rear of the village, and adjoins the Black-Ridge reserve-forest; the other lies alongside the MDR 1073, towards the village boundary in the direction of Coonoor. The entire village sources its water from these two marshes. Restoration of the marshland is underway, under the aegis of Clean-Coonoor, an NGO. Run-off from the marsh forms a perennial trickle, which flows southwest-wards through the Spring-Field and High-Field tea-estates, picks up strength, flows past Wellington Gymkhana Club's golf-course, and eventually joins the Coonoor river as Ganguathorai.

Vitrag-Group's HillsDale is a gated-community located on the northern end of the village, on the MDR 1073, towards Ellithorai.
