= Devimane Ghat =

Village and hill station in Malenadu, Karnataka, India

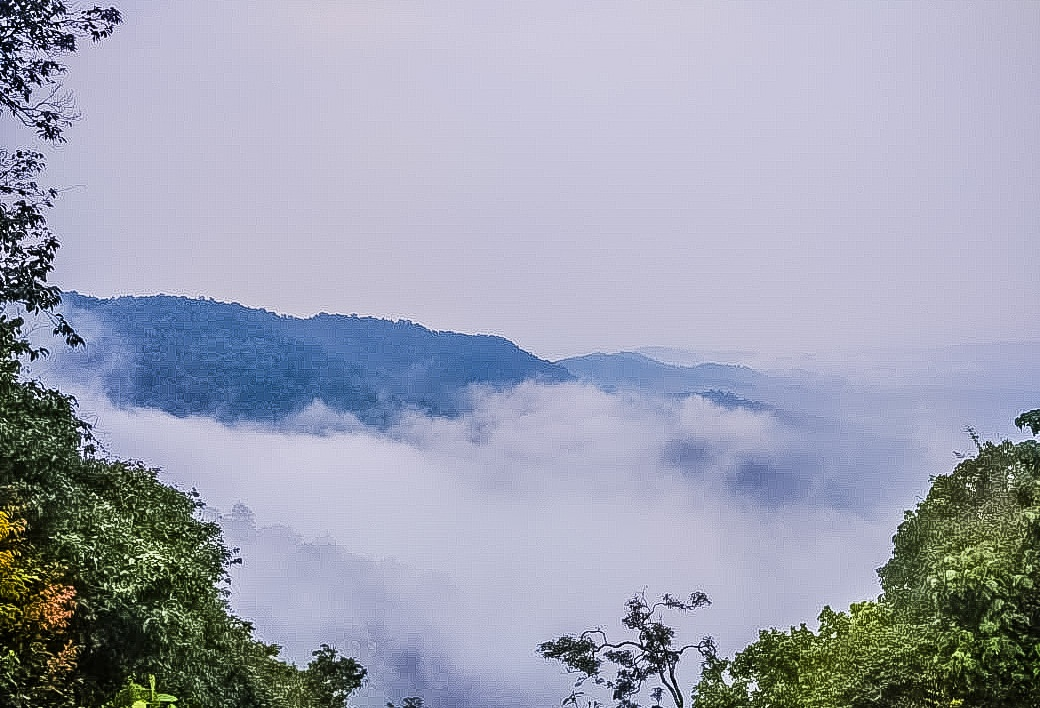
- Devimane Ghat view point covered by fog

- Location within Karnataka
- Elevation: 567 metres (1,860 ft)

Third Approach
- Location: Devimane, Sirsi
- Range: Sahyadri
- Coordinates: 14°31′10″N 74°34′26″E

Devimane is a hill station and high-altitude village in Sirsi taluk of Malenadu region in Karnataka, India. The road to reach the village is named Devimane Ghat, and lies in NH 766E ultimately connecting Malenadu city Sirsi and Karavali town Kumta. Being under the lush forest zone in Uttara Kannada District, it consists of 10 hairpin curves with a well-engineered road that reduces the risk of accidents. The road's elevation ranges from 25 to 567 metres (80 to 1,860 ft). A temple of Goddess Durga Devi is at the beginning of the road at elevation 429m. The ghat section was named after the temple, "Devimane", meaning "the home of goddess Devi". There are 5 hairpins curves between Devimane Temple and Sampakhanda.

After entering the Western Ghats, there are many sharp curves until Ekkambi. On the Deccan Plateau, three hairpin curves exist between Ekkambi and Sirsi. There are 12 bridges in this ghat section. At this point, the road becomes signed NH 766E(old SH69/SH142) and is maintained by the NHAI department. The ghat section has been posing a threat to the wildlife present in the slopes of Western Ghat mountain range. Wild animals, including elephants, were hit by vehicles at certain times of the day.

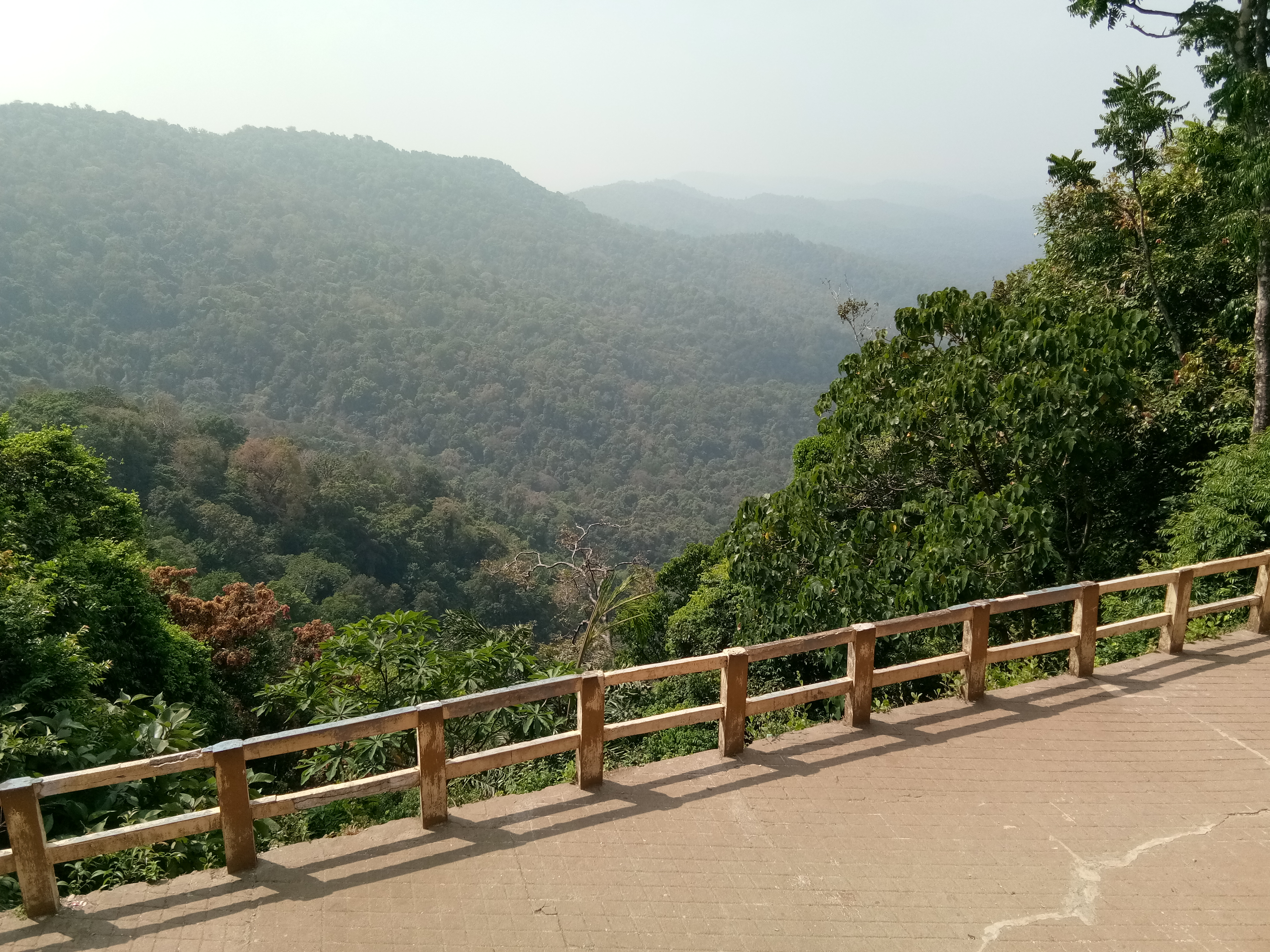
Devimane Ghat's clear View point in summer

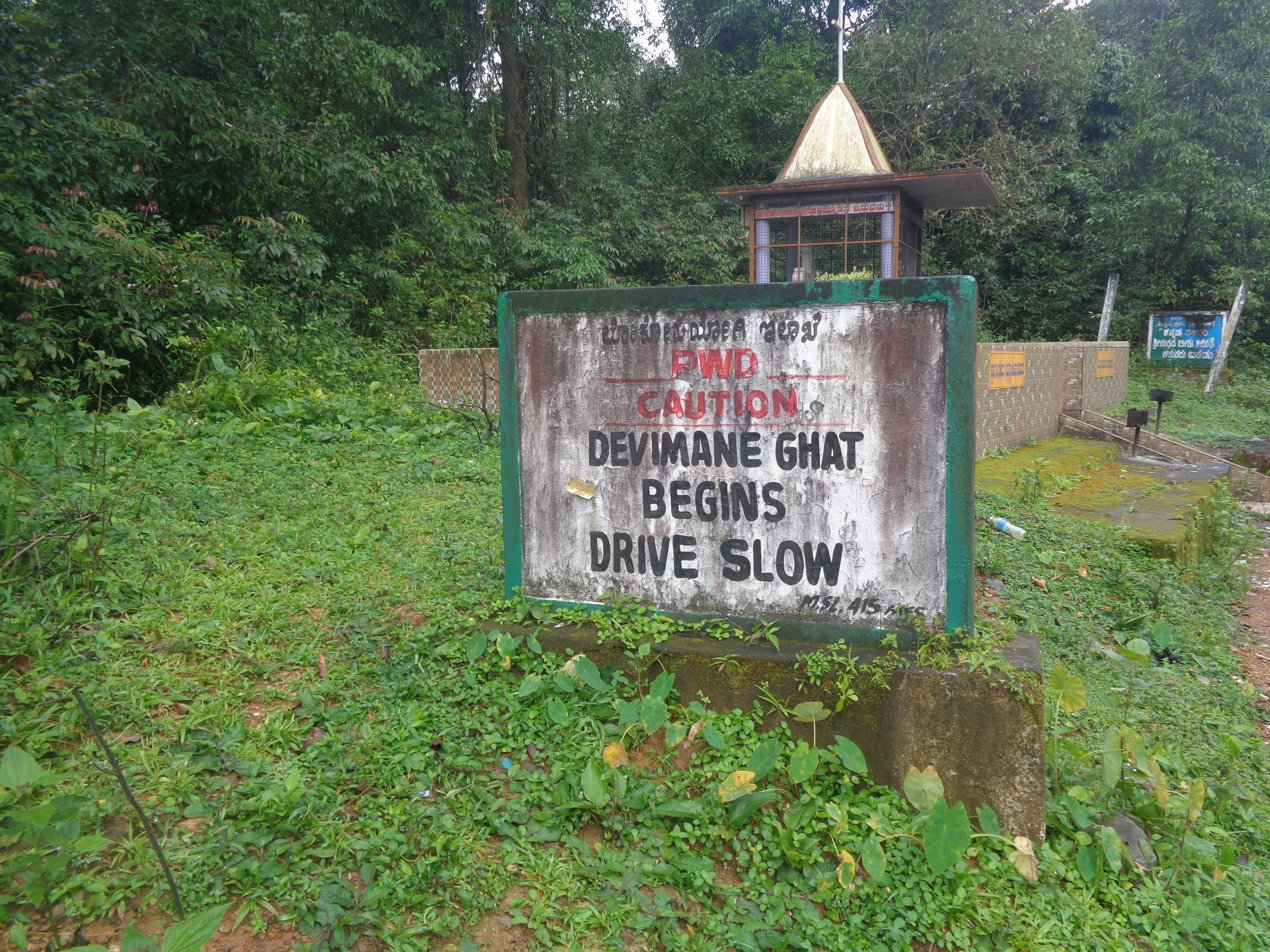
This road sign indicates the beginning of Devimane Ghat

== Climate ==
During the months of May, June, July, August, September this region receives heavy rainfall over 6000mm. Villages near Devimane ghat are Hebre, Bandla, Devimane, Hebbail, Kodambale, Sampakhanda receives over 5000mm of rainfall each year creating numerous rivers and waterfalls.

Due to the proximity of ocean the low elevated regions experience high-temperature rise over 40 °C during summer. But, in higher elevated regions the temperature would not go beyond 32 °C due to the presence of dense forest range caused by heavy rainfall.

Winter season commences from November and ends in February, as it lies in the high elevated region and close to the ocean it experiences Tropical Highland climate and it experiences shivery climate where the temperature drops below 10 °C and Sampakhanda being the coldest place where the temperature has dropped below 5 °C many times and even in summer season temperature often drops below 12 °C. Since the weather statistics have poor track in this region, perfection in the weather numbers has certain deviations. Even in lowland region near Devimane Ghat experiences cold during winter but temperature unusually drops below 15 °C.

Climate data for Devimane
Month	Jan	Feb	Mar	Apr	May	Jun	Jul	Aug	Sep	Oct	Nov	Dec	Year
Mean daily maximum °C (°F)	31 (88)	31 (88)	30 (86)	31 (88)	31 (88)	26 (79)	24 (75)	25 (77)	26 (79)	28 (82)	30 (86)	31 (88)	29 (84)
Mean daily minimum °C (°F)	17 (63)	17 (63)	20 (68)	22 (72)	23 (73)	21 (70)	21 (70)	21 (70)	21 (70)	20 (68)	20 (68)	19 (66)	20 (68)

== See also ==
- Ghat Roads
- Karwar
- Mangalore
- Sirsi
