= Hullickal =

- village
- Interactive map of Hullickal
- Coordinates: 11.319349°N 76.773244°E
- Country: India
- State: Tamil Nadu
- District: Nilgiris

Languages
  - Official: Tamil
- Time zone: UTC+5:30 (IST)

Hullickal or Pulikkal is a Revenue Village in Coonoor Taluk of the Nilgiris District, Tamil Nadu, India.
