= Athigaratty =

Athigaratty Adigaratty
- village
- Location in Tamil Nadu, India Athigaratty (India)
- Coordinates: 11.33567°N 76.697141°E
- Country: India
- State: Tamil Nadu

Languages
  - Official: Badugu
- Time zone: UTC+5:30 (IST)
- Vehicle registration: TN 43

Athigaratty (also known as Adigaratty) is a hamlet located in the Nilgiri Hills in the state of Tamil Nadu. One of the largest villages in the Nilgirs South India with over 800 households.

Athigaratty is located 10 km from Udagamandalam and 18 km from Coonoor. It is one of the largest Badaga Hattis (villages) in the Nilgiris in terms of the number of houses, next only to village of Nanjanadu. The major occupation of the people of Athigaratty is tea plantation. The local dialect of the Nilgiris is Badaga and Tamil Athigaratty is popular for 'Ther Abba' (Ther = chariot, Abba = Festival) procession, an annual carnival which draws a large crowd from around the Nilgiris.
