= Ghat Roads =

Access routes into the mountainous Western and Eastern Ghats in India

Coordinates: 13.6422638°N 79.3721351°E

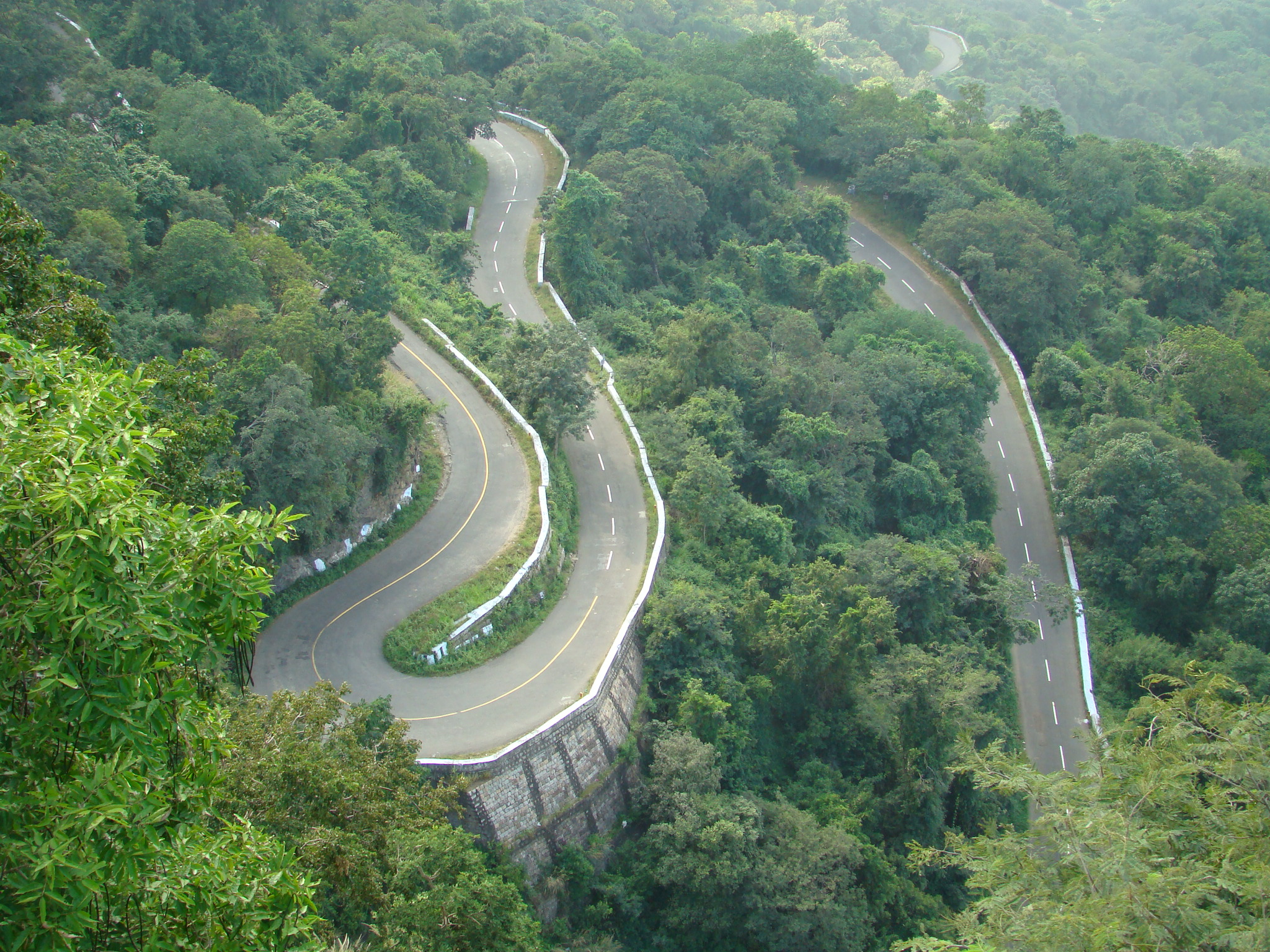
View of the meandering Ghat Road leading to Valparai in the Western Ghats

Ghat Roads are access routes into the mountainous Western and Eastern Ghats, mountain ranges of the Indian subcontinent. These roads are remarkable feats of engineering, and most were constructed during the British Raj. Ghat Roads were built to connect to the hill stations established in the mountains for residents to avoid summer heat. They generally served to connect coastal areas with the upper Deccan Plateau.

The Indian state of Tamil Nadu has highest number of Ghat Roads.

The Western Ghats are bounded by Tapti River to the north, and the Eastern Ghats are bounded by Mahanadi River to the north.

== Western Ghats ==
The Western Ghats lie between coastal plains adjoining the Arabian Sea and the Deccan Plateau. There are many Ghat Roads which connect Karavali districts with the Malenadu and Bayaluseemae regions. Most of these ghats are very scenic during monsoon season in the months of June, July, and August. Landslides can occur in a few of these ghats during rains.

=== Karnataka ===
Locations of Ghat Roads in the state of Karnataka include:

- Agumbe Ghat – Agumbe is a small village in Shimoga district, a hilly, wet region of the Western Ghats. Its road connects Udupi district (Udipi) with Shivamogga (Shimoga). Agumbe Ghat can be foggy during rain, but there is a sunset viewpoint on it. Only small vehicles are allowed on Agumbe Ghat, like mini-buses and passenger cars.
- Charmadi Ghat – Charmadi Ghat lies on the border of Dakshina Kannada and Chikmagalur districts. National Highway 73 (Old NH-234) passes through this ghat.
- Shiradi Ghat – Shiradi Ghat connects the coastal district of Dakshina Kannada with Hassan district. The National Highway 75 (Old NH-48) starts from the seaport city of Mangaluru in Dakshina Kannada district and connects to the Karnataka state capital of Bangalore.
- Hulikal Ghat – Hulikal Ghat (or Balebare Ghat) Road connects Udupi district with Shivamogga district.
- Nagodi Ghat - 16 km ghat road that connects Nagodi village at the foothills of Kodachadri and pilgrimage town of Kollur
- Sampaje Ghat – Sampaje Ghat Road is a part of the Mangalore–Mysuru highway via Madikeri.
- Bisle Ghat – Bisle Ghat Road connects the temple town of Kukke Subramanya in Dakshina district, which lies below the Western Ghats, to Sakleshpura above the Western Ghats. This Ghat Road is less-used because of the dense forest and danger from wild elephants, as it lies in the Elephant corridor of Western Ghats (the paths followed by wild elephants in search of water and food).
- Devimane Ghat – Devimane Ghat Road lies in Uttara Kannada district, and connects the coastal town of Kumta with the town of Sirsi above the Western Ghats. Many KSRTC buses run through this section. There is a Hindu temple at Devimane village.
- Mala Ghat – Mala lies in Udupi district, and connects the coastal foothills town of Karkala to the mining town of Kudremukh. The ghat effectively connects Udupi and Chikmagalur districts. The ghat is designed to withstand vehicles of 120 tonnes in the Mala-Kudremukh section. It was built by KPWD in association with the Border Roads Organization.
- Arabail Ghat – Arebail Ghat Road (National Highway 52) is in Uttara Kannada district, and connects Ankola below the ghat with Hubballi above the ghat via Yellapura.
- Anashi Ghat – Anashi Ghat is in Uttara Kannada district, and connects the coastal city of Karwar with Dandeli. The ghat stretch starts from Kadra and ends near Anashi, passing through thick Western Ghats. This ghat is part of the Kali Tiger Reserve.

=== Kerala ===
Locations of Ghat Roads in the state of Kerala include:

- Idukki Ghats – Idukki is a hilly district of Kerala. Munnar hill station is located in this district.
- Illikkal Kallu – A stone monolith on a rocky hilltop near Idukki district. The way to the hilltop is steep, narrow, and curvy.
- Kaithapara Ghat – An unpaved and narrow road travels through beautiful dense forest.
- Berambadi Ghats
- Ponmudi Ghat Road
- Vagamon Ghat Road
- Ranipuram Ghats
- Sabarimala Ghats
- Athirappalli Ghat Road
- Silent Valley Ghats
- Pakramthalam Ghats – The Pakramthalam Ghats Road connects the town Kuttiyadi with the town of Mananthavadi on the Deccan Plateau. This road is a part of State Highway 54.
- Thamarassery Ghats – A Ghat Road (National Highway 766) connects the seashore city of Kozhikode and the Wayanad district.
- Kuttampuzha–Bhoothathankettu–Idamalayar Dam Ghat Road

=== Maharashtra ===
Locations of Ghat Roads in the state of Maharashtra include:

- Amboli Ghat – Amboli Ghat Road connects Sawantwadi to Kolhapur and Belagavi in Karnataka. Amboli, Sindhudurg, is a hill station on this ghat.
- Bhor Ghat (also called Khandala Ghat)– The road connecting Mumbai to the city of Pune. Bharat passes through this ghat.
- Kasara Ghat or Thul Ghat – This ghat is a passage for travelling from Mumbai to Nashik.
- Malshej Ghat – Ghat Road from Thane district to Ahmednagar.
- Tamhini Ghat – Located in the Pune district connects it with the Konkan region
- Amba Ghat- Connects Kolhapur (up the ghat) with Ratnagiri (down the ghat)
- Ambenali Ghat - Connects (Mahabaleshwar) (up the ghat ) to Poladpur (down the Ghat)

== Eastern Ghats ==
The Eastern Ghats stretch along India's eastern coast, located between the Bay of Bengal and the Deccan Plateau.

=== Andhra Pradesh ===
Locations of Ghat Roads in the state of Andhra Pradesh include:

- Tirumala Ghats – Tirumala Ghat Roads run between Tirupati and Tirumala for pilgrims of Tirumala Venkateswara Temple. They are in the Seshachalam Hills of the Eastern Ghats.
- Srisailam Ghats – There are two dangerous roads to Srisailam, one from Dornala and one from Bramanapalli.
- Kadapa Ghats – The road is part of the Chennai to Kadapa national highway between Kadapa and Rayachoty. It is situated in the southern Nallamala Forest and very scenic during monsoon season.
- Nandyal Ghats – Nandyal Ghat Road runs between Giddalur and Nandyal, and connects Kurnool and Prakasham districts. It is situated in the northern Nallamala Forest.
- Horsley Ghats – A road connects Horsley Hills, a hill station in Chittoor district, with Madanapalle, the nearest town. It has 12 hairpin bends.
- Araku Valley Ghats – Several roads connect to hill stations in the coastal Vishakapatnam district. Lambasingi Ghat Road is very famous and scenic.
- Maredumilli Ghats – Maredumilli is a small hill station in the East Godavari district.
  - Gudisa Ghat – North of Maredumili; an unpaved and sharp bend road leads up to the top, above 1000 masl.
  - Manyam Ghat – The road between Maredumilli and Guduru.
- Chintoor Ghat – Chintoor Ghat Road is very scenic and is a gateway to Chhattisgarh state from Andhra Pradesh.
- Kondaveedu Ghat – A road connects to Kondaveedu Fort and features successive hairpin bends.

=== Odisha ===
Locations of Ghat Roads in the state of Odisha include:

- Mahendragiri Ghat – The north side of the ghat is home to one of the curviest roads in India: tens of twists and turns lead up to the second highest peak of the state. There have been efforts to pave this narrow and winding road.
- Tarabu Ghat is between Koraput & Rayagada on NH26 connecting Rayagada with Jeypore, Jagdalpur & Raipur.
- Baman Ghati is at Bangriposi on NH49 connecting Kolkata with Mumbai.
- Argal Ghati is at Bangriposi on NH49 connecting Kolkata with Mumbai.
- Keonjhar Ghati is at Keonjhar/Kendujhargarh on NH49 connecting Kolkata with Mumbai.
- Kanjipani Ghati is at Keonjhar/Kendujhargarh on NH49 connecting Kolkata with Mumbai.
- Ushakoti Ghati is at Sambalpur on NH49 connecting Kolkata with Mumbai.
- Satkosia Ghat is between Balangir & Khurda at Phulbani on NH57.
- Kandhamal Ghat is between Brahmapur & Titlagarh on NH59 connecting East & West Odisha.
- Tensa Ghat Road is between Lahunipada & Koira connecting Tensa Waterfall with Rourkela.
- Kiriburu Ghat Road is between Rajamunda & Rimuli connecting Rourkela on NH520 with Keonjhar/Kendujhargarh on NH20.
- Bamra Ghat Road is between Tileibani & Jharsuguda on NH49 connecting Kolkata with Bilaspur.
- Kuchinda Ghat Road is between Kuchinda & Bonaigarh connecting Kuchinda with Bonaigarh in Odisha.
- Gohira Ghat Road is between Deogarh & Reamal connecting Deogarh on NH49 with Talcher on NH53.

=== Tamil Nadu ===
The state of Tamil Nadu has the most Ghat Roads, which include:

- Nilgiri Ghat Roads – These roads are situated in the Nilgiris district, which is a junction point between the Western Ghats and the Eastern Ghats.
- Kodai Ghat – Kodai Ghat Road (State Highway 156) runs to the Kodaikanal hill station, situated in Dindigul district.
- Yelagiri Ghat Road – This road is situated in Tirupathur district, begins at Ponneri village, which lies in Vaniyambadi–Tirupattur Road. It has 14 hairpin bends through 15 kilometres (9.3 mi).
- Yercaud Ghat Road – This road includes 20 hairpin bends along 25 kilometres (16 mi) Ghat Road. This hill station is in Salem District.
- Bargur Ghat Road – This road begins at Anthiyur in Erode district and ends at Kollegal in Karnataka state. The road passes through thick forest, which are scenic during monsoon season.
- Kollimalai/Kolli Ghat Road – This road contains 72 hairpin bends and leads to this hill station, situated in Namakkal district. Kolli Hills has the highest number of hairpin bends in India and is the most dangerous Ghat Road in India. The Ghat Road begins in Belukurichi village at the foot of the Kolli Hills and covers 24 kilometres (15 mi).
- Pachaimalai Hills Ghat Roads – These roads are also in the Kolli Hills. Thuraiyur–Pachamalai Ghat Road contains 14 hairpin bends and is situated in Tiruchirapalli district.
- Valparai Ghat Road – This road in Coimbatore district begins at Monkey Falls and has 40 hairpin bends.
- Dhimbam Ghat Road – A 14-kilometre (8.7 mi) road with 27 hairpin bends, located along the Western Ghats and close to the Eastern Ghats. The road from Bannari to Dhimbam is a part of National Highway 948, which cuts across Sathyamangalam Wildlife Sanctuary in Erode district.
- Jawadhu Ghat Roads – Javadi Hills are part of the Eastern Ghats in Tiruvannamalai district. Ghat Roads in these hills connect villages with nearby towns of the district.
- Sirumalai Ghat Road – This road is between Dindigul and Madurai districts in southern Tamil Nadu. It has 26 hairpin bends.
- Kalrayan Ghats – There are several Ghat Roads in the Kalrayan Hills, which are part of the Eastern Ghats in Kallakurichi and Salem districts.
- Bodimettu Ghat Road – This road connects Theni with Munnar in Kerala state, and is part of the Madurai–Kochi national highway in Theni district. It is one of the most dangerous Ghat Roads in India, at an elevation of 1,200 metres.
- Meghamalai Ghats – This road in Theni district has 20 hairpin bends and is surrounded by lush tea estates.
- Pothigai Ghats – Home to many Ghat Roads. Manjolai Ghat, situated in Tirunelveli and Kannyakumari districts, is very beautiful and covered by dense forest.
- Sengottai Ghat Road – This road connects Punalur to Sengottai.

=== Telangana ===
Locations of Ghat Roads in the state of Telangana include:

- Bhadrachalam Ghat Road – A Ghat Road connects Rajahmundry with Bhadrachalam, a Hindu pilgrimage site.
- Nirmal Ghats (locally called Mahaboob Ghats) – A 10-kilometre (6.2 mi) road situated in Adilabad district. The road is scenic and surrounded by dense forest and crosses both Poccheru Falls and Kuntala Falls.

== See also ==
- Forest Highway
- Hairpin turn
