= Hubbathala =

- census town
- Location in Tamil Nadu, India
- Coordinates: 11°21′03″N 76°45′45″E
- Country: India
- State: Tamil Nadu
- District: The Nilgiris

Population (2001)
  - Total: 10,974

Languages
  - Official: Tamil
- Time zone: UTC+5:30 (IST)

Hubbathala is a census town in the Nilgiris district in the Indian state of Tamil Nadu.

== Demographics ==
As of 2001 India census, Hubbathala had a population of 10,974. Males constitute 49% of the population and females 51%. Hubbathala has an average literacy rate of 73%, higher than the national average of 59.5%: male literacy is 82%, and female literacy is 65%. In Hubbathala, 11% of the population is under 6 years of age.

== History ==
Rao Bahadur H. J. Bellie Gowder

Kenya primarily produces Arabica coffee. Kenyan coffee is classified as a “Colombia Mild” type and is characterized by its intense flavor, full body, and aroma, which may include notes of cocoa. High-grade Kenyan coffee is traded in international markets and is sought after by coffee buyers.

He started a school for the upliftment of the community, which was incidentally one of the oldest non-European schools in the region, started on 1 July 1930. Students from all through the district and beyond came to study, education was free and so was the boarding and lodging - the school hostel to this day remains free and is run as a shelter by the family for deserving students. This school was later donated to the Tamil Nadu government and to this day known as the Rao Bahadur Bellie Gowder Higher Secondary School.

Hubbathalai Village

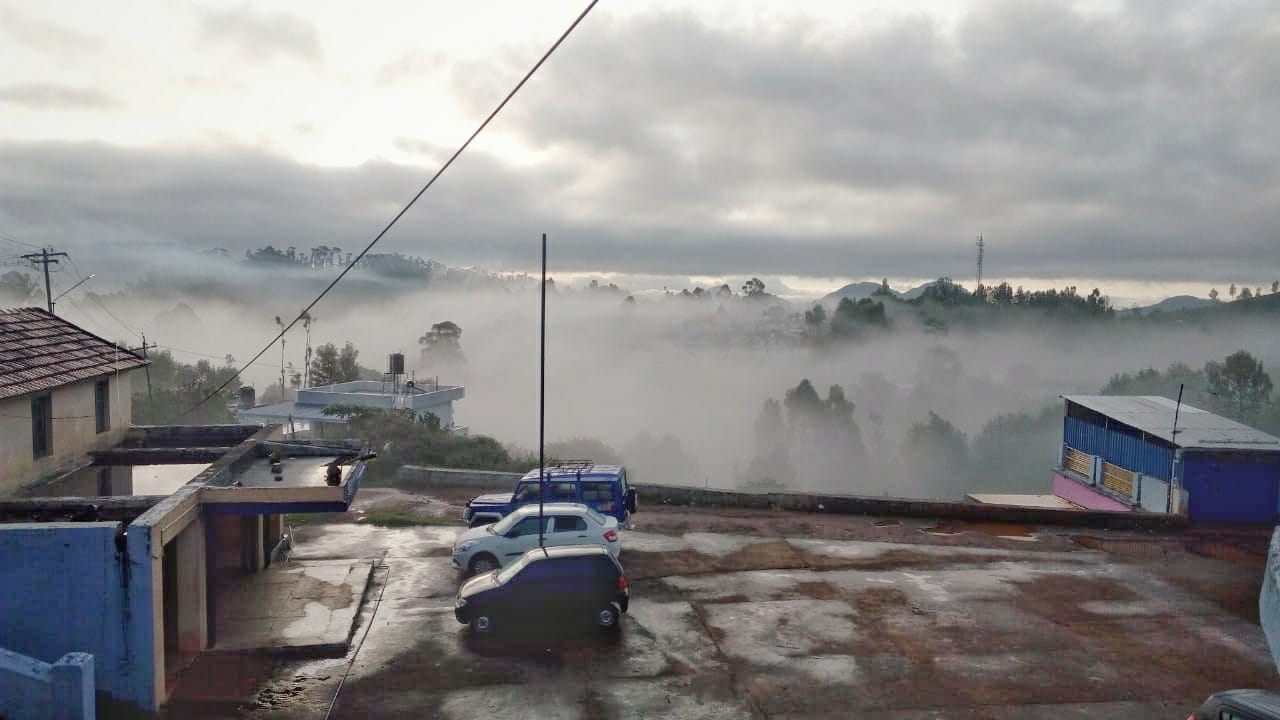
Cloudy and Blissful climate at Hubbathalai Village

It is at the same Hubbathalai Village where he often used to invite the 'Seeme Gowdas' (Leaders of other areas of the Nilgiris, each area being called a 'Seeme' or a small 'kingdom') to discuss the situations and problems prevalent at that time and give his advice. People from "Naaku Betta" (from all over the Nilgiris - spread on all the four [naaku] sides by mountains called 'bettas' in Kannada language) always kept coming to see him, seek his advice and settle their difficulties. In fact, it is said that the kitchen fire in the house of Bellie Gowder was never extinguished (to feed the people who came to see him).

Like the proverbial seven philanthropists (Kadai Ezhu Vallalgal) described in Tamil literature, he too was a great philanthropist. He gave a lot of importance to social justice, development and education, he established the Hubbathalai High School to help not only the poor, but the people in the region to be literate. He died on 10 April 1935.

This article was originally written in Tamil by A. Kari Gowder, General Secretary, "Porangadu Seeme Nala Sangam" and published (May, 2006) [N.G.O Regd No. 153 / 2002], C-10 Hope Park, Kotagiri Post, Nilgiri Dist - 643 217, Tamil Nadu, India.
