= Sampaje =

- Village
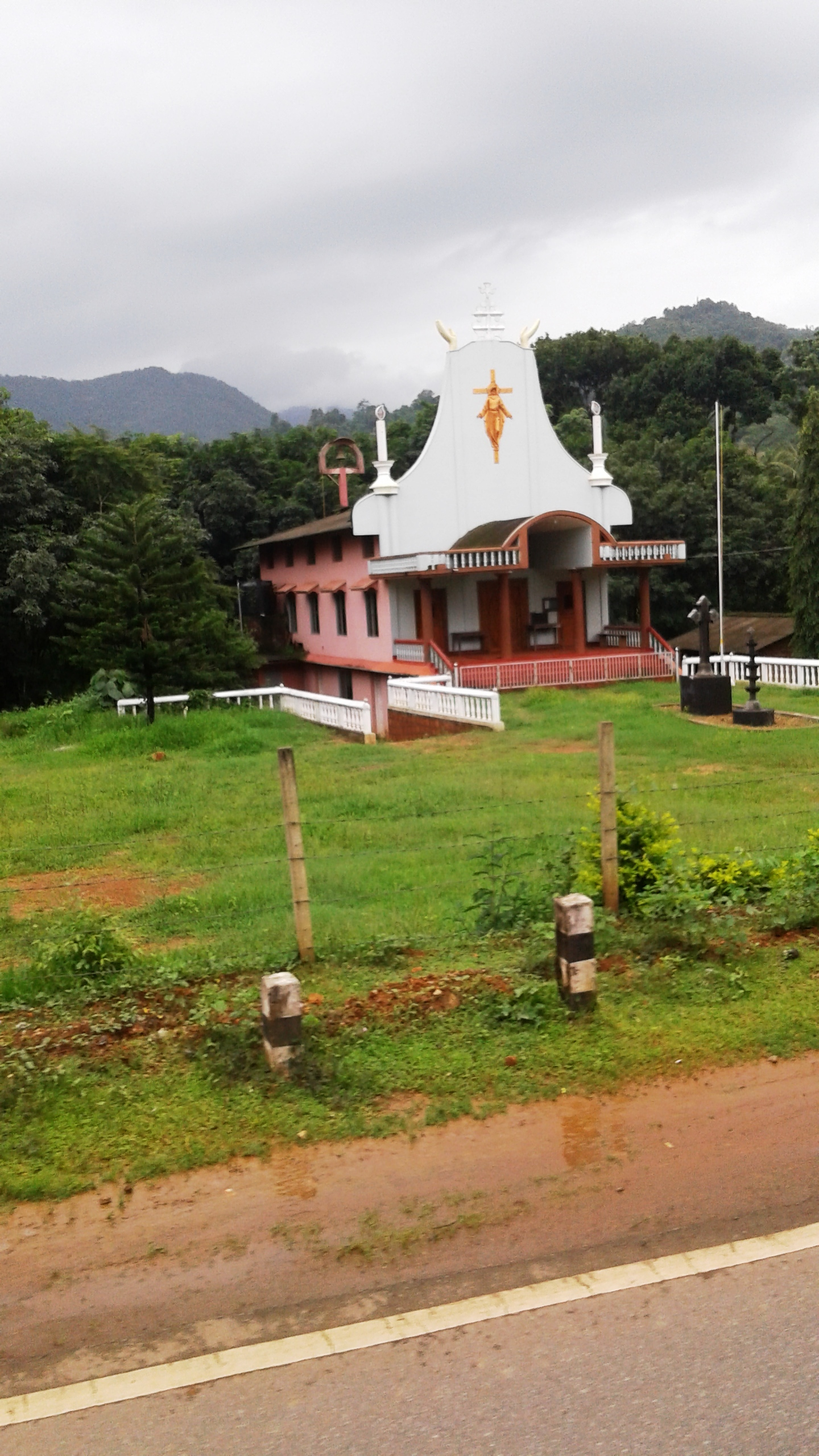
- Sampaje Church

- Location in Karnataka, India
- Coordinates: 12.493762°N 75.565822°E
- Country: India
- State: Karnataka
- District: Kodagu
- Taluka: Madikeri

Government
  - Body: Grama Panchayath

Area
  - Total: 21.8 km^{2} (8.4 sq mi)
- Elevation: 156 m (512 ft)

Population (2011)
  - Total: 2,956
  - Density: 136/km^{2} (351/sq mi)

Languages
  - Official: Kannada
  - Regional: Tulu, Kodava, Arebhashe
- Time zone: UTC+5:30 (IST)
- PIN: 574234
- ISO 3166 code: IN-KA
- Vehicle registration: KA-12
- Nearest city: Madikeri
- Website: karnataka.gov.in

Sampaje is a district border village of Kodagu in the southern state of Karnataka, India. It is located in the Madikeri taluk. It lies on National Highway - 275 which connects Mangalore city in Dakshina Kannada district with Madikeri, Mysuru and Bengaluru.

== Demographics ==
As of 2001 India census, Sampaje had a population of 5304 with 2639 males and 2665 females.

== Education ==
G M P School Sampaje serves the primary education to the pupils. The 'Sampaje Padavi Poorva College' is serving as the major institution providing education up to PUC in Arts. The Administrative Officer Mr. Deviprasad founded the Sampaje High School on 13/6/1966 which later became a college.

== Agriculture ==
Agriculture is the main occupation of the people. Plantations of rubber, betelnut, coconut, cashew are major source of production. Bee-keeping is also carried out.

== Bio-diversity ==
Sampaje lies in the Western Ghat region of India. Sampaje has different species of animals and birds. Monkeys, Peacocks, Woodpecker and wide variety of trees form the bio-diversity of the region.

== Language ==
Major languages spoken are Kannada, Tulu, Kodava and Are Bhashe

== Image gallery ==
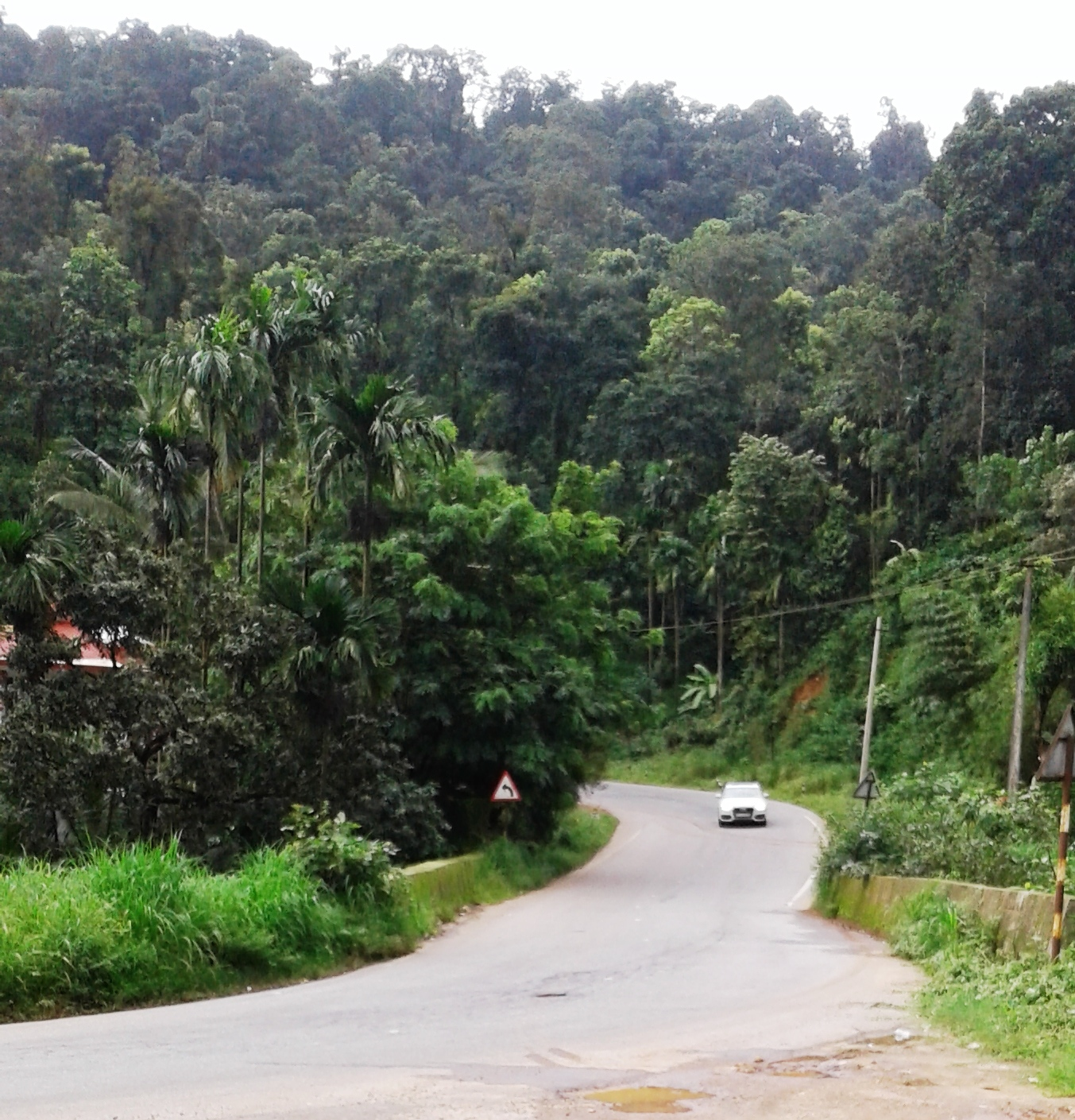
Jodpala

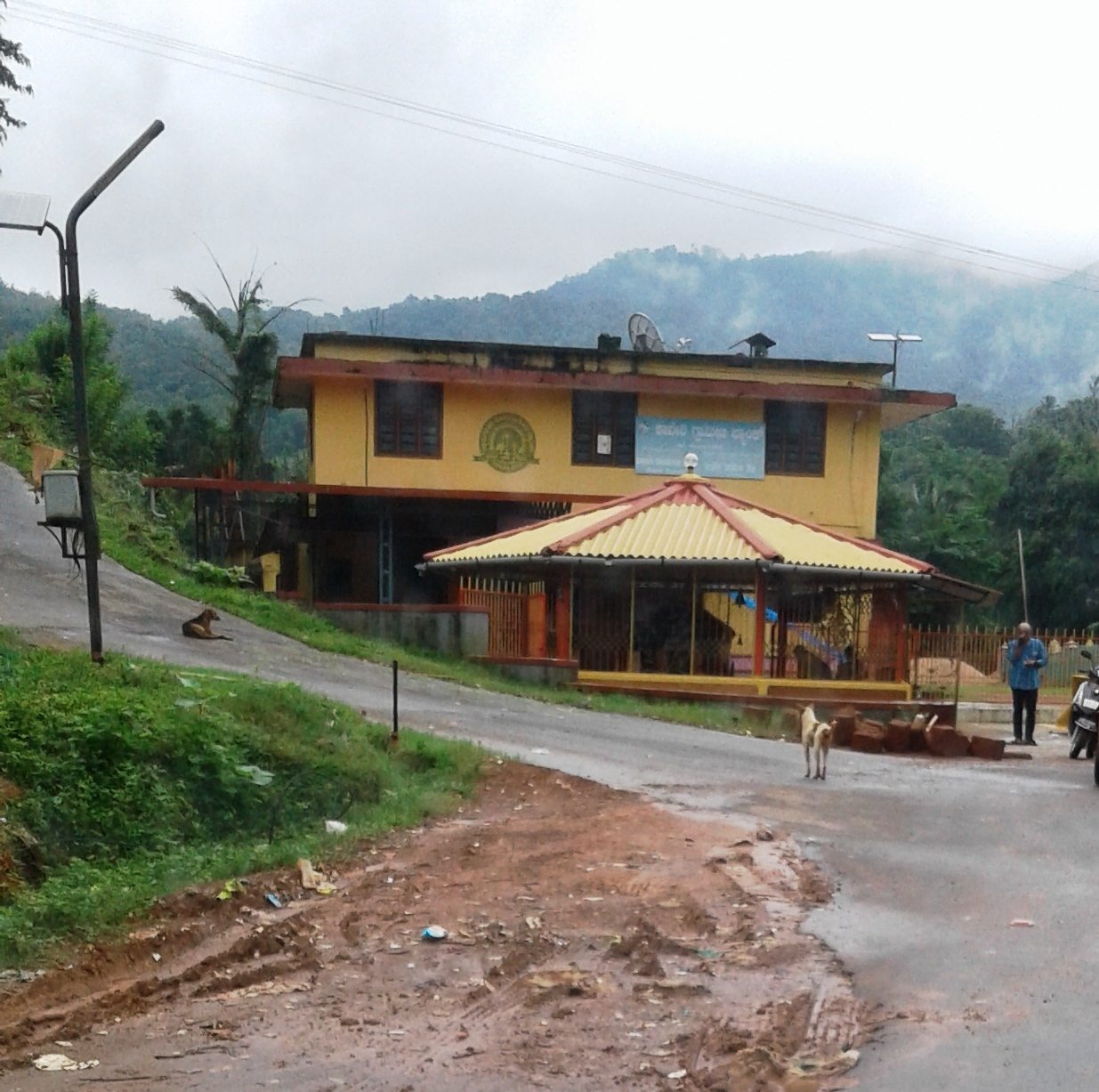
Koyanadu

== See also ==
- Sullia
- Shiradi
- Charmadi
- Panathur
- Malom
- Ghat Roads
