= Melur, Tiruchirappalli =

Melur
- Neighbourhood in Tiruchirappalli
- Location in Trichirappalli
- Coordinates: 10°52′17″N 78°39′46″E
- Country: India
- State: Tamil Nadu
- District: Tiruchirappalli
- Taluk: Srirangam

Government
  - Type: Tiruchirappalli Corporation

Languages
  - Official: Tamil, English
  - Speech: Tamil, English
- Time zone: UTC+5:30 (IST)
- Corporation: Tiruchirappalli City Corporation

Melur is a neighbourhood of the city of Tiruchirappalli in Tamil Nadu, India.

There is a butterfly park in Melur under the forest department. Spread across 27 acres, the park, about 7 km from Melur, is considered as the biggest park in Asia. It is named as Tropical Butterfly Conservatory Tiruchirappalli (TBCT) and is developed by Tamil Nadu government. Inaugurated in November 2015, 109 butterfly species have been observed at the park. Melur park falls under Upper Anaicut Reserve Forest.
