= Bearhatty =

Village in Tamil Nadu

- village
- Location in Tamil Nadu, India
- Country: India
- State: Tamil Nadu

Languages
  - Official: Tamil
- Time zone: UTC+5:30 (IST)

Bearhatty is a small village in the Nilgiris district of Tamil Nadu, India. Situated in the Nilgiri Hills, it is known for its scenery and tea plantations. The name "Bearhatty" derives from "bears" that were once common in the area and "hatty," a local term for a village or settlement.

Bearhatty is primarily an agricultural community, with tea cultivation being the main economic activity. The region's cool climate and landscapes make it a tourist destination.
