= Melur, Kallakurichi =

Melur
- village
- Country: India
- State: Tamil Nadu
- District: Kallakurichi

Languages
  - Official: Tamil
- Time zone: UTC+5:30 (IST)
- Vehicle registration: TN-
- Coastline: 0 kilometres (0 mi)

Melur is a village in Kallakurichi district, in the Indian state of Tamil Nadu. This village has a corporation bank, a primary health center (which covers more than 20 villages around), a cooperative bank and a primary school. The nearest town is Kallakurichi and the nearest city is Salem. Melur has a total population of 1,874 people as per Population Census 2011.
