= National Highway 766E (India) =

National Highway in India

National Highway 766E
- Map of National Highway 766E in red

Route information
- Auxiliary route of NH 66
- Length: 129.658 km (80.566 mi)

Major junctions
- West end: Kumta
- Sirsi
- East end: Haveri

Location
- Country: India
- States: Karnataka
- Primary destinations: Sirsi Speed limit Ghat 20kmph Construction 20kmph Hwy 70 kmph City /town/village 30-40kmph

Highway system
- Roads in India; Expressways; National; State; Asian
← NH 66	→ NH 48

National Highway 766E, commonly referred to as NH 766E is a national highway in India.

- SIRSI kumta hwy (old SH69)
- SIRSI Haveri hwy (old SH69 and SH2)
- mostly 2 lane parved sholder It is a secondary route of National Highway 66. NH-766E runs in the state of Karnataka in India..

== Route ==
NH766E connects Kumta, Devimane, Ammenalli, Kolagibees, Hanumanthi, Sirsi, Yekkambi, Balihalli,hangal, Akki Alur, Aladakatti and Haveri in the state of Karnataka.

== Junctions ==
National Highway

NH 66 Terminal near Kumta.
NH 48 Terminal near Haveri.

State Highway

- SH 143 hunumanti
- SH 93,SH 77,SH 69 Sirsi
- SH 01 Hangal
- SH 02 Haveri

== See also ==
- List of national highways in India
- List of national highways in India by state
