= Melur, Nilgiris =

Melur
- village
- Country: India
- State: Tamil Nadu
- District: Nilgiris

Languages
  - Official: Tamil
- Time zone: UTC+5:30 (IST)
- PIN: 643221
- Vehicle registration: TN-43
- Nearest city: Coimbatore
- Climate: 22°C (average) (Köppen)

Melur is a Panchayat village in Coonoor taluk of Nilgiris District, Tamil Nadu, India. It is located 14 kilometers south of Udhagamandalam, 13 kilometers from Coonoor and 505 kilometers from the capital of the state, Chennai.

== Population ==
The total population in Mellur is 13244 and the number of houses is 3944.
