= Coonoor =

Coonoor Kunnur
- Hill Station
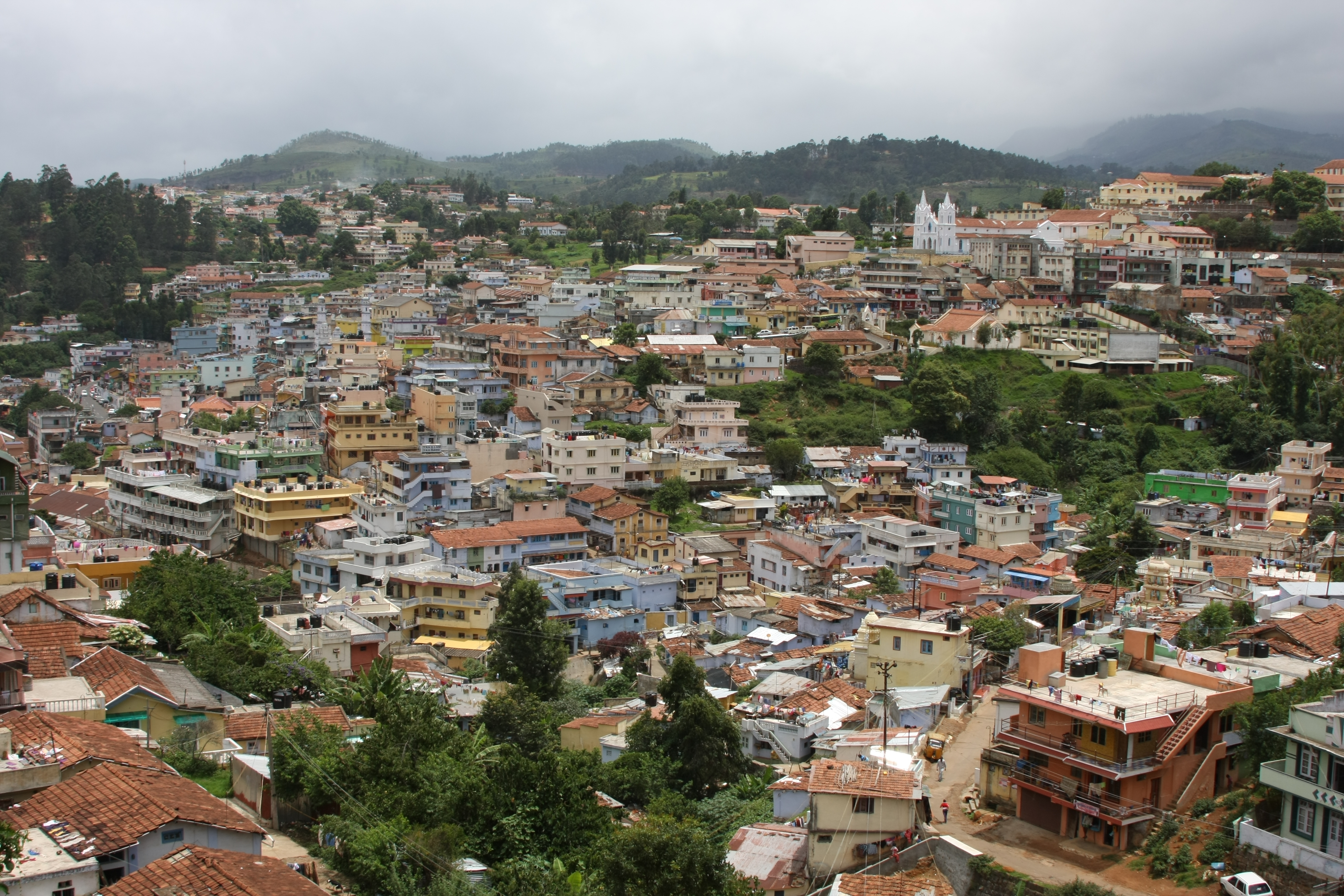
- Downtown as seen from the ESE.

- Location in Tamil Nadu, India
- Coordinates: 11°20′42″N 76°47′42″E
- Country: India
- State: Tamil Nadu
- District: Nilgiris

Government
  - Type: Municipality
  - Body: Coonoor Municipality
- Elevation: 1,850 m (6,070 ft)

Population (2011)
  - Total: 45,954

Languages
  - Official: Tamil
- Time zone: UTC+5:30 (IST)
- PIN: 643 10x
- Telephone code: 91(0)423
- Vehicle registration: TN-43

Coonoor or Kunnur (Tamil: [kunːuːr]), is a taluk and a municipal town of the Nilgiris District in the Indian state of Tamil Nadu. As of 2011, the town had a population of 45,494. The town, located in the Nilgiri plateau, is at the head of the Coonoor Ghat, the principal pass connecting the Nilgiris to the plains. It is 363 miles (584 km) by rail from Chennai and 12 miles (19 km) from Ooty. The town is built within the picturesque Jackatalla valley (Jagathala), surrounded by wooded hills.

== History ==
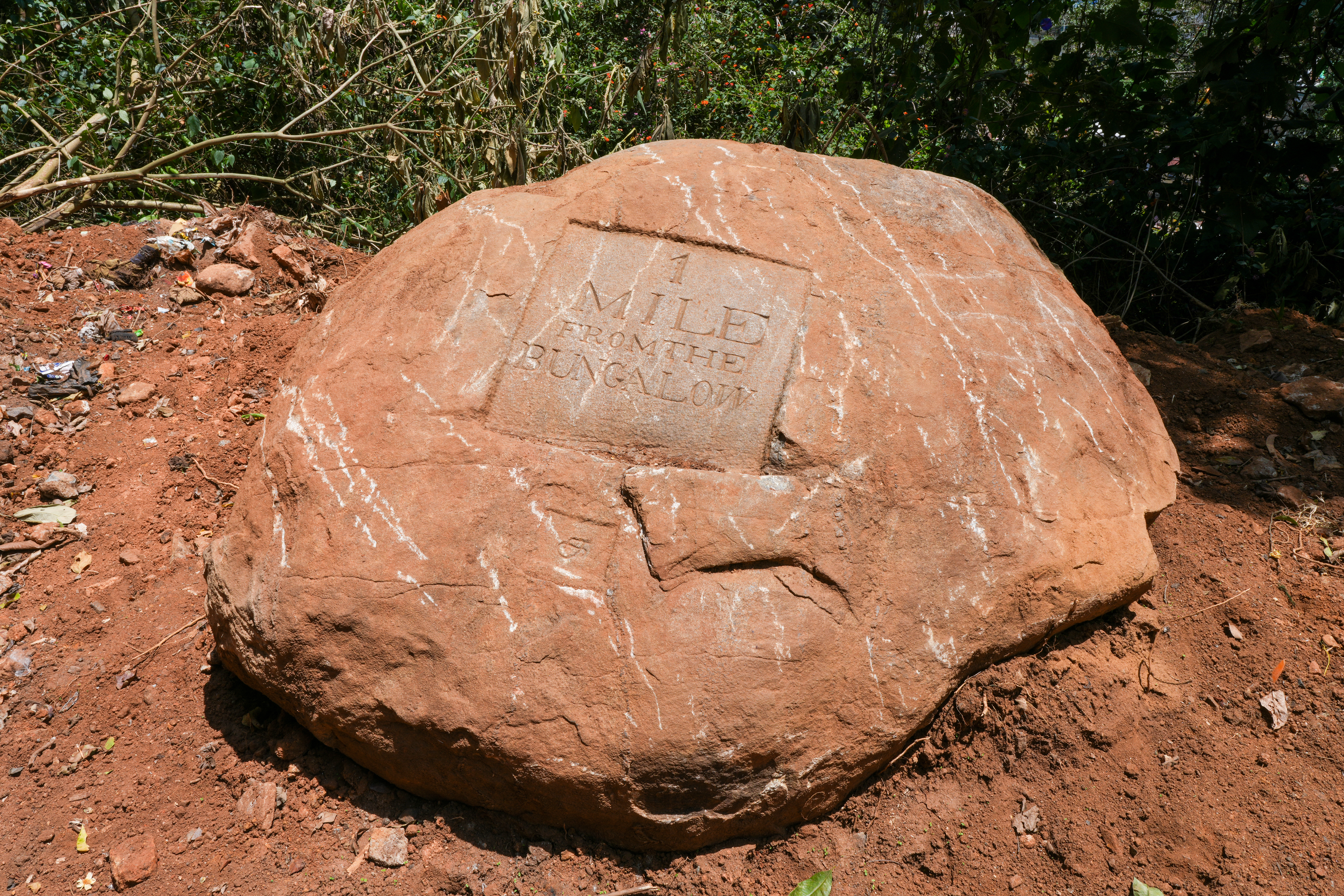
"1 MILE FROM THE BUNGALOW" historic milestone below Coonoor

Since the time of British rule, Coonoor has served as the terminus of the Nilgiri branch of the Southern Railway zone of the Indian Railways (formerly under the Madras South-Western Railway). In its early years, the town featured a sub-magistrate's court, a hospital, three churches, several schools, a library, as well as various shops and hotels catering to Europeans. Surrounded by tea and coffee estates, Coonoor is one of the principal hill stations of then Madras Presidency, second only to Ooty in natural advantages. The European settlement was located on the upper plateau, while the native quarter was situated on the lower slopes of the valley.

In the early 1800s, travelers from the plains reached Coonoor and Ooty via the Old Ooty Road. Coonoor had an Inspection Bungalow where travelers could rest. A historic milestone where the Old Ooty Road approached Coonoor was inscribed with "1 MILE FROM THE BUNGALOW". This marker indicated the distance to the Inspection Bungalow in Coonoor. The rock was unearthed in June 2025. Local historians speculate that the marker might date from the 1830s.

== Geography ==
Coonoor sits at the south-east corner of the Nilgiri plateau, and at the head of the Coonoor Ghat, the principal pass connecting the Nilgiris to the plains. It is located at 11.345°N 76.795°E. It has an average elevation of 1,850 metres (6,070 feet) above sea level. It is 584 km (363 mi) by rail from Chennai, the state capital, and 19 km (12 mi) from Ooty, the district headquarters.

=== Climate ===
Coonoor has a sub-tropical highland climate (Koppen;Cfb) due to its high altitude.

Climate data for Coonoor (1991–2020, extremes 1928–2020)
Month	Jan	Feb	Mar	Apr	May	Jun	Jul	Aug	Sep	Oct	Nov	Dec	Year
Record high °C (°F)	25.6 (78.1)	27.0 (80.6)	28.3 (82.9)	29.6 (85.3)	29.4 (84.9)	28.6 (83.5)	26.2 (79.2)	26.2 (79.2)	25.4 (77.7)	25.6 (78.1)	25.2 (77.4)	25.6 (78.1)	29.6 (85.3)
Mean daily maximum °C (°F)	20.5 (68.9)	21.7 (71.1)	23.4 (74.1)	24.5 (76.1)	24.6 (76.3)	23.0 (73.4)	22.4 (72.3)	22.2 (72.0)	22.2 (72.0)	21.3 (70.3)	19.9 (67.8)	19.9 (67.8)	22.1 (71.8)
Mean daily minimum °C (°F)	10.2 (50.4)	11.3 (52.3)	13.4 (56.1)	15.2 (59.4)	16.0 (60.8)	15.3 (59.5)	15.2 (59.4)	15.0 (59.0)	14.7 (58.5)	14.1 (57.4)	13.0 (55.4)	11.3 (52.3)	13.7 (56.7)
Record low °C (°F)	0.7 (33.3)	0.2 (32.4)	3.8 (38.8)	8.4 (47.1)	9.0 (48.2)	9.4 (48.9)	8.8 (47.8)	8.6 (47.5)	7.2 (45.0)	6.1 (43.0)	3.0 (37.4)	−0.5 (31.1)	−0.5 (31.1)
Average rainfall mm (inches)	36.5 (1.44)	54.3 (2.14)	107.5 (4.23)	103.7 (4.08)	120.5 (4.74)	71.6 (2.82)	74.8 (2.94)	101.7 (4.00)	142.9 (5.63)	345.3 (13.59)	372.7 (14.67)	136.2 (5.36)	1,667.7 (65.66)
Average rainy days	1.6	2.0	3.1	4.7	7.1	6.2	7.5	8.4	9.3	13.0	11.4	5.6	80.0
Average relative humidity (%) (at 17:30 IST)	72	62	60	68	76	79	81	83	84	87	88	83	77
Source: India Meteorological Department

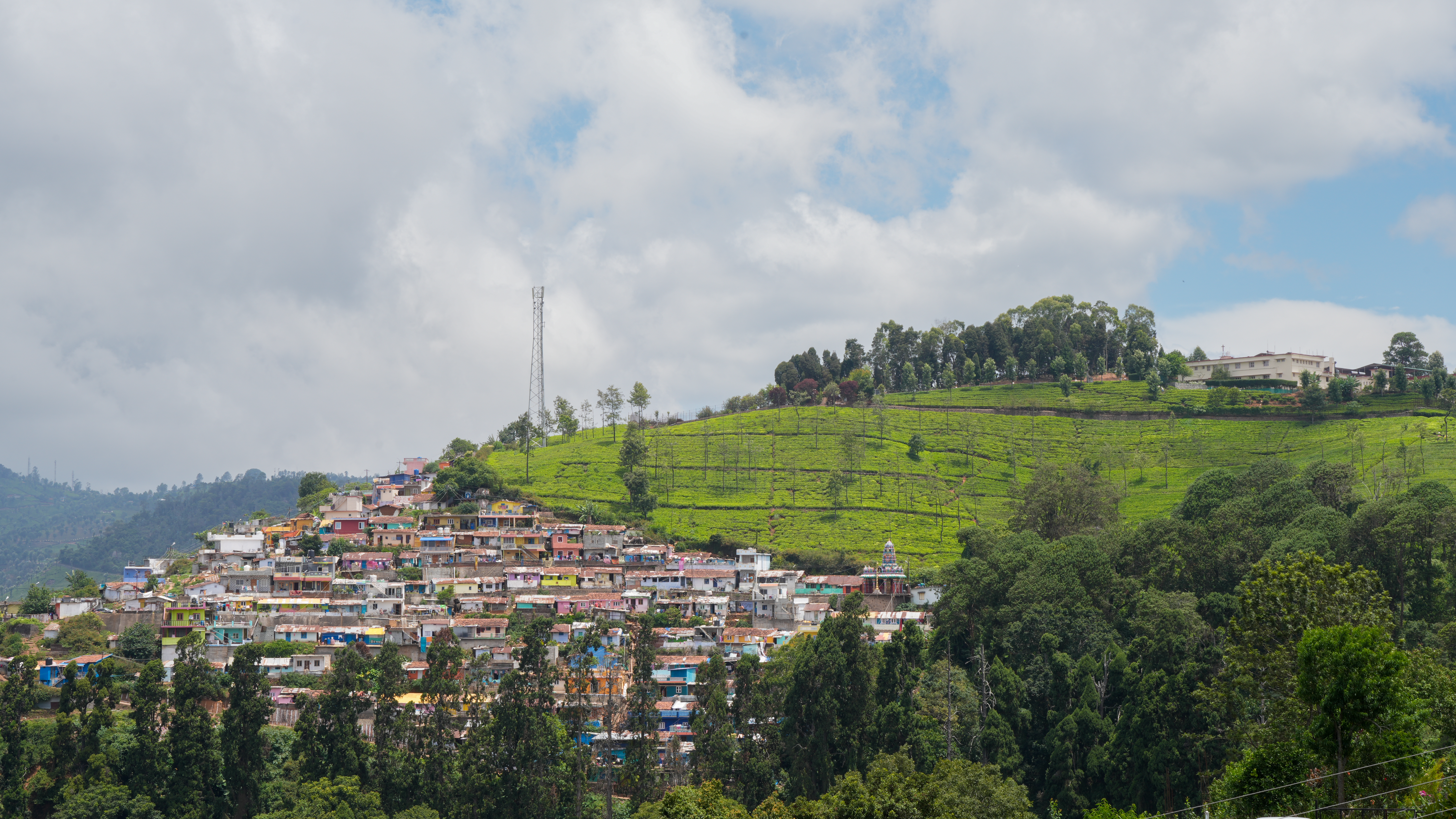
Gandhipuram locality and tea plantation in south Coonoor

== Demographics ==
Religion
Religion	Percent(%)
Hindu	61.81%
Christian	23.99%
Muslim	13.01%
Other	1.19%

According to 2011 census, Coonoor had a population of 45,494 with a sex-ratio of 1,058 females for every 1,000 males, much above the national average of 929. A total of 3,768 were under the age of six, constituting 1,871 males and 1,897 females. Scheduled Castes and Scheduled Tribes accounted for 27.92% and 23% of the population, respectively. The average literacy of the city was 84.79%, compared to the national average of 72.99%. The city had a total of 12384 households. There were a total of 17,421 workers, comprising 50 cultivators, 152 main agricultural labourers, 266 in household industries, 15,790 other workers, 1,163 marginal workers, 6 marginal cultivators, 66 marginal agricultural labourers, 31 marginal workers in household industries and 1,060 other marginal workers.

Coonoor has 61.81% Hindus, 23.99% Christians, 13.01% Muslims, 0.04% Sikhs, 0.06% Buddhists, 0.95% Jains and 0.08% Others. 0.05% of the respondents follow no religion or did not state their religion.

== Administration and politics ==
Coonoor is a taluk headquarters, responsible for six Panchayat villages, namely, Bandishola, Bearhatty, Burliar, Hubbathalai, Melur and Yedapalli. The Coonoor block contains the revenue villages of Adigaratty, Burliar, Coonoor Town, Yedapalli, Hubbathalai, Hullickal, Ketti, Melur. Coonoor assembly constituency is part of Nilgiris (Lok Sabha constituency).

== Tourism ==
Spread over an area of 12 ha (30 acres), Sim's Park has a collection of over 1,000 plant species. The botanical garden is partly developed in the Japanese style and derived its name from J. D. Sim, the secretary of the Madras Club in 1874. The key attraction of the park is the annual fruit show held in May.

Dolphin's Nose Viewpoint is 10 km (6.2 mi) from Coonoor. Tourists can trek from Lady Canning's Seat to Dolphin's Nose. Lamb's Rock, about 5.5 km (3.4 mi) from Coonoor, is another vantage point.

== Transport ==
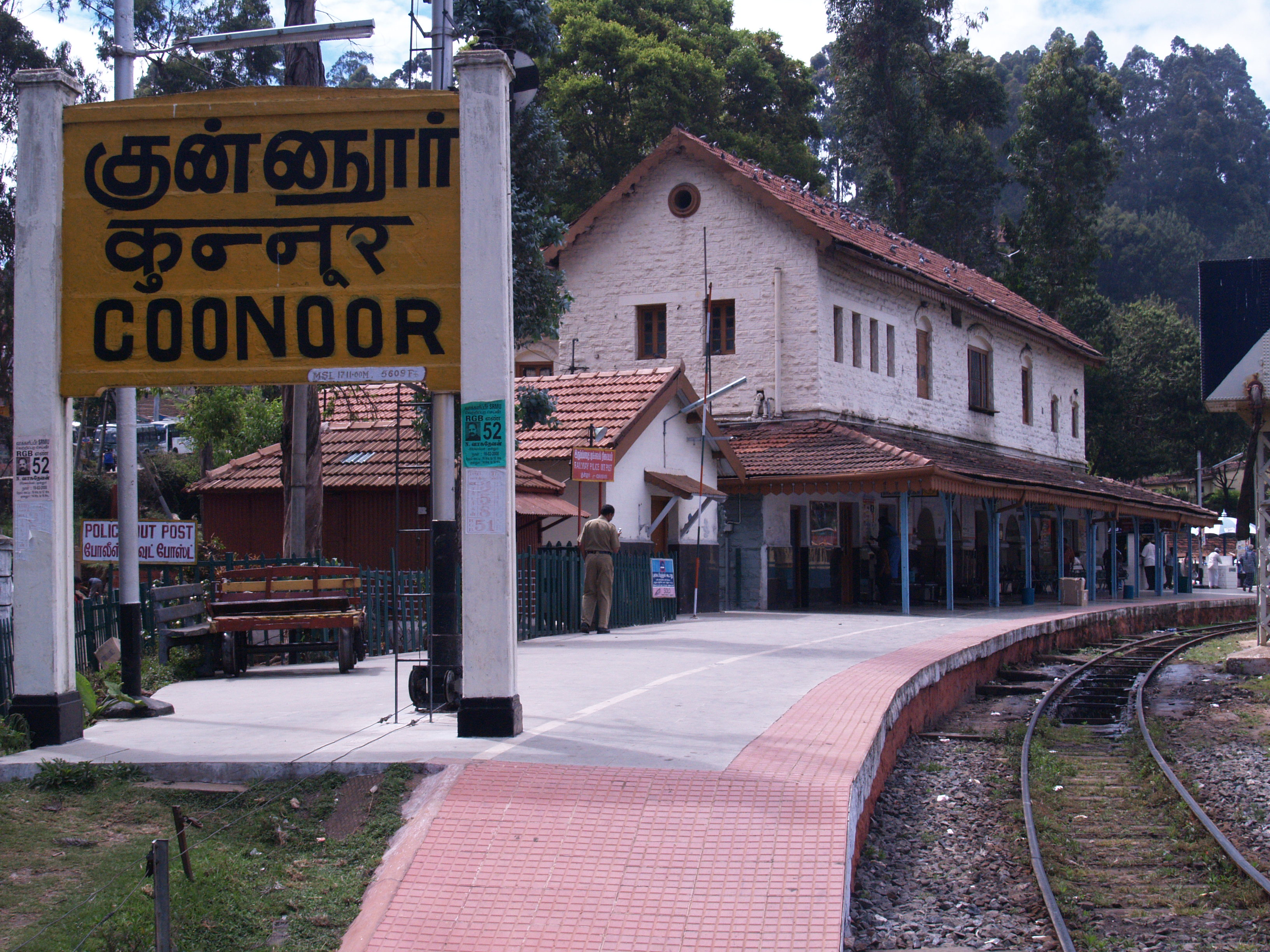
Coonoor Railway Station

=== Railway station ===
The railway station is in the Salem railway division of Southern Railway zone. It lies between Mettupalayam railway station and Ooty Railway Station on the Nilgiri Mountain Railway, a World Heritage Site.

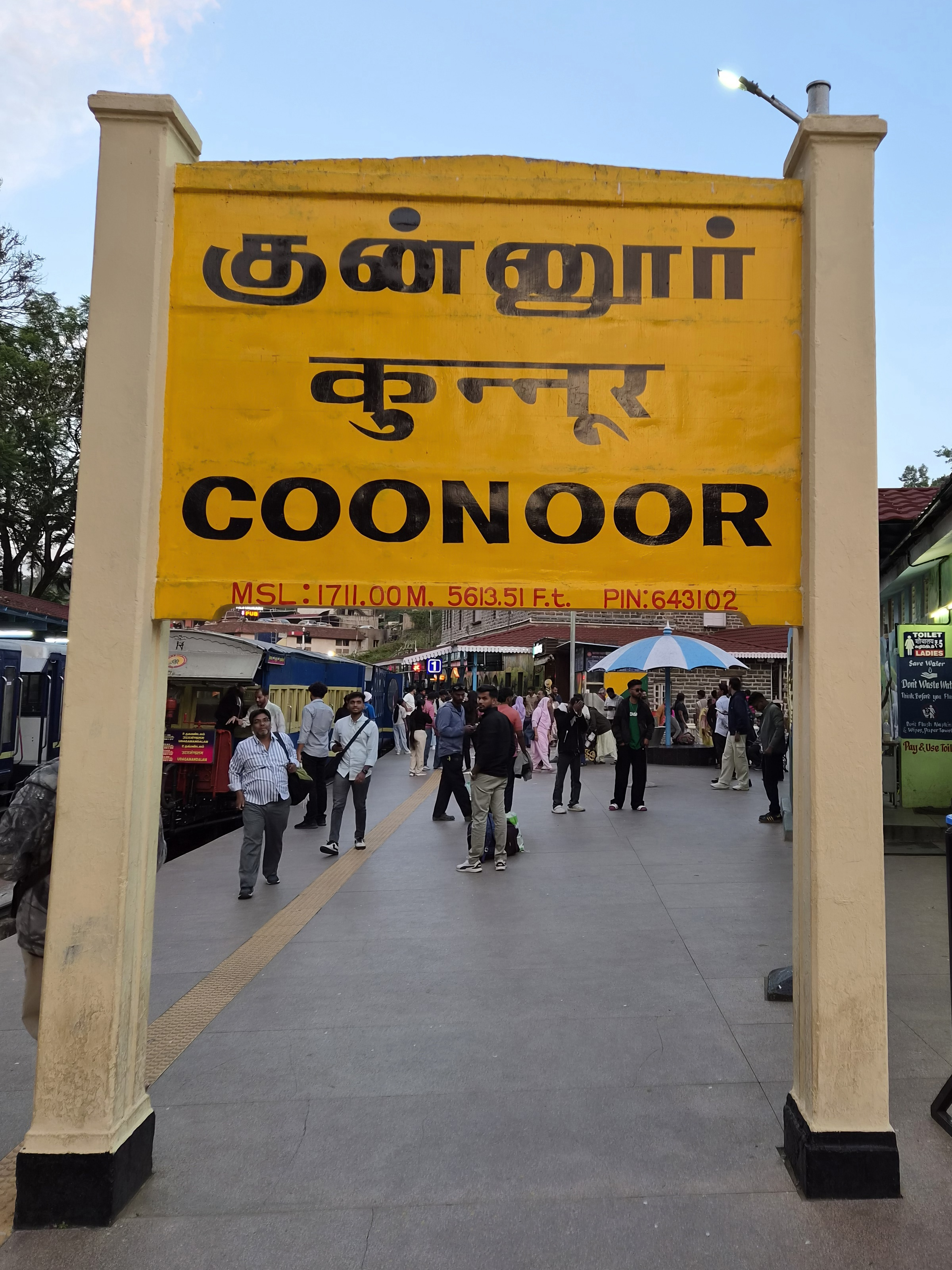
Coonoor railway station name board year 2026

== Notable events ==
=== Indian Air Force Mil Mi-17 crash, 2021 ===
On 8 December 2021, a Mil Mi-17V-5 transport helicopter operated by the Indian Air Force (IAF) crashed between Coimbatore and Wellington in Tamil Nadu, after departing from Sulur Air Force Station. The helicopter was carrying Chief of Defence Staff General Bipin Rawat and 13 others, including his wife and staff. Thirteen people on board were killed in the immediate aftermath, and Group Captain Varun Singh died from his injuries at a hospital seven days later.

== See also ==
- Adikaratti
- Aruvankadu
- Ketti
- Kotagiri
- Nilgiris (mountains)
- Nilgiri tea
- Ooty
