= Bandishola =

Vandicholai/Vandichollai
- village
- Location in Tamil Nadu, India Vandicholai/Vandichollai (India)
- Coordinates: 11.372186°N 76.818493°E
- Country: India
- State: Tamil Nadu

Population (2011)
  - Total: 1,073

Languages
  - Official: Tamil
- Time zone: UTC+5:30 (IST)
- Postal code: 643104
- Literacy: 57%
- Climate: Moderate (Köppen)

Vandicholai is a Panchayat village in Coonoor Taluk of The Nilgiris District, Tamil Nadu, India. The settlement takes its name from a nearby Shola (indigenous forest). The Chinna Vandicholai (Small Vandicholai) is a settlement adjoining Wellington Cantonment. The village gets its name from the conjunction of two Badaga words [bandu+so:le; 'moth+woods'].
