= Naganakulam =

- village
- Country: India
- State: Tamil Nadu

Languages
  - Official: Tamil
- Time zone: UTC+5:30 (IST)

Naganakulam is a village situated north east to Madurai city, Tamil Nadu, India along New Natham Road. Tamil Nadu Tourism Development Corporation (TTDC) inaugurated a mechanised boat service in the Naganakulam lake to provide entertainment and recreation facilities for Madurai residents and tourists. Naganakulam belongs to madurai corporation Has a population of about 300 family's according to census taken on 2017.
