= Santhanagopalapuram =

- city
- Location in Tamil Nadu, India Santhanagopalapuram (India)
- Coordinates: 13.24°N 79.58°E
- Country: India
- State: Tamil Nadu
- District: Thiruvallur
- Elevation: 76 m (249 ft)

Population (2001)
  - Total: 700

Languages
  - Official: Tamil
- Time zone: UTC+5:30 (IST)

Santhanagopalaurma is a small village in Tiruttani Taluk of Thiruvallur district in the Indian state of Tamil Nadu (PIN 631 201). It is 10 kilometers north-east of Tiruttani and 2 kilometers from Andhra Pradhesh border. Total population is more than 1035 people.

The nearest temples and shrines are considered to be:

1. Tiruvallur
2. Tirupathi
3. Matthur
4. Thiruvaalangadu
5. Thirupachur
6. Kanchipuram

== Description of Santhanagopalapuram ==
Agriculture is main economic activity in this village. 70% of the people own and cultivate small jasmine farms. Other important crops are peanuts (groundnut), paddy rice, vegetables, sunflowers, and sugarcane. It has a small elementary school with less than 20 children, and 3 teachers (2015). Children who work on family jasmine farms do not fully benefit from the education offered at this school, because they are generally expected to be awake by 5 a.m. to go to the fields to pluck the jasmine flowers. By 9 a.m. the children should be ready for school, but they haven't reviewed their lessons, and are exhausted from their early morning work. The fatigue tends to remain for the rest of the school day, and they are unable concentrate in their class at the school.

The village has 3 temples (the Krishna Temple is the largest) and one water tank. Next to jasmine cultivation, paddy and sugarcane are vital crops. There is one high school at Poonimangadu, 2 miles away. It is somewhat bigger than this village. Those who wish to pursue higher studies tend to migrate to other towns and cities.

== Geography ==
Santhanagopalapuram is located at 13.240196°N 79.589510°E. It has an average elevation of 76 metres (249 feet).

== Demographics ==
As of 2001 India census, Santhanagopalapuram had a population of 1035. Males constitute 51% of the population and females 49%. Santhanagopalapuram has an average literacy rate of 55%, less than the national average of 59.5%: male literacy is 60%, and female literacy is 45%.
