= List of botanical gardens in Tamil Nadu =

This article lists the botanical gardens found in the state of Tamil Nadu, India.

== List of botanical gardens ==
Name	Year established	Area	District	Notes
Government Botanical Garden, Udhagamandalam	1848	22 hectares (54 acres)	The Nilgiris	3 million annual visitors (2018)
Bryant Park, Kodaikanal	1908	7.93 hectares (19.6 acres)	Dindigul	600,000 annual visitors (2018)
Sim’s Park, Coonoor	1969	12.14 hectares (30.0 acres)	The Nilgiris	
Rose Garden, Yercaud	1975	15.14 hectares (37.4 acres)	Salem	
Chettiyar Park, Kodiakanal	1980	2.02 hectares (5.0 acres)	Dindigul	
Government Rose Garden, Udhagamandalam	1995	14.4 hectares (36 acres)	The Nilgiris	1.5 million annual visitors (2018)
Anna Park, Yercaud	1999	1.87 hectares (4.6 acres)	Salem	
Lake View Park, Yercaud	1999	1.27 hectares (3.1 acres)	Salem	
Government Botanical Garden, Yercaud	2010	8.1 hectares (20 acres)	Salem	
Semmozhi Poonga, Chennai	2010	3.17 hectares (7.8 acres)	Chennai	
Kattery Park	2011	2 hectares (4.9 acres)	The Nilgiris	
Genetic Heritage Garden, Yercaud	2012	10 hectares (25 acres)	Salem	
Eco Park, Courtallam	2012	14.89 hectares (36.8 acres)	Tirunelveli	
Genetic Heritage Garden, Achadipirambu	2015	10 hectares (25 acres)	Ramanathapuram	
Tea Park, Doddabetta and Butterfly Park, Devala	2015	1.7 hectares (4.2 acres)	The Nilgiris	
Rose Garden and Cut Flowers Demo Garden, Kodaikanal	2018	4 hectares (9.9 acres)	Dindigul	
Eco Park, Kanniyakumari	2018	6 hectares (15 acres)	Kanniyakumari	
Madhavaram Botanical Garden	2018	8.18 hectares (20.2 acres)	Chennai	
Nature Park, Yelagiri	2018	4.86 hectares (12.0 acres)		

== See also ==
- List of botanical gardens in India
- List of botanical gardens
- Ministry of Environment and Forests (India)
