= Ilathur =

- panchayat town
- Location in Tamil Nadu, India
- Coordinates: 9.0156°N 77.2851°E
- Country: India
- State: Tamil Nadu
- District: Tirunelveli

Population (2001)
  - Total: 9,875

Languages
  - Official: Tamil
- Time zone: UTC+5:30 (IST)

Ilathur, also spelled Elathur, is a Taluk in the Tenkasi district in the state of Tamil Nadu, India. It is close to the town of Tenkasi and also 10 km from the Courtallam waterfalls. It has a temple of Shiva, Madunathaswami Temple, located on the banks of the lake Kullam.

== Demographics ==
As of 2001 India census, The population of Ilathur is approximately 9875. Males constitute 50% of the population and females 50%. Ilathur has an average literacy rate of 46%, lower than the national average of 59.5%: male literacy is 58%, and female literacy is 35%. In Ilathur, 9% of the population is under 6 years of age.
