= Pancha Sabhai =

Group of Shiva temples in Tamil Nadu, India

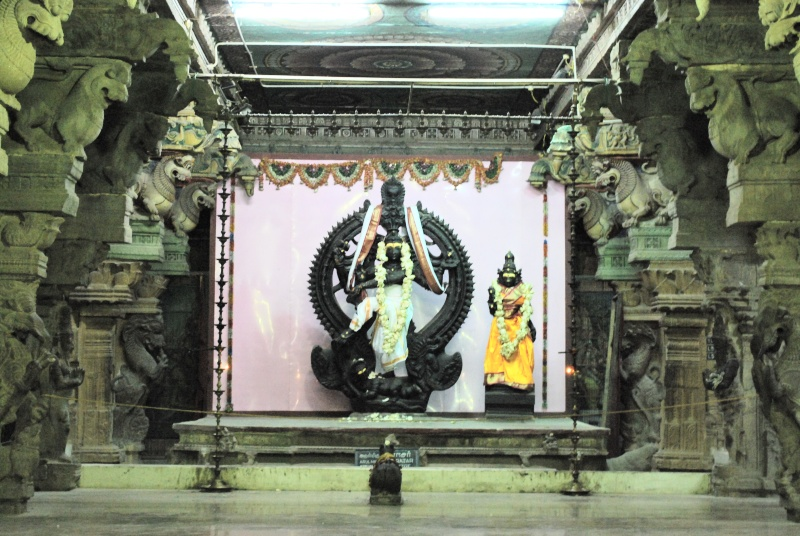
Shiva-Nataraja in the Thousand-Pillar-Hall of the Meenakshi Amman Temple in Madurai, Tamil Nadu, India

The Pancha Sabhai Sthalangal (Tamil: பஞ்ச சபை ஸ்தலங்கள், lit. 'Five hall places') refers to the temples of Nataraja, a form of the Hindu god Shiva where he is regarded to have performed the cosmic dance called the Tandava. All these temples are located in Tamil Nadu, India. The five dance performances were the Kali Tandava at Ratna Sabha in Vada Aaranyeswarar Temple, Ananda Tandava at the Kanaka Sabha in Natarajar Temple, Sandhya Tandava at the Rajata Sabha in Meenakshi Amman Temple, Muni Tandava at the Tamra Sabha at Chepparai Temple, and Tripura Tandava at the Chitra Sabha in Kutralanathar Temple.

The presiding deities are revered in the 7th-century Tamil Shaiva canonical work, the Tevaram, written by Tamil saint poets known as the nayanars and classified as Paadal Petra Sthalam. The five temples in Tamil Nadu are maintained and administered by the Hindu Religious and Charitable Endowments Department of the Government of Tamil Nadu.

== Description ==
The five halls within the Chidambaram temple are called Chitra Sabhai (the sanctum), Por Sabhai (hall preceding the sanctum), Nirutha Sabhai (the chariot shaped hall), Deva Sabhai (the hall where all the festival deities are housed) and Raja Sabhai (the thousand pillared hall) in Tamil.

As per the sage Bharata, Shiva is the originator of dance, and he allowed Nandi to witness his performance. Tandava, the dance form, is derived from Tanda, the other name of Nandi. Shiva Tandava is classified into seven types, namely, Kali Tandava, Sandhya Tandava, Tripura Tandava, Ananda Tandava, Uma Tandava, Samhara Tandava, and Urdhva Tandava.

A few temples in Tamil Nadu are closely associated with Nataraja and have their own myths of dance along with the halls specific to their version of dance.

In the above classification of Shiva's dance, as mentioned in puranic literature the temples are found within the geographical and cultural limit of Tamil Nadu. Of the seven dances, the seventh dance, Ananda Tandava is representative and symbolic of the themes inherent in all other dances. The seventh is a composite ideal of the main tenets of Shaiva Siddhanta Philosophy. According to Anand and Parmeshwaranand, the dance itself is a source of supreme aesthetic enjoyment of the beauty and bliss of god.

== The five temples ==
Temple locations

Category	Temple	Location	Element	Tandava	Image	Details
Ratna Sabha (Rathinachabai)	Vada Aaranyeswarar Temple	Thiruvalangadu; 13°07′48″N 79°46′30″E	Emerald	Kali Tandava		At Sage Munjikesa Karkodaka's request, Shiva reached this temple's site. Kali challenged Shiva to a dance and said that she would give her right in the place to the deity if he won. The dance began. Shiva dropped his earring on the ground, picked it by the toe of his left leg and fixed it back on his ear in the dance. Kali accepted her defeat and said she could not do such a marvellous dance. Shiva said that he alone was equal to her and said further that those coming to worship him here, should worship her first to reap the full benefit of the worship. Since then, Kali has her own temple to grace the devotees.
Kanaka Sabha (Porchabai)	Natarajar Temple	Chidambaram; 11°23′58″N 79°41′36″E	Gold	Ananda Tandava		Chidambaram, the name of the city and the temple literally means "atmosphere of wisdom" or "clothed in thought", the temple architecture symbolizes the connection between the arts and spirituality, creative activity and the divine. The temple wall carvings display all the 108 karanas from the Natya Shastra by Bharata Muni, and these postures form a foundation of Bharatanatyam, a classical Indian dance. Shiva as Nataraja is the primary deity of the temple, it reverentially presents major themes from Shaktism, Vaishnavism, and other traditions of Hinduism. The Chidambaram temple complex, for example, has the earliest known Amman or Devi temple in South India, a pre-13th-century Surya shrine with chariot, shrines for Ganesha, Murugan and Vishnu, one of the earliest known Shiva Ganga sacred pool, large mandapas for the convenience of pilgrims (choultry, ambalam or sabha) and other monuments. Shiva himself is presented as the Nataraja performing the Ananda Tandava ("Dance of Delight") in the golden hall of the shrine Pon Ambalam.
Rajata Sabha (Vellichabai)	Meenakshi Amman Temple	Madurai; 9°55′22″N 78°7′12″E	Silver	Sandhya Tandava		The temple is a historic Hindu temple located on the southern bank of the Vaigai River in the temple city of Madurai, Tamil Nadu, India. It is dedicated to the goddess Meenakshi, a form of Parvati, and her consort, Sundareshvarar, a form of Shiva. The temple is at the center of the ancient temple city of Madurai mentioned in the Tamil Sangam literature, with the goddess temple mentioned in 6th-century-CE texts.
Tamra Sabha (Thamirachabai)	Nellaiappar Temple	Tirunelveli; 8°43′43″N 77°41′17″E	Copper	Muni Tandava		During Puranic times, the place was called Venuvana, a forest of bamboos. The deity in the current temple was believed have appeared inside the bamboo forest. Vishnu is believed to have witnessed the wedding between Shiva and Parvati at this place. There is an image of Vishnu with a metallic gindi, a vessel with a spout, in the temple depicting the legend. Shiva is worshipped as Nellaiappar (also called Venuvananathar) represented by the lingam and his consort Parvati is depicted as Kanthimathi Amman.
Chitra Sabha (Chithirachabai)	Kutralanathar Temple	Courtallam; 8°55′45″N 77°16′9″E	Art	Tripura Tandava		The sage Agastya, at Shiva's request, proceeded southward to stabilize the balance of the earth, and relieve the instability caused by the multitude of entities at Shiva's and Parvati's wedding in the Himalayas, to wait for a glimpse of the divine couple. There he is said to have created the Shivalingam here by shrinking an image of Vishnu, hence the name Kutralam. Architecturally the Chitrasabha resembles that of the other Nataraja Sabhas elsewhere in Tamil Nadu, and its interior is decked with hundreds of murals, depicting images from the Indian epics. Nataraja is brought here during festivals from the Kurumpalaveesar temple. The temple tree is called the Kurum Pala and the temple tank is called Chitranadhi. Nataraja is depicted with the Nritya Tandava posture.
