= Aintharuvi =

Coordinates: 8.9308235°N 77.2356567°E

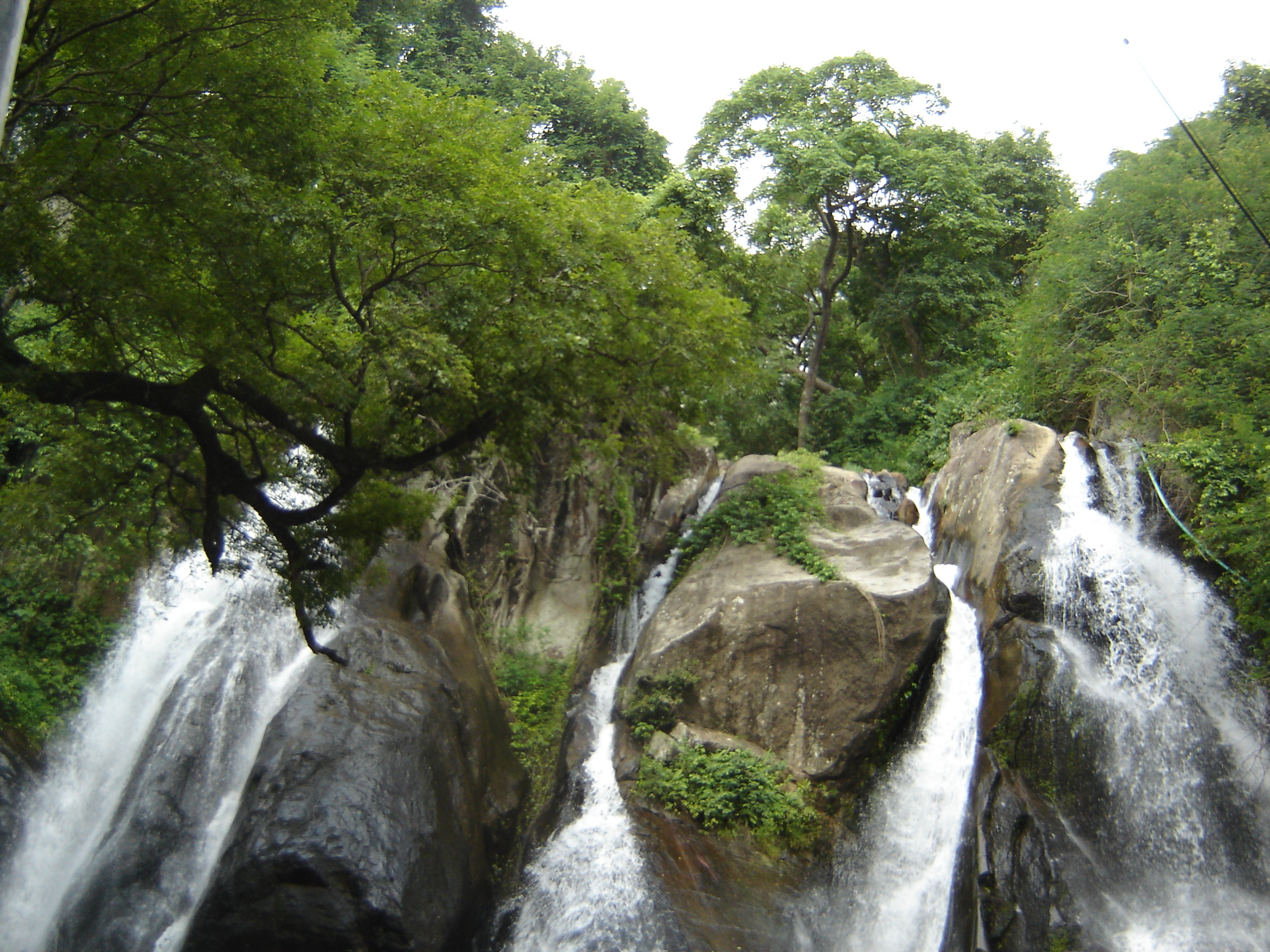
July 24 2014 five falls

Aintharuvi ( five falls ) is a group of five waterfalls, that is near the Coutrallam Falls of Tamil Nadu, in India. It is located in Tenkasi. The English meaning of the name is Five falls. They are compared to Adisesha, the holy snake, since the waterfalls cascade in five directions resembling a five-headed cobra.

Two temples dedicated to Swami Ayyappa and Lord Vinayaka are situated nearby.

== See also ==
- List of waterfalls
- List of waterfalls in India
