= Sri Vadaranyeswarar Temple =

Indian Hindu temple

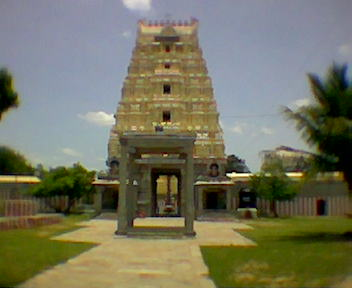

- Location in Tamil Nadu

Religion
- Affiliation: Hinduism
- District: Tiruvallur
- Deity: Sri Vadaranyeswarar
- Festival: Shivraatri

Location
- Location: Thiruvalangadu
- State: Tamil Nadu
- Country: India
- Coordinates: 13°07′49.2″N 79°46′28.7″E

Architecture
- Type: Dravidian architecture

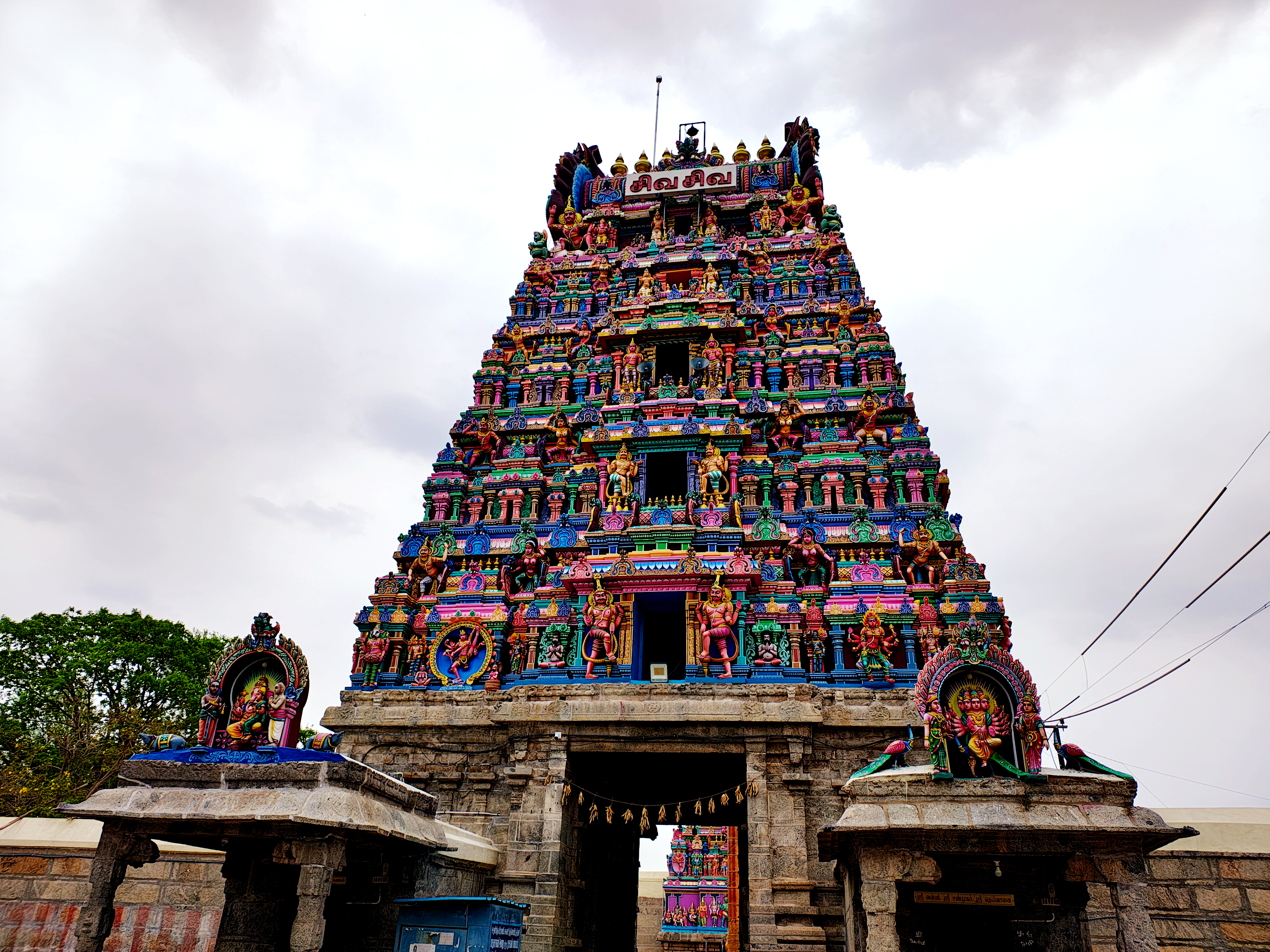
Sri Vadaranyeswarar Temple Rajagopuram

Sri Vadaranyeswarar Temple is a Hindu temple in Thiruvalangadu, in Tiruvallur district of Tamil Nadu.India. It was built by the Cholas during the 12th century CE. It is one of the shrines of the 275 Paadal Petra Sthalams.

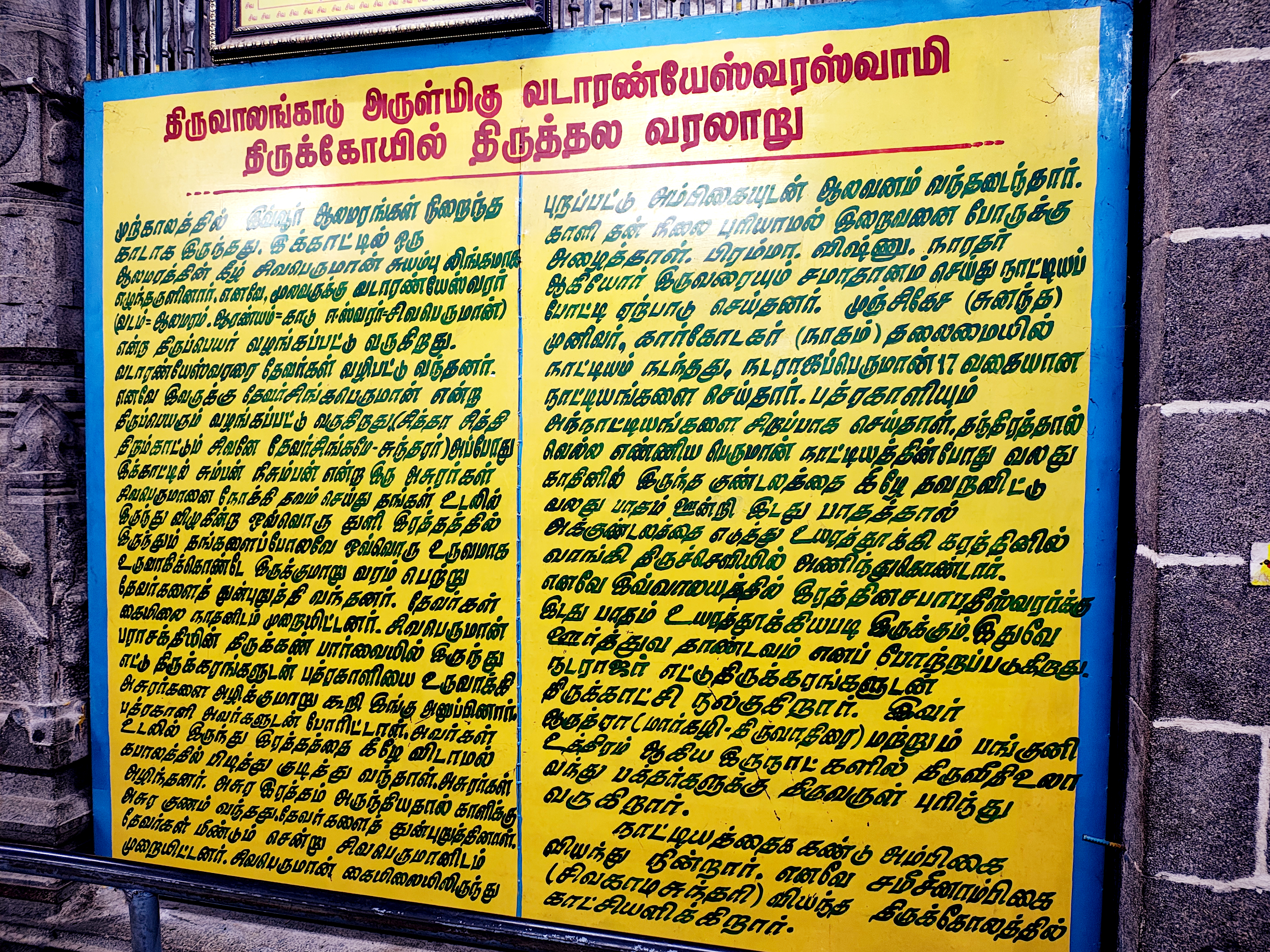
Sri Vadaranyeswarar Temple History

The presiding deity of the temple is Vadaranyeswarar. His consort is known as Vandarkuzhali. This is one of the Pancha Sabhai.

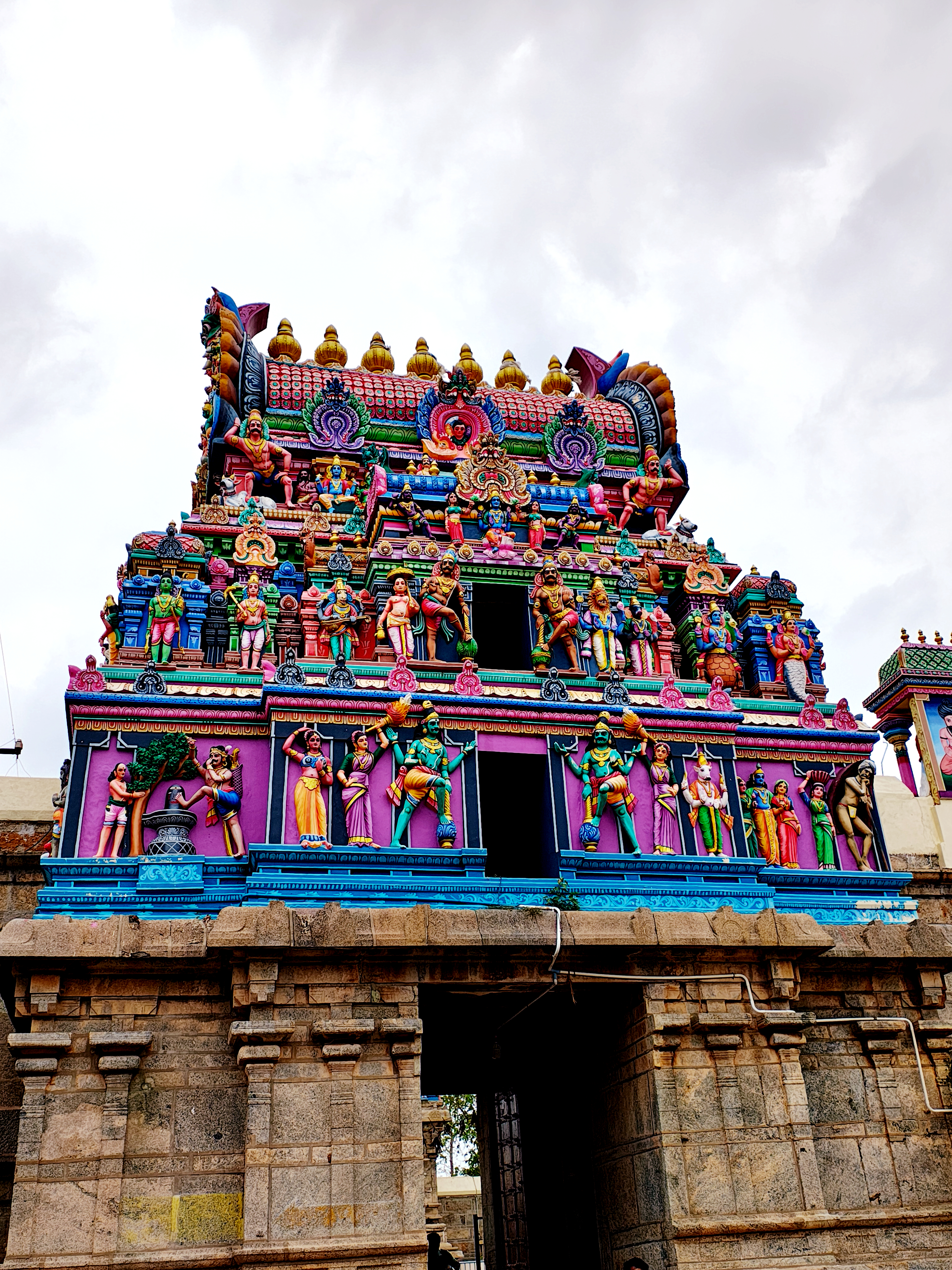
Sri Vadaranyeswarar Temple Inner Gopuram

== Gallery ==
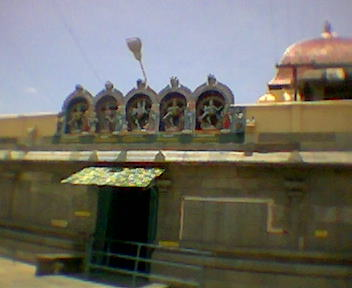
Inner gopura

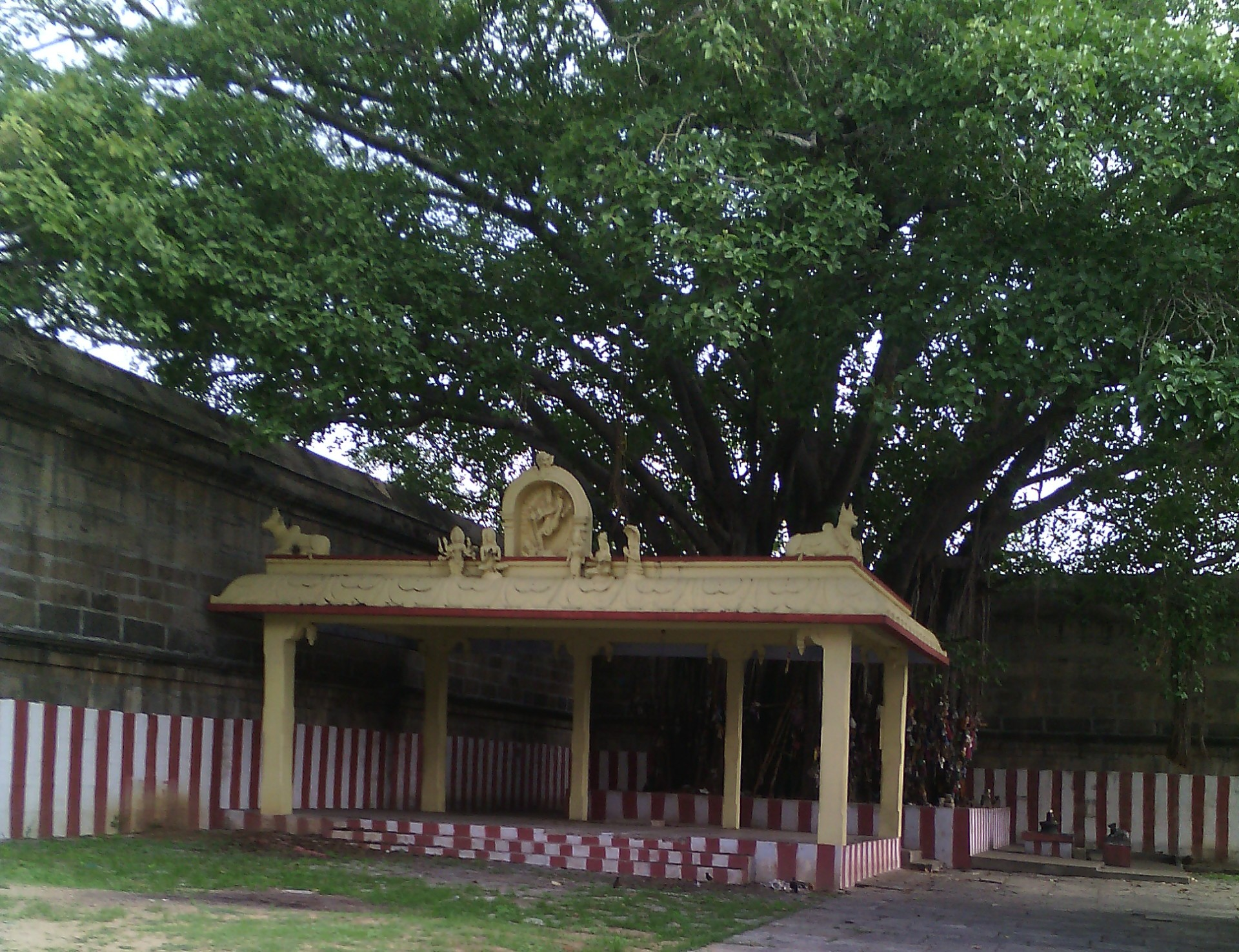
Temple tree

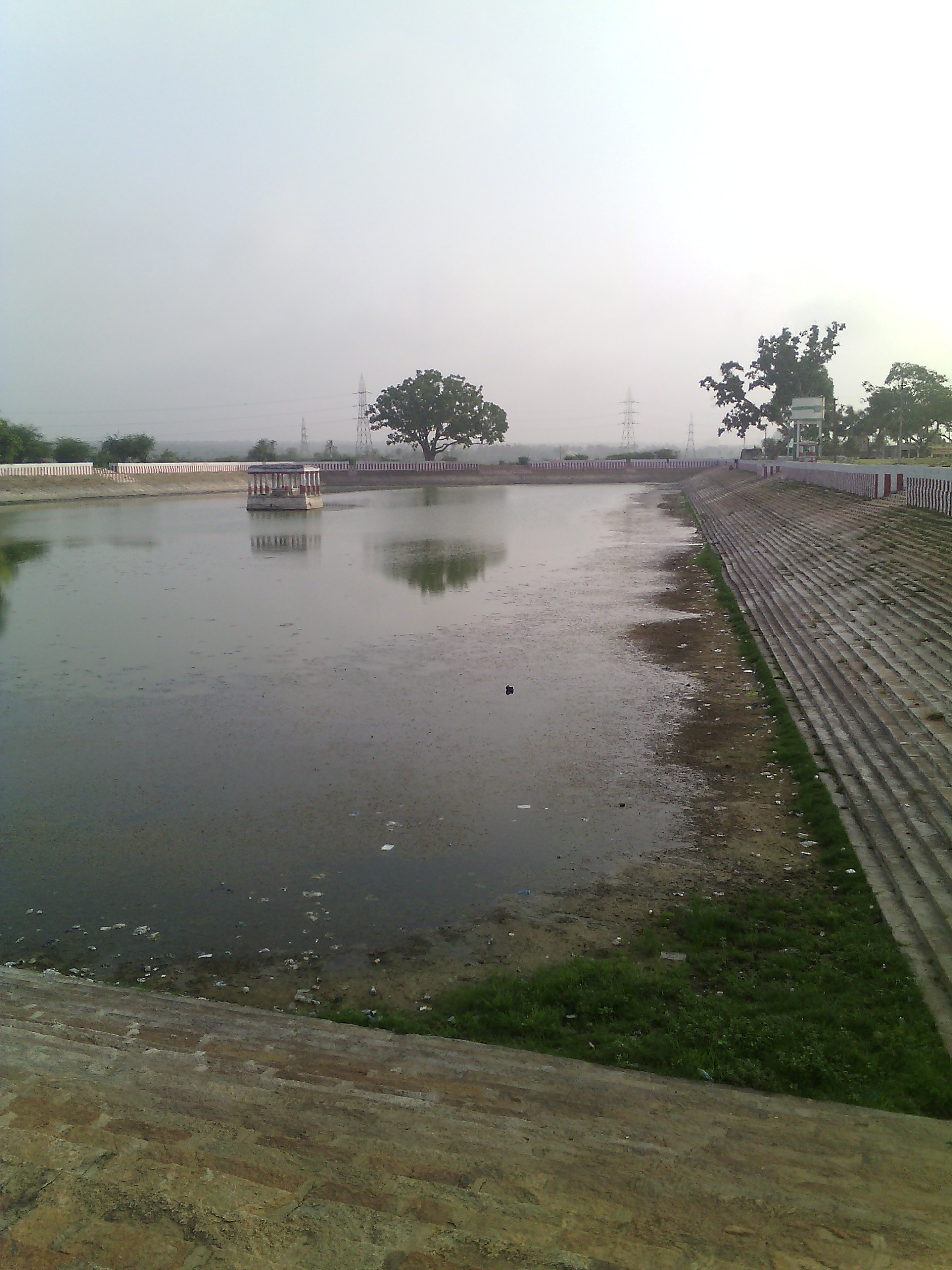
Temple tank

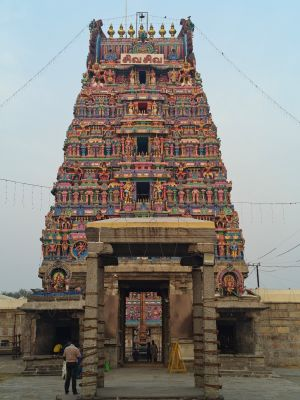
Gopura

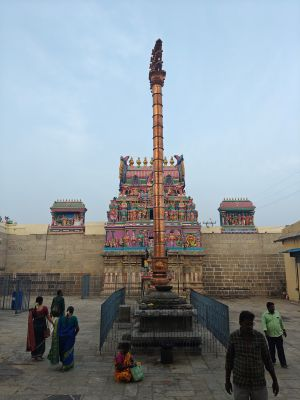
Flagpost

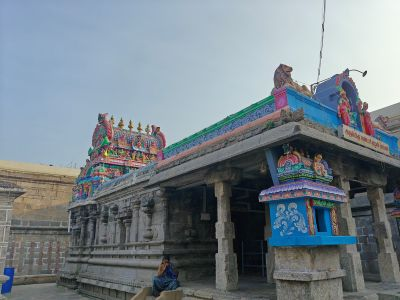
Shrine of Vandarkuzhali
