= Coutrallam Falls =

- Coutrallam Falls
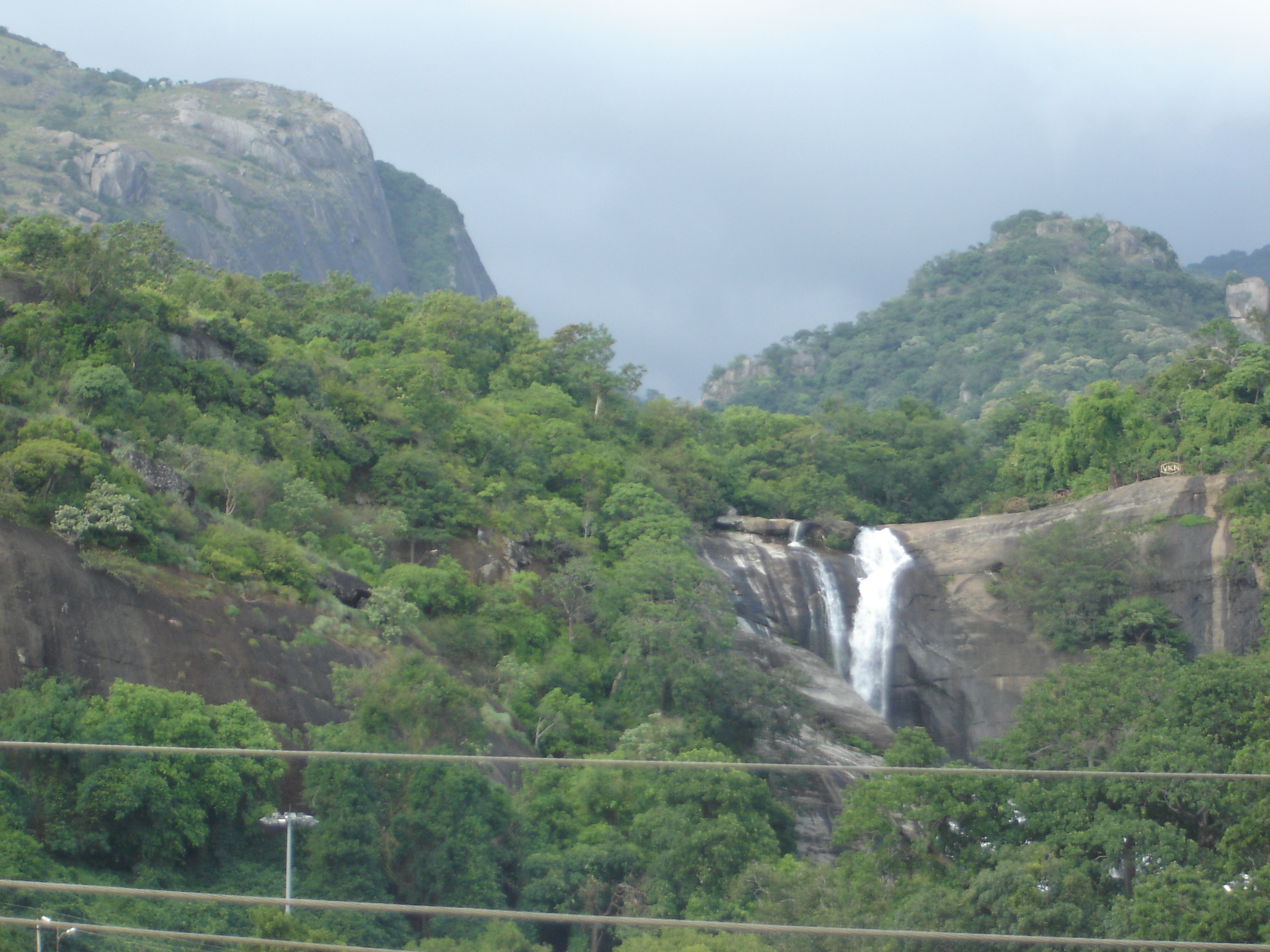
- Main Coutrallam Falls

- Location within Tamil Nadu
- Location: Tenkasi district, Tamil Nadu and Punalur taluk, Kollam district, Kerala
- Coordinates: 8°55′55″N 77°16′09″E
- Type: Segmented Plunges
- Total height: 167 m (548 ft)
- Watercourse: Chittar

Coutrallam Falls (also called Kutralam/Kuttalam Falls) is located in Tenkasi district in the South Indian state of Tamil Nadu bordering Kollam district, Kerala. The falls is located on the Western Ghats on the river Chittar and is considered a "medical spa" on account of the medical smell in the waters. It is located 5 km (3.1 mi) from the nearest city Tenkasi. There are a total of nine falls of which Peraruvi, Aintharuvi, Puli Aruvi and shenbaga devi being the most prominent.

The Tirunelveli district administration organises Saral Vila, an eight-day festival every year during the Tamil month of Adi (July - August). The falls is the most prominent tourist destination in the region and usually frequented by devotees of the Papanasanathar Temple and Sabarimala. The season starts with the South West monsoon from July to September. The Tamil Nadu Tourism Development Corporation (TTDC) has a boat house that operates boating during season.

== Legend ==
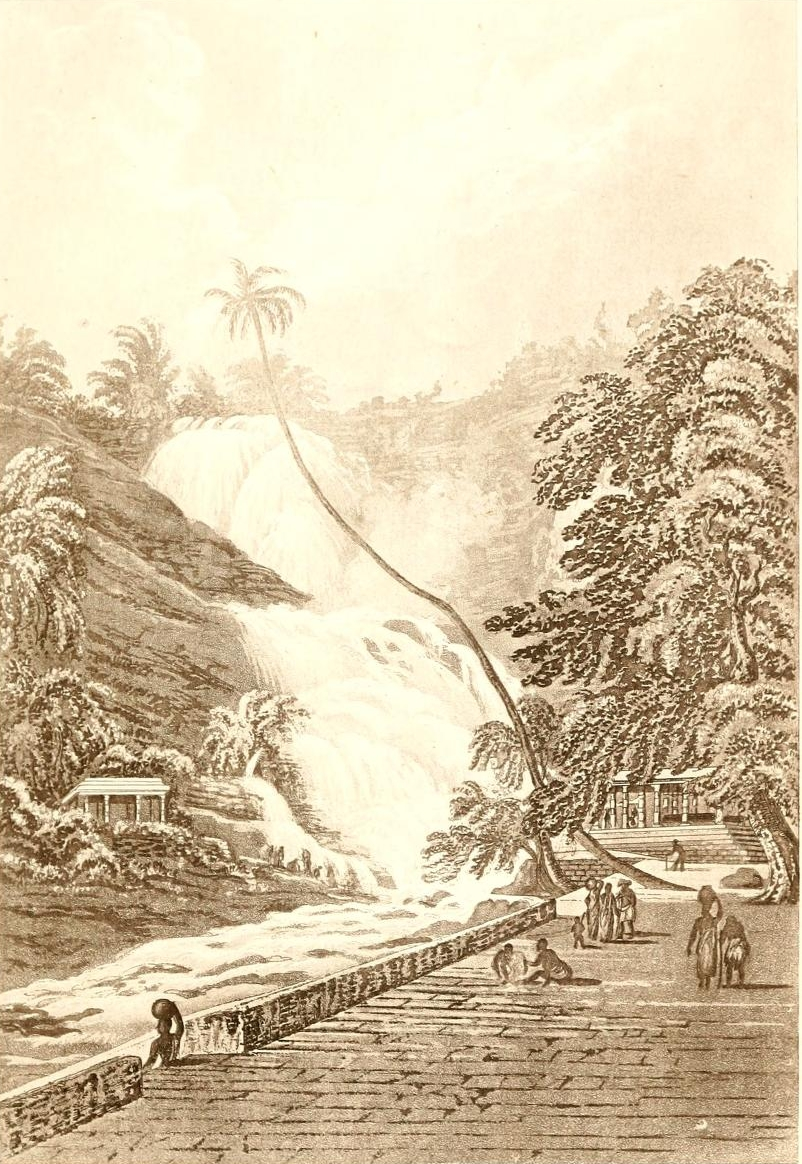
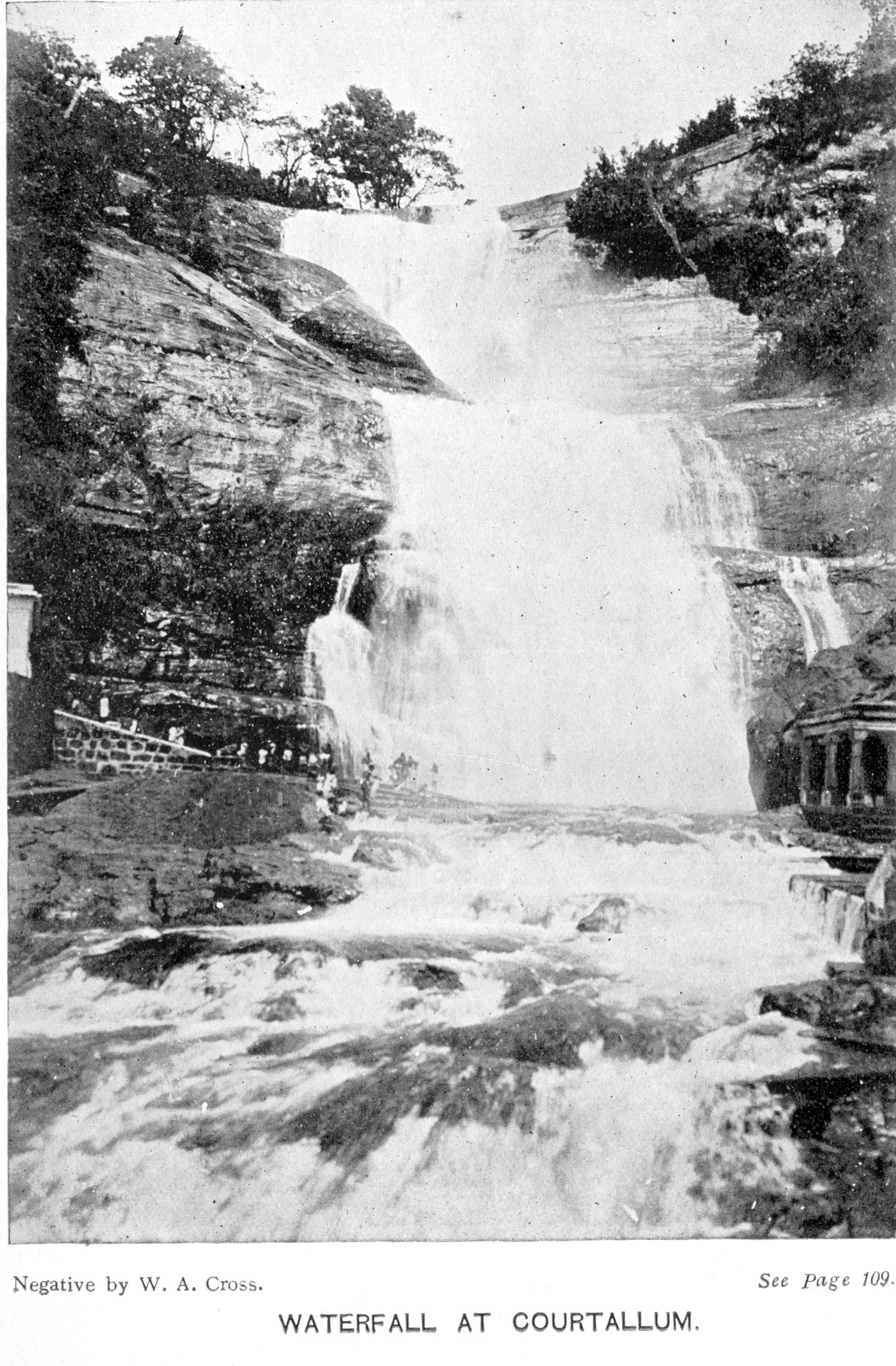

As per Hindu legend, during the divine wedding of Shiva and Parvathi, there was heavy crowd at Kailash, the abode of Shiva. Sage Agasthya could not view event and prayed to Shiva at this place to get him a view of the event. Shiva told him that he would offer darshan in Kutralam itself. Dvarapalas, the gateway deities did not allow entry to Agasthya, which was originally a Vishnu temple. With his powers, he changed Vishnu to Shiva, conch to deer and Tulsi to crescent moon and pressed the head of Vishnu until it became a lingam, the iconic form of Shiva. On account of the heavy pressing, Shiva got a headache and it is believed that in modern times, the image of the presiding deity carries the hand marks of the sage. To alleviate the headache of Shiva, the sage prepared an oil with cow milk, green coconut and mixture of 42 herbs and applied it to Shiva. Pleased by his devotion, Shiva made the place his abode and came to be called Kutralanathar and the falls nearby the temple got the name of Coutrallam as Coutrallam Falls. The tradition is followed in the Kutralanathar Temple in modern times as well.

== Geography ==
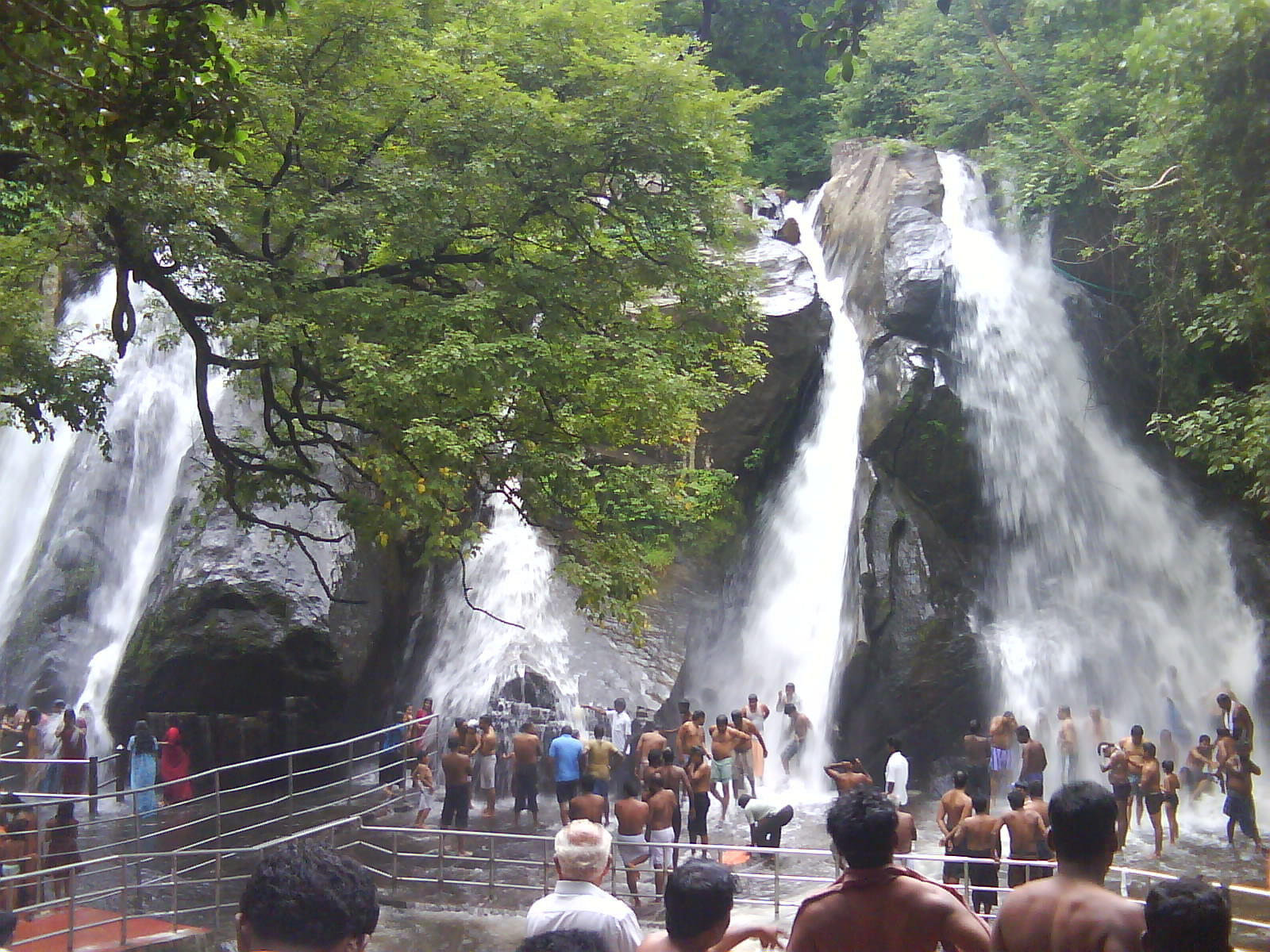
Image of Aintharuvi, Five Falls

Coutrallam Falls is located in Western Ghats to the South of Coutrallam town and to the north of Coutrallam Lower, the first lake in the descent of Chittar. It is located 5 km (3.1 mi) from the nearest town Tenkasi and 59 km (37 mi) from the nearest city Tirunelveli. The place is frequented by animals like Tiger and Panther, which are frequently spotted in the route from Coutrallam Falls to Papansam as both are located close to Kalakkad Mundanthurai Tiger Reserve. There are a total of nine falls namely, Peraruvi (Main Falls), Aintharuvi (Five Falls), Shenbaga Devi Aruvi, Thenaruvi (Honey Falls), Chitraruvi, Puli Aruvi (Tiger Falls), Pazhaya Aruvi (Old Falls), Puthu Aruvi (New Falls) and Pazhathotta Aruvi (Fruit Garden Falls), each of which is located within 1 km (0.62 mi) radius. The falls receives its waters during the South-west monsoon from May to September, but the maximum amount of rainfall is received during the North-east monsoon during October to December. The Kutralanathar Temple is located close to the main falls.

== Culture ==
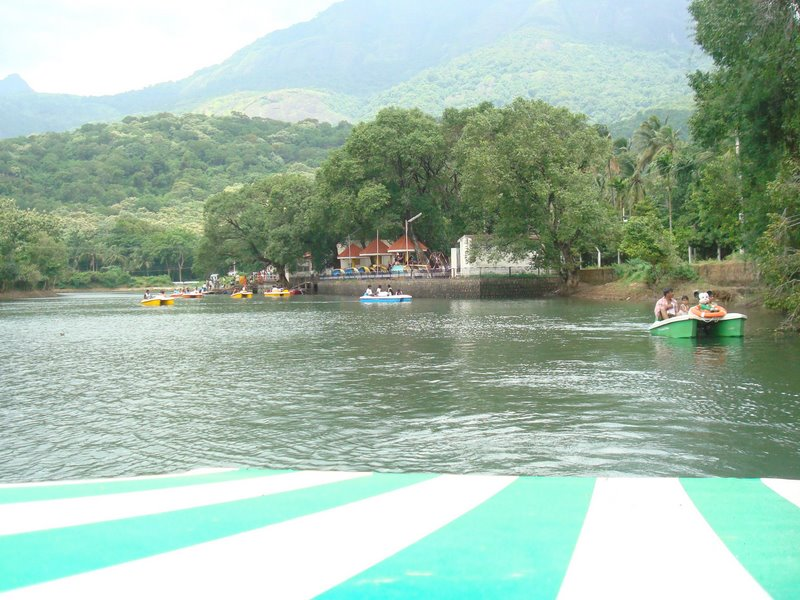
The Boat House in the Falls

The Tirunelveli district administration organises Saral Vizha every year during the Tamil month of Aadi (July - August). The falls is usually frequented by devotees of the Papanasanathar Temple, who take a holy dip in the falls before visiting the temple. The falls is also frequented by tourists to Sabarimala during the November - December season in a religious circuit in the region and Agasthiyar Falls. Various competitions like Swimming, pedal boating, row boating and debating are organised during the festival. There are also flower exhibits from Ooty and Kodaikanal, light music shows, dog show and dance performance. The Tamil Nadu Tourism Development Corporation (TTDC) has a boat house that boatincontrols during season.

== See also ==
- List of waterfalls
- List of waterfalls in India
