= Courtallam =

Raja Courtallam Coutrallam
- Town
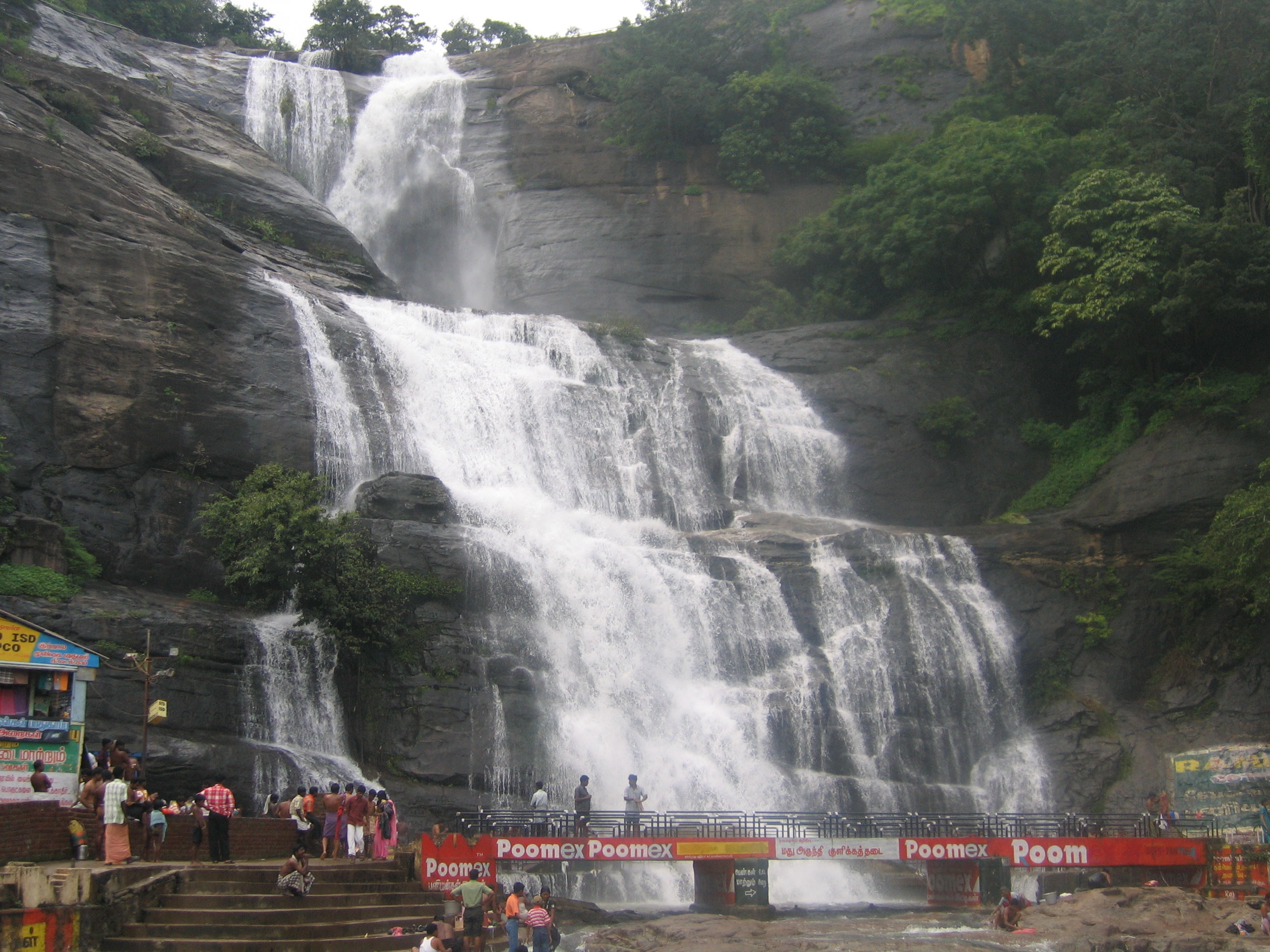
- Main waterfalls

- Location in Tamil Nadu, India
- Coordinates: 8.9342°N 77.2778°E
- Country: India
- State: Tamil Nadu
- District: Tenkasi
- Taluk: Tenkasi

Government
  - Type: Town Panchayat
- Elevation: 167.64 m (550.0 ft)

Population (2001)
  - Total: 2,368

Languages
  - Official: Tamil
- Time zone: UTC+5:30 (IST)
- Telephone code: 04633
- Vehicle registration: TN 76
- Website: https://tenkasi.nic.in/tourist-place/coutrallam/

Rajah Courtallam, natively spelt Kutrālam or Kuttālam, is a panchayat town situated at a mean elevation of 160 m (520 ft) in the foothills of the Western Ghats in Tenkasi district of Tamil Nadu, India. The Coutrallam Falls on the Chittar River is a major tourist attraction.

== Climate ==
Climate data for Courtallam, Tamil Nadu
Month	Jan	Feb	Mar	Apr	May	Jun	Jul	Aug	Sep	Oct	Nov	Dec	Year
Mean daily maximum °C (°F)	29.0 (84.2)	30.5 (86.9)	32.1 (89.8)	32.4 (90.3)	32.5 (90.5)	30.7 (87.3)	29.9 (85.8)	30.0 (86.0)	30.6 (87.1)	29.9 (85.8)	28.6 (83.5)	28.5 (83.3)	30.4 (86.7)
Mean daily minimum °C (°F)	20.9 (69.6)	21.5 (70.7)	23.0 (73.4)	24.1 (75.4)	24.7 (76.5)	23.8 (74.8)	23.4 (74.1)	23.4 (74.1)	23.2 (73.8)	22.9 (73.2)	22.1 (71.8)	21.2 (70.2)	22.8 (73.1)
Average precipitation mm (inches)	41 (1.6)	36 (1.4)	66 (2.6)	107 (4.2)	95 (3.7)	152 (6.0)	138 (5.4)	71 (2.8)	76 (3.0)	224 (8.8)	216 (8.5)	97 (3.8)	1,319 (51.8)
Source: Climate-Data.org

== Demographics ==
As of 2001 India census, Courtallam had a population of 2,368. Males constitute 41% of the population and females 59%. Courtallam has an average literacy rate of 75%, higher than the national average of 59.5%: male literacy is 78% and, female literacy is 74%. 7% of the population is under 6 years of age.

== Location ==
Located in the Western Ghats, Courtallam is part of the Agasthiamalai range, the mountain bearing the name of sage Agastya who is believed to have lived in the area. The closest town to Courtallam is Tenkasi at 5 km (3.1 mi). The closest airports are Tuticorin Airport (91 km away )and Trivandrum International Airport (122 km away) Madurai International Airport (162 km). The nearest railway station is at Tenkasi, 5 km (3.1 mi) away.

== Places of interest ==
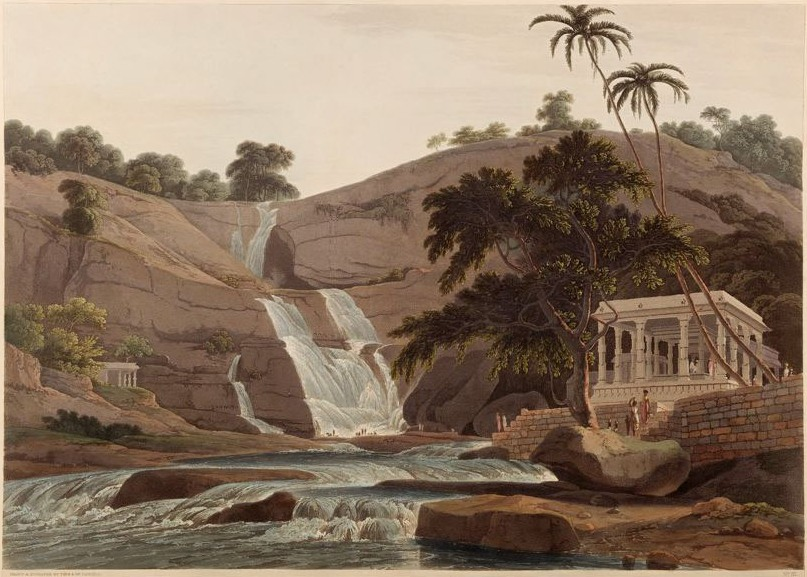
The waterfall at Courtallum, and the Kuttalanatha shrine, bef. 1804 by Thomas Daniell

Courtallam Falls is located near the town.

The Kutralanatha swamy temple is the location of Chitra Sabha, one of the five sabhas of Nataraja, a form of Lord Shiva. Pancha Sabhai Sthalangal refers to the temples of Nataraja, a form of the Hindu god Shiva where he performed the Cosmic Dance Tandava. The temple at the foot of the hill is conch-shaped which has special significance in Hindu tradition. Tamil poet Thirukudarasappa Kavirayar sang about the beauty of this place in his "Kutraala Kuravanji". Kurumpalaveesar, sung in Tevaram was done by Sambandar. It is one of the shrines of the 275 Paadal Petra Sthalams. kuttalam palace is managed by the Kerala archeological department

== In popular culture ==
Courtallam has featured in films including:

- Papanasam (2015)
- Poova Thalaya (1969)
- Aravaan (2012)
- Vettai (2012)
- Mirchi (film) (2013)
- Seethamma Vakitlo Sirimalle Chettu (2013)
- Suvadugal (2013)
- Anjala (film) (2014)
- Etharkkum Thunindhavan (2022)

== See also ==
- List of waterfalls
- List of waterfalls in India
