= Kuttalam Palace =

Travancore palace in Tamil Nadu

Kuttalam Palace (or Courtallam Palace) is a palace situated in the Courtallam village of Tenkasi district (Old Thirunelveli District), Tamil Nadu, India. It is one of the important palaces of the Travancore province. It is owned and maintained by the Kerala Archaeological Department. It is located in the foothills of Western Ghats and in the middle of Courtallam. It was built by Vishakam Thirunal in 1882. The palace and guesthouse consist of 56.6 acres. Courtallam falls are the important nearby destination for tourists.

Before 1956, these areas were under the control of Travancore-Cochin state. These Courtallam and Shenkottai were a part of Shenkottai taluk of Kollam district, Travancore state including Aryankavu village. In 1956, Aryankavu panchayath was transferred to the Kerala state and the rest of Shenkottai taluk was transferred to Madras state.

In June 2014, Kerala Revenue Minister Adoor Prakash said that the government has taken a decision to take steps to protect the palace and 35 acres of land at Courtallam.
