= Palai park =

Genetic Heritage Garden in Tamil Nadu

- Palai Genetic Heritage Garden
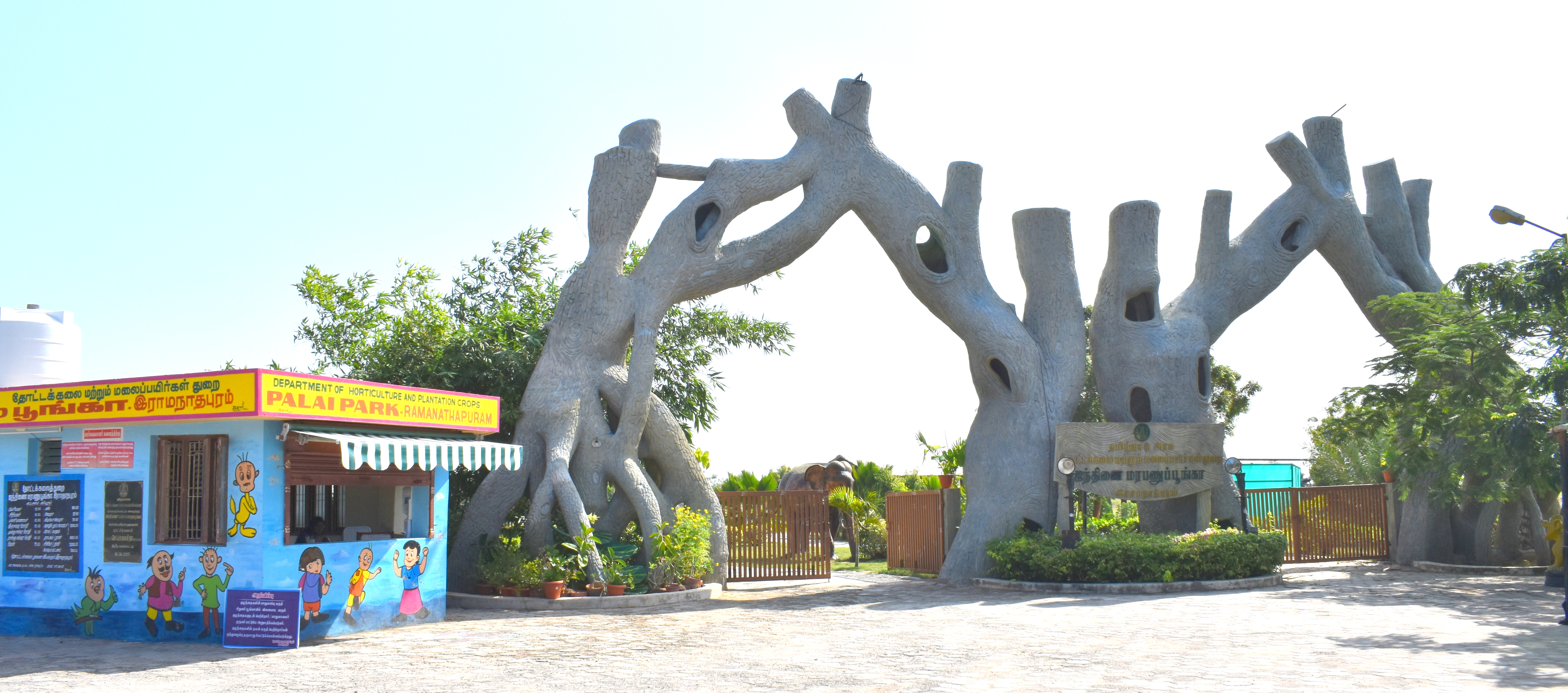
- Entrance of Palai park, Ramnad
- Interactive map of Palai park
- Type: Ecological park
- Location: Ramanadhapuram, India
- Nearest town: Kilakarai
- Coordinates: 9°18′49″N 78°49′51″E
- Area: 10 hectares (25 acres)
- Opened: June 2015
- Owner: Government of Tamil Nadu

Palai Park (Tamil: பாலை பூங்கா) is one among the two Genetic Heritage Gardens in Tamil Nadu (Palai Park at Achadiparambu, Ramanadhapuram and Kurinji Park at Yercaud, Salem). This park is maintained by the Department of Horticulture and Plantation Crops. It was named after the Palai landscape, one of the five landscapes mentioned in the ancient sangam literature representing dry ecological zone. This garden was developed by Tamil Nadu Horticulture Development Agency (TANHODA) and opened by then chief minister Selvi J. Jayalalithaa.

== Interesting features ==
Some of the interesting features in the Palai Genetic Heritage Garden include: lawns, sand dunes, a small pond, an Oasis, a nursery area, a park area for children, a podium area, gazebos and a food court.

== Gallery ==
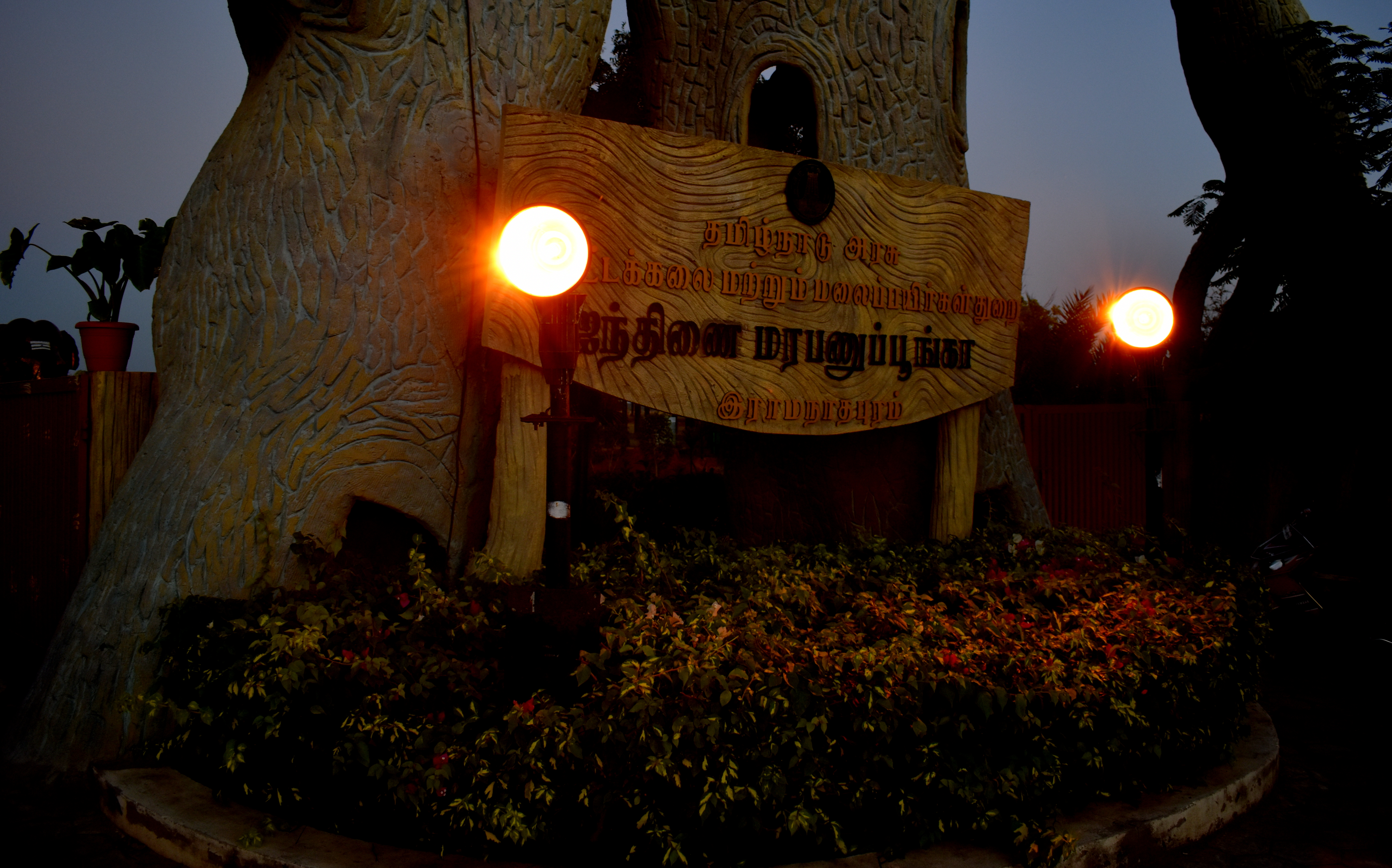
Entrance board in palai park

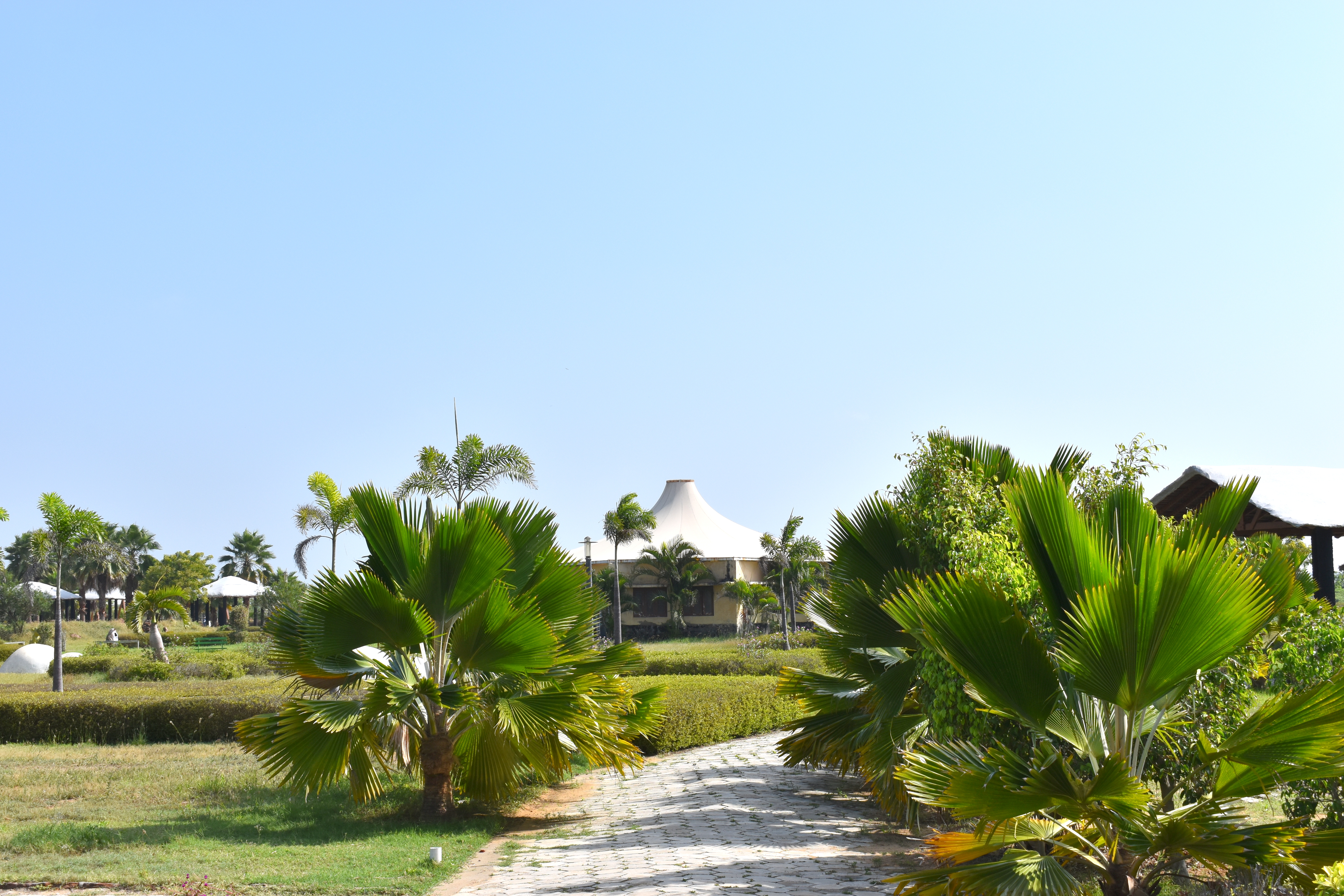
The walkway in palai genetic heritage garden

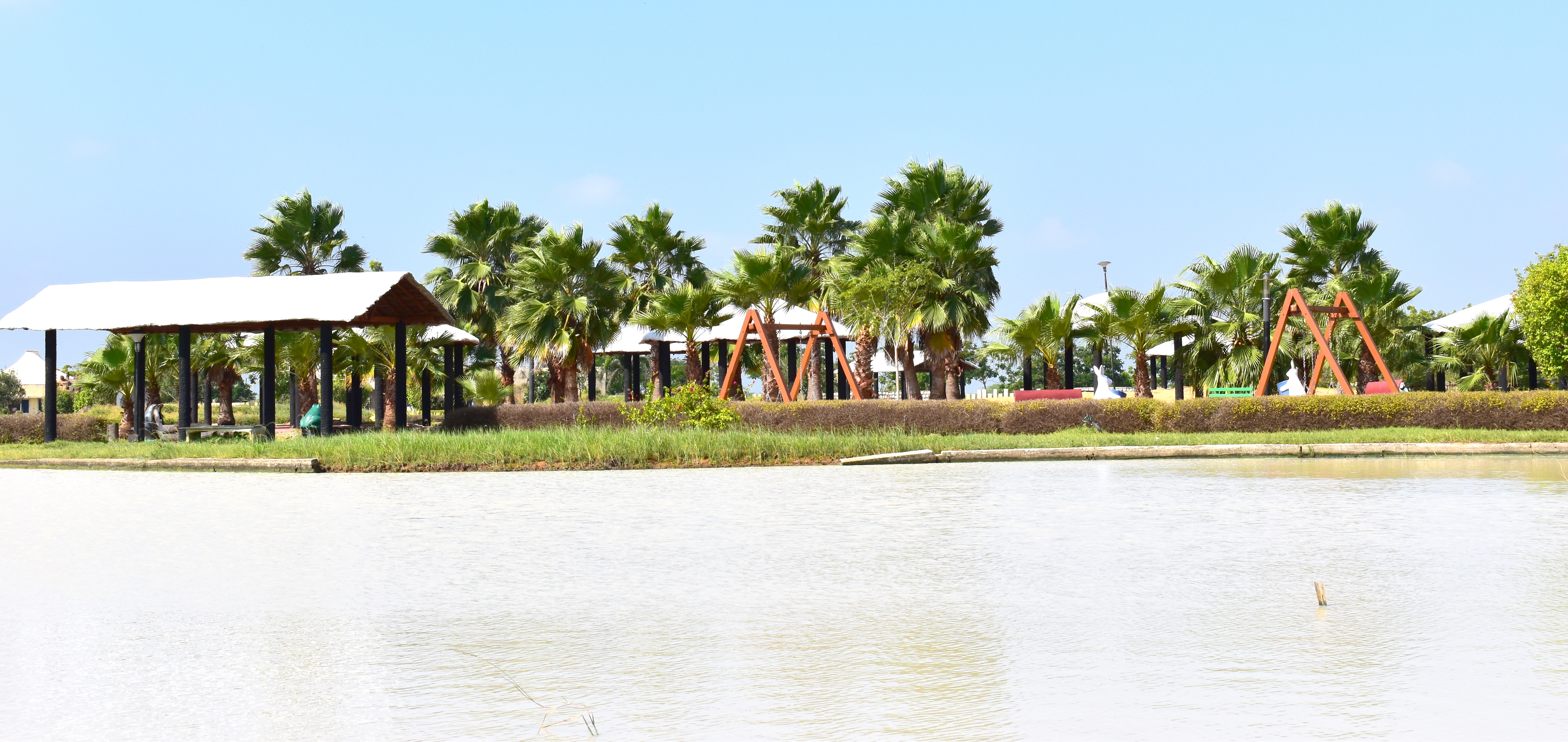
The view of Oasis in palai park from the other end of pond

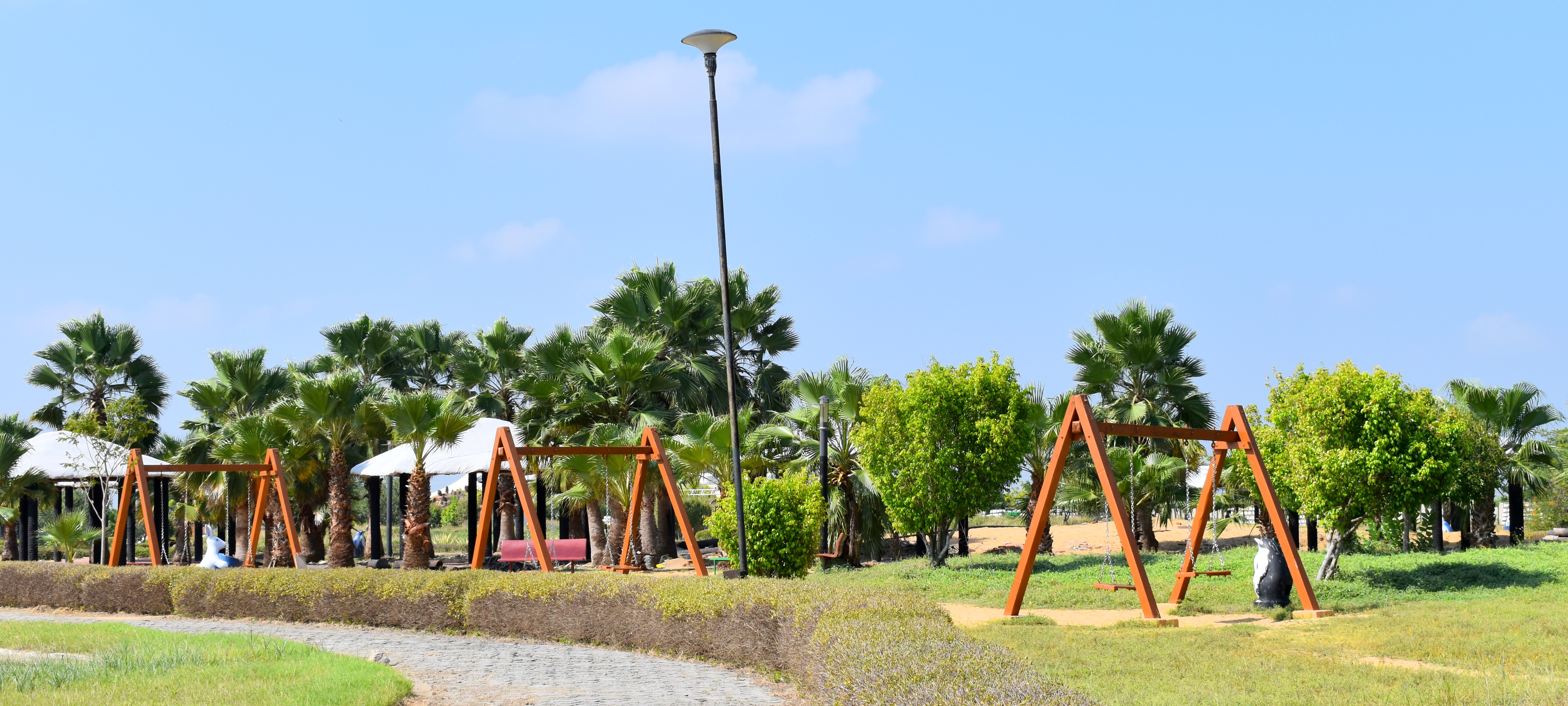
Various children play items in palai park

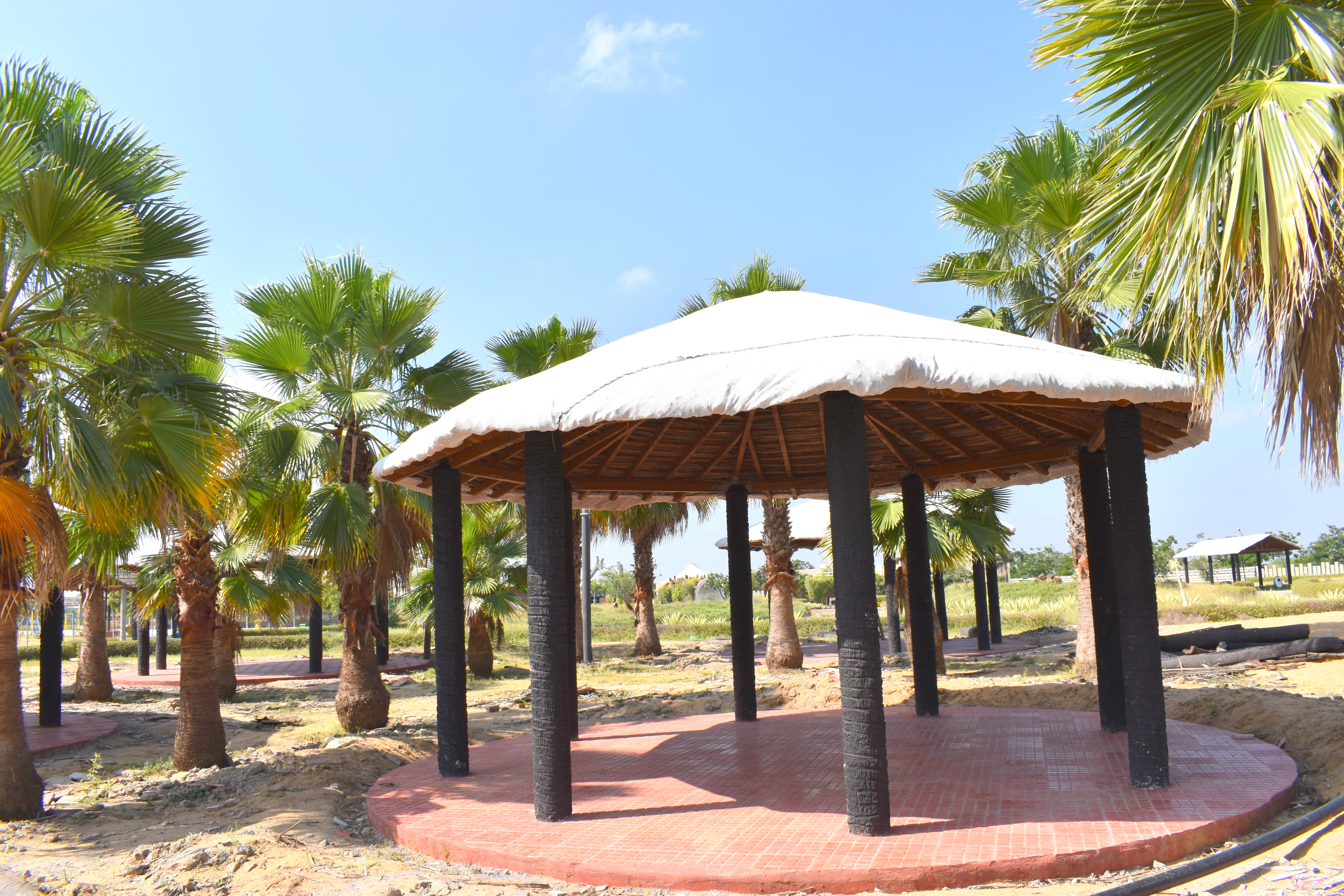
Gazebo in palai park

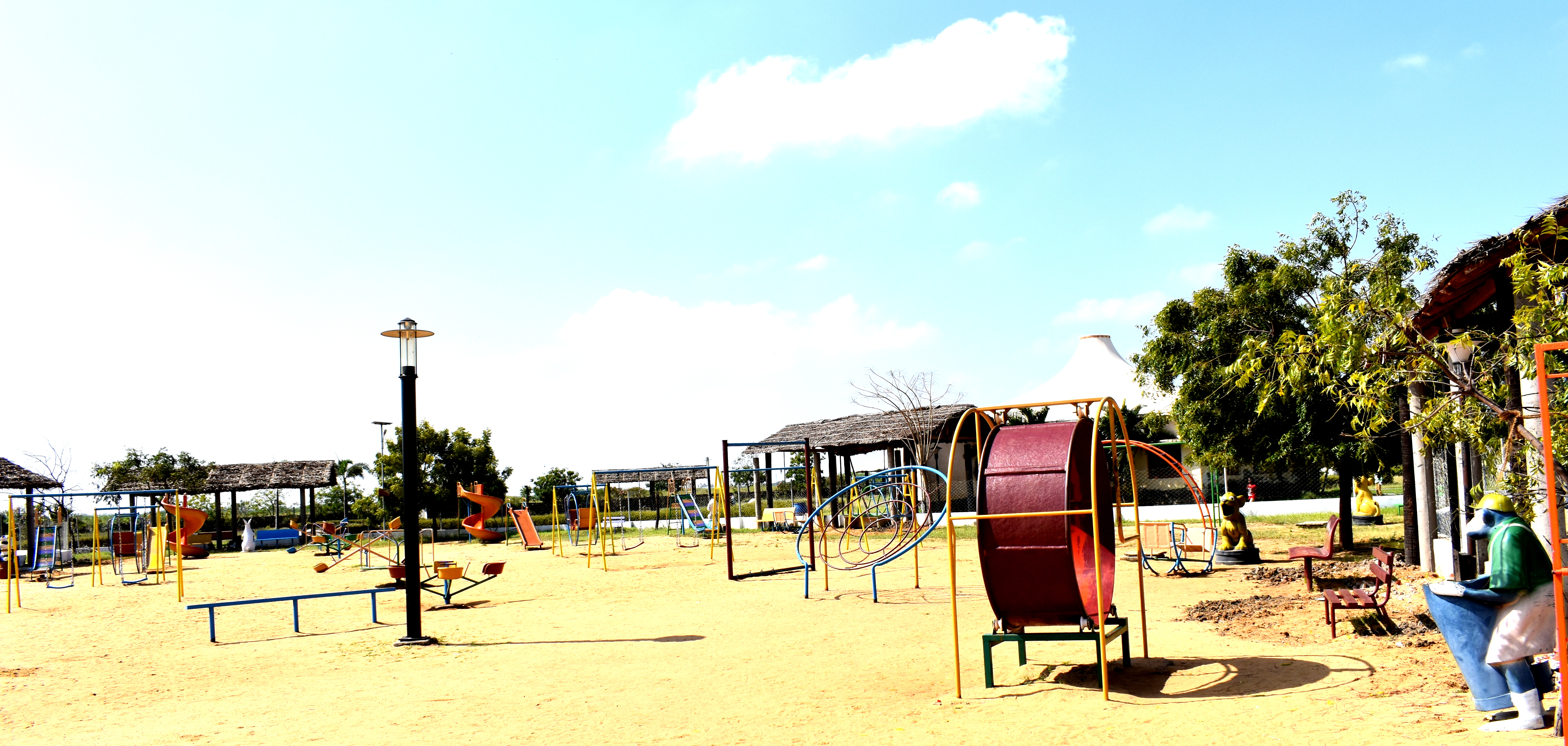
Children play area in palai park

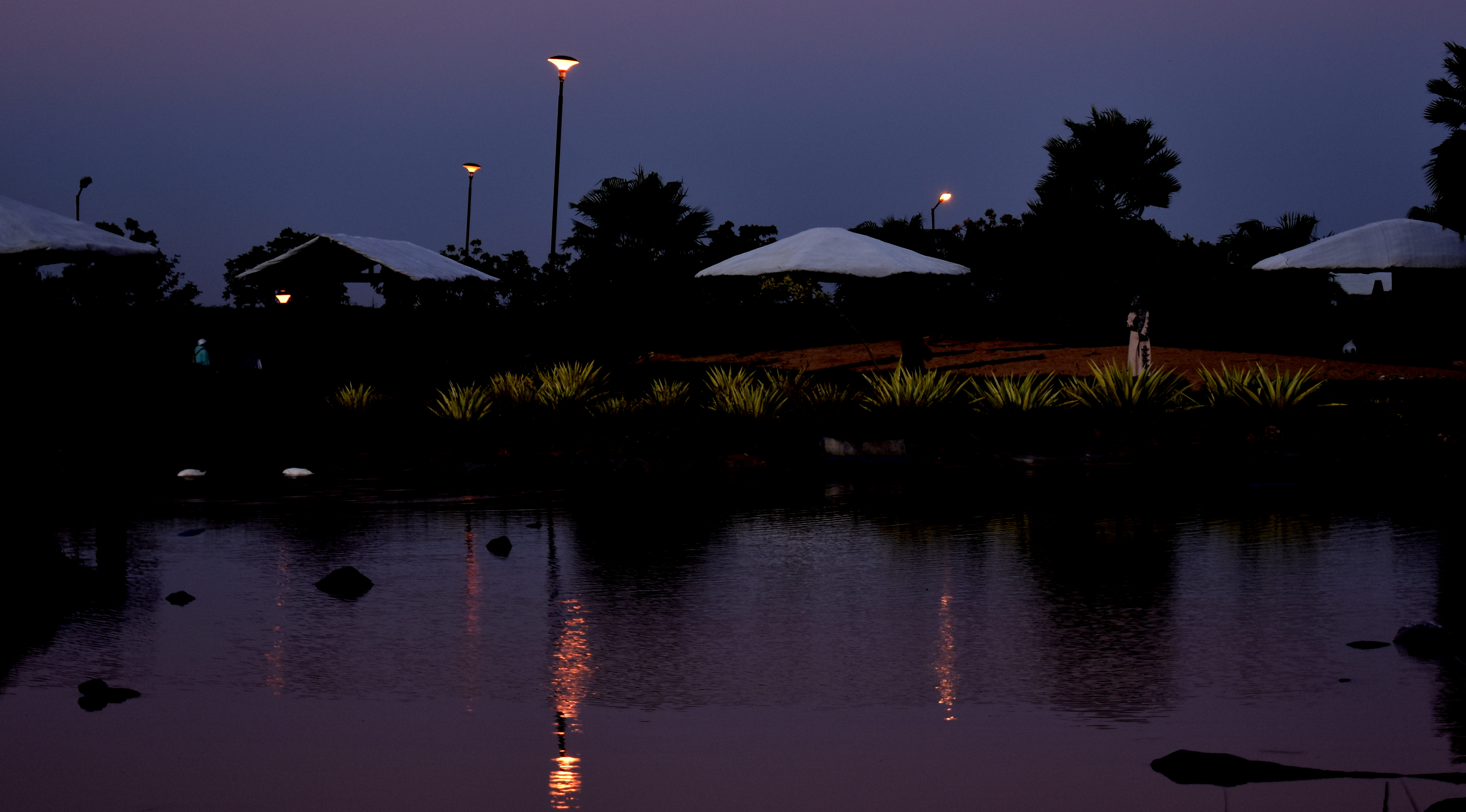
Oasis in palai park evening view

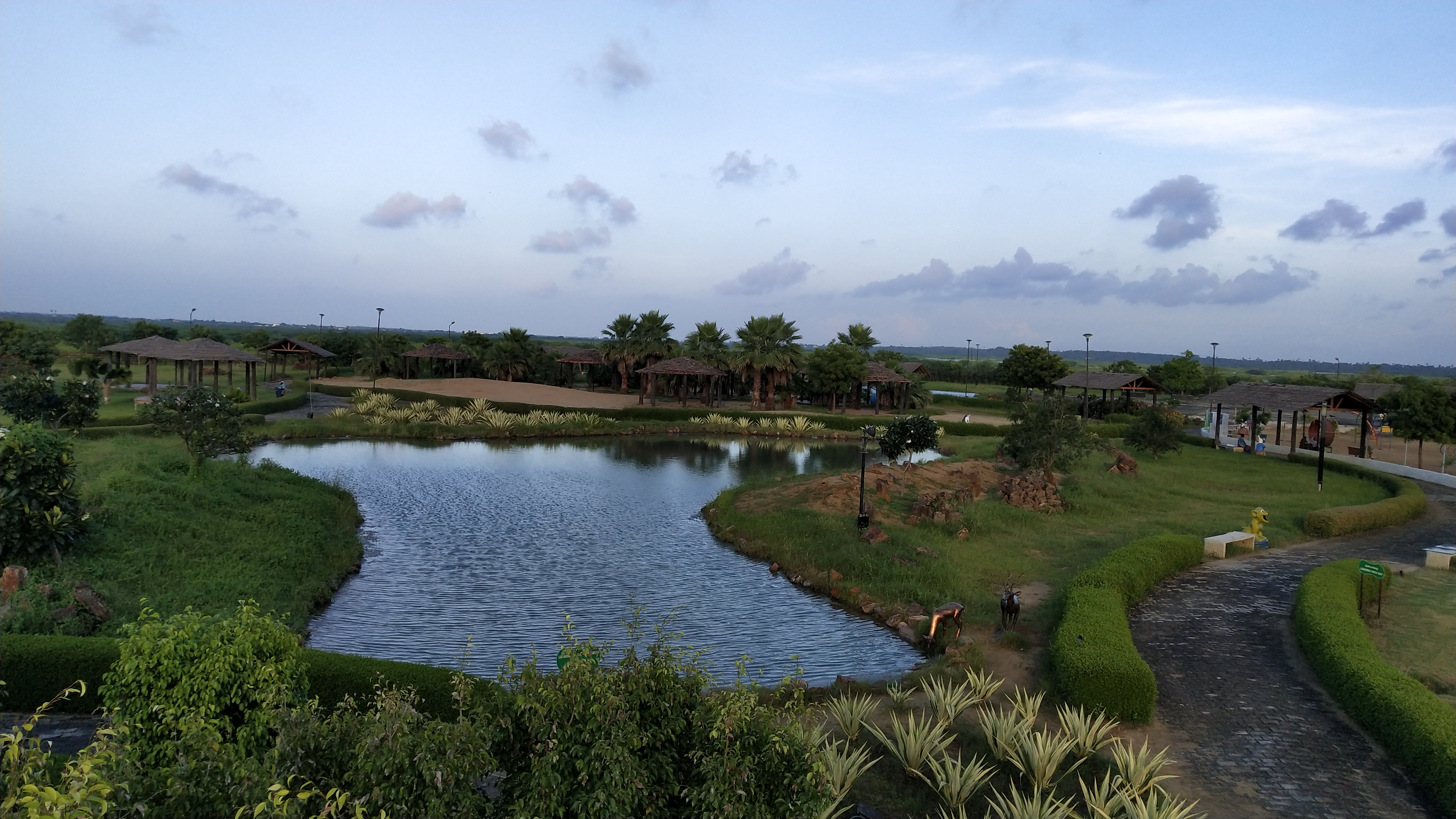
Aerial view of pond at palai genetic heritage garden

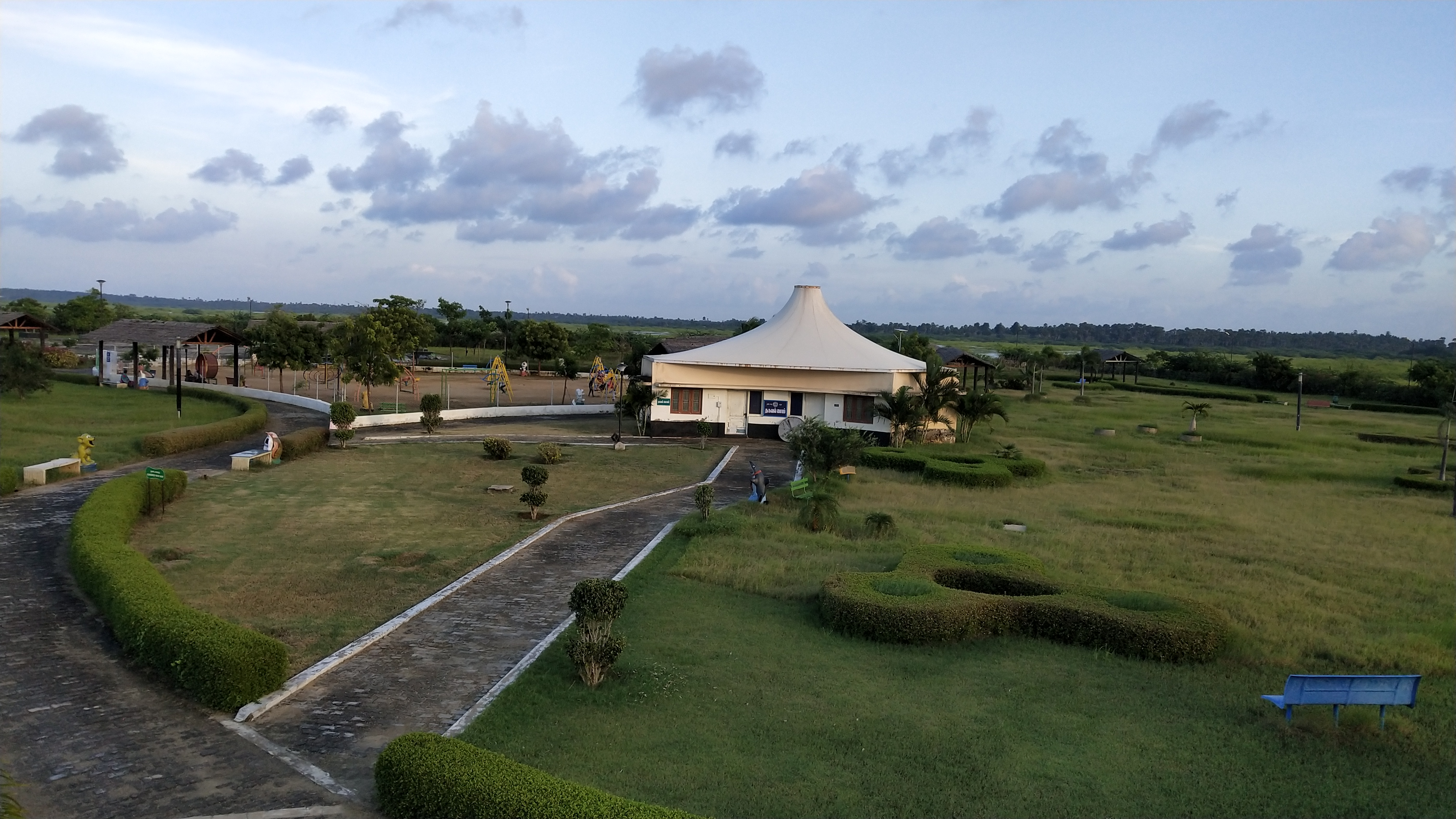
View of office building at palai genetic heritage garden

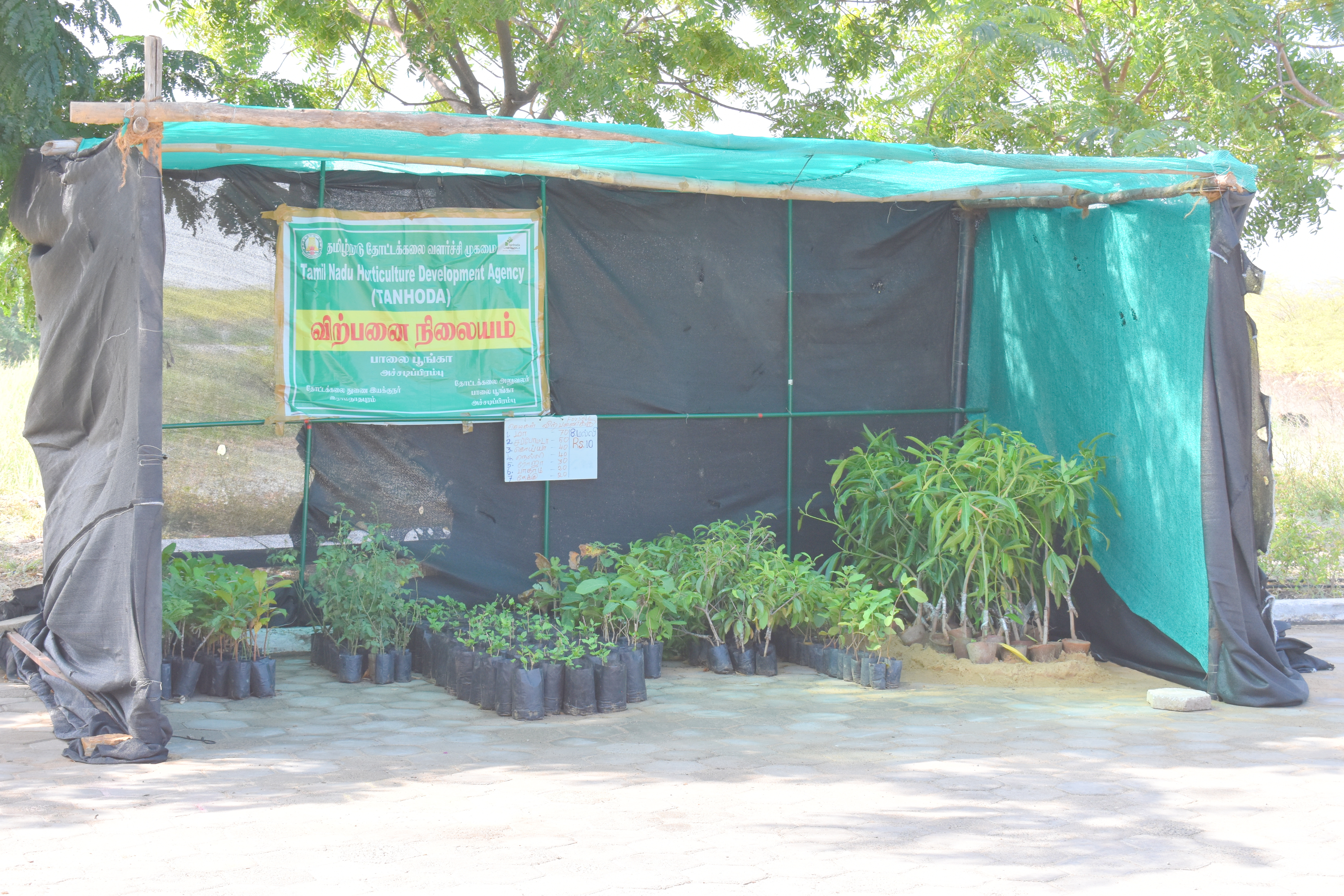
Outlet for sales of nursery plants and other products produced from various activities in the department

== See also ==
- List of botanical gardens in Tamil Nadu
