= Thirukutralam =

Shiva temple in Tenkasi district, Tamil Nadu, India

- Kutralanathar Temple
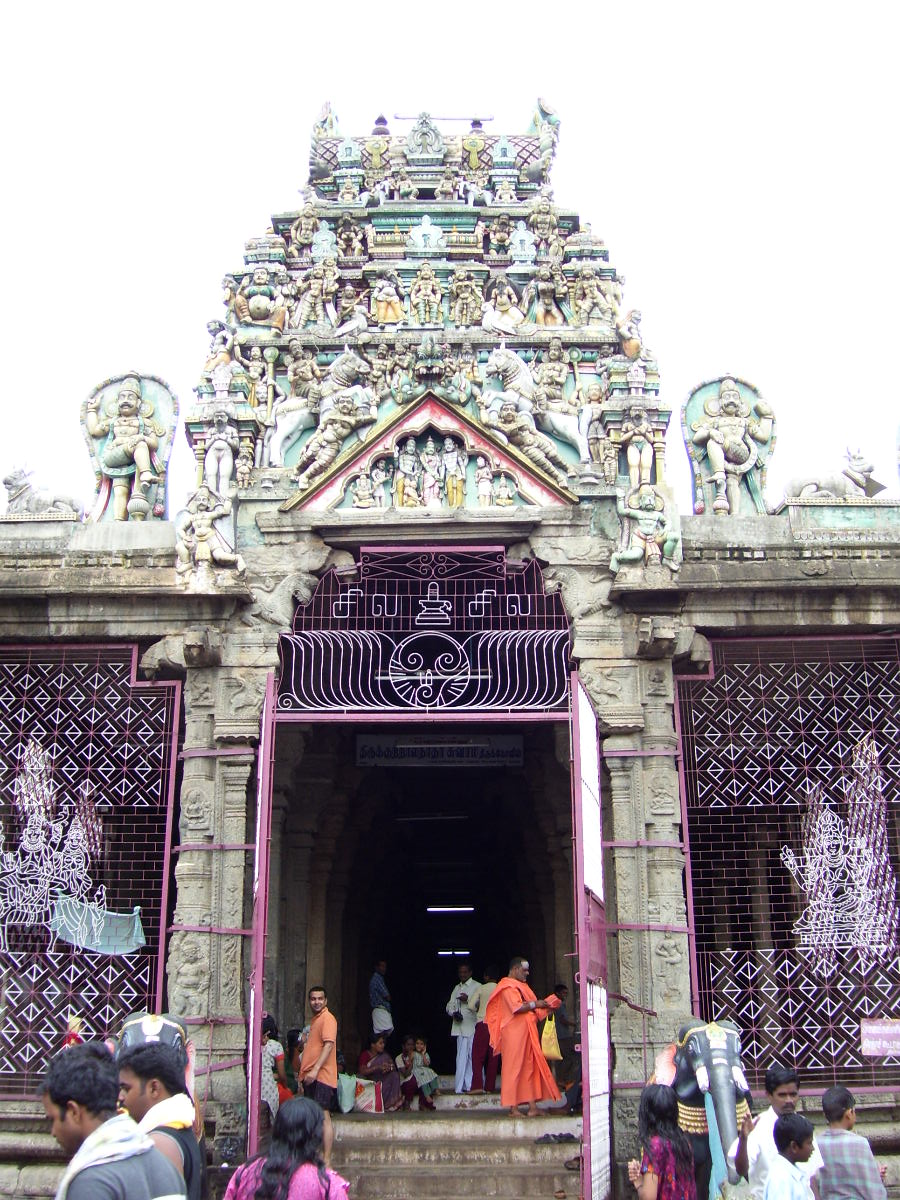

- Location in Tamil Nadu

Religion
- Affiliation: Hinduism
- District: Tenkasi
- Deity: Kutralanathar (Shiva) , Kuzhalvaaimozhiammai (Parvati)

Location
- State: Tamil Nadu
- Country: India
- Coordinates: 8°55′45″N 77°16′9″E

Architecture
- Type: Dravidian architecture
- Creator: Pandyas, Cholas, Travancore

Thirukutralam represents one of the five Pancha Sabhas of Nataraja - Chitra Sabhai. The five dance halls of Shiva are Chidambaram, Madurai, Thiruvalangadu, Tirunelveli and Kutralam. Kutralam is also known as Trikootaachalam. This temple is one among the 276 Paadal Petra Sthalams. Shiva is worshipped here as Kutralanathaswamy and Parvati as Kuzhalvaaimozhi Ambal.

== Location ==
Courtallam is a popular tourist resort in Southern Tamil Nadu known for its waterfalls, amidst picturesque surroundings - and is a source of inspiration of many a literary work. Thousands visit this town when the waterfalls are in season.

== Legend ==
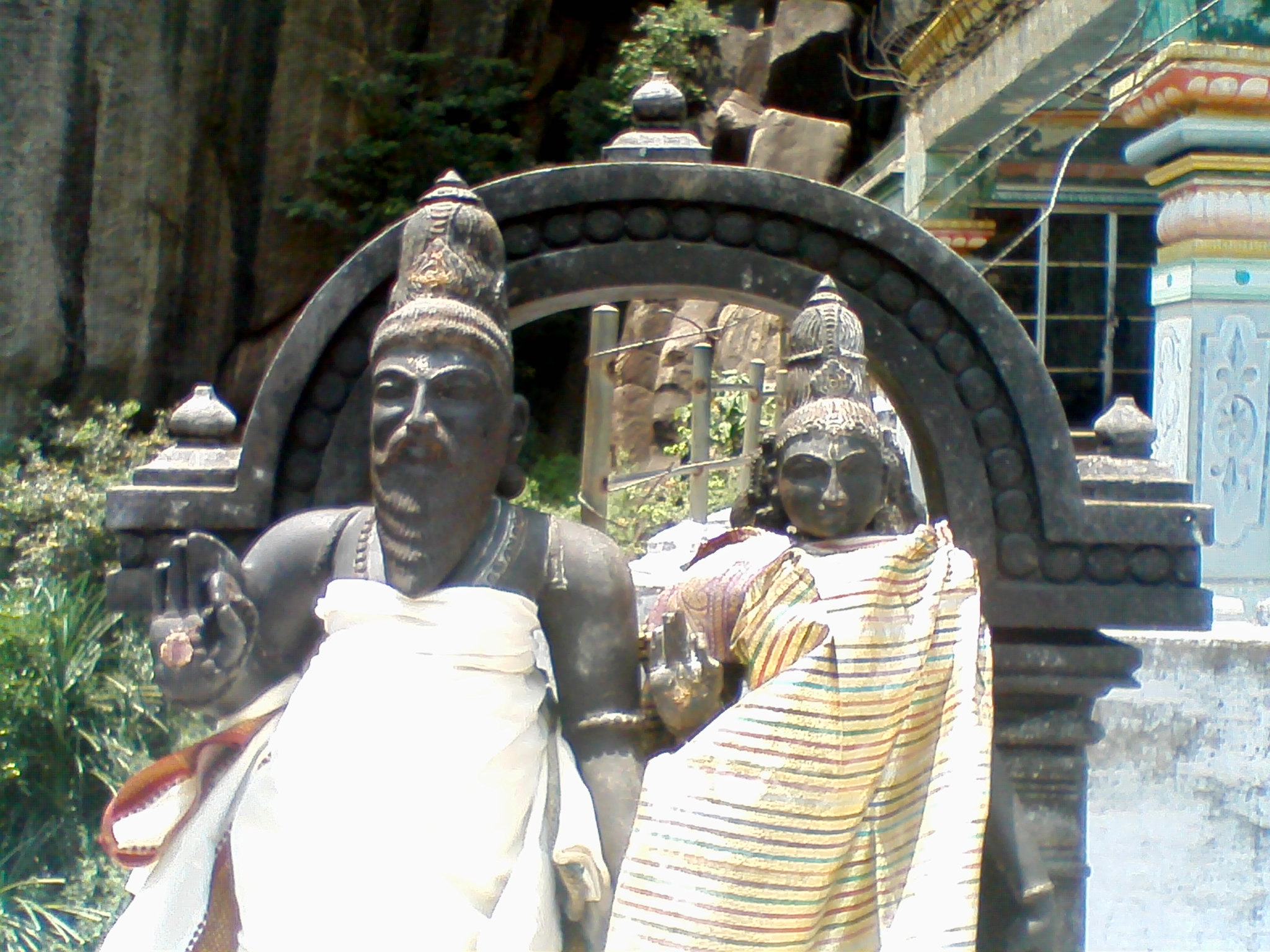
Image of sage Agasthya with his wife

As per Hindu legend, during the divine wedding of Shiva and Parvathi, there was heavy crowd at Kailash, the abode of Shiva. Sage Agasthya could not view event and prayed to Shiva at this place to get him a view of the event. Pleased by his devotion, Shiva appeared to the sage and his wife Lopamundra along with Parvathi in his marriage attire. Shiva made the place his abode and came to be called Kutralanathar. Tamiraparani River reaches is descent in flat land at this place. As per another legend, sage Urosamar floated a set of flowers in the river and the first flower reached the shore at this place. The sage established a temple for Kutralathanathar and worshipped the deity here.

As per another legend, the king of celestial deities, Indra slayed a demon Dwastha, the son of Sukracharya (the Guru of Asuras, the demons) as he was performing a penance to seek superior powers against the Devas. Indra incurred Brahmatti Dosha, a sin attained for slaying the Brahmin. He roamed around a lot of places for doing penance and finally on the advice of Brihaspathi, he landed at Papanasam. Since his sin (Papam locally) was expiated in this place, it came to be known as Papanasam.

== Temple structure ==
The temple has a conch-shaped temple (prakaram (closed precincts of a temple)) plan and is referred to as Sangakkovil. In the shrine, Shiva showed himself as Brahma and Vishnu. The presiding deity lord Shiva is called as Kuttralanathar and the Ambal-his consort (Parvathy) is called as Kuzhalvaimozhiammai. The Tirikootamandapam here is the site of festivities here. Another shrine of Parvati (Parasakthi) is also of significance here and is regarded as one of the 64 Shakti Peethams. The Chitra Sabhai or the hall of pictures is located in a picturesque locale away from the main temple. Architecturally the Chitrasabha resembles that of the other Nataraja Sabhas elsewhere in Tamil Nadu, and its interior is decked with hundreds of murals, depicting images from the Indian epics. Natarajar is brought here during festivals from the Kurumpalaveesar temple. The sthala vriksham is Kurum Palaa and the Theertham is Chitranadhi. Nataraja is sported with Nritya Thandavam posture.

== Poems on this temple ==
Tirikootaraasappa kavirayar's well known work Kutrala Kuravanji glorifies this shrine. Kurumpalaveesar, sung in Tevaram was done by Sambandar. It is one of the shrines of the 275 Paadal Petra Sthalams.

== Festivals ==
Arudra Darisanam is celebrated in the Chitrasabha, and the Taandava Deepa Aradhanai carried out then is of significance here. In the annual festival Shiva appears as Bhrama, Vishnu, Rudra, Eswara, Sadasiva and Subramanya. Other festivals celebrated here are Vasanta Utsavam in Chittirai, Pavitrotsavam in Kartikai, Navaratri, Skanda Sashti, Chittirai Vishu and Aippasi Vishu. The ivory chariot used in processions is of great beauty.

== Location ==
This temple is located roughly 5 km from Tenkasi. Tenkasi is connected with other parts of Tamil Nadu both by road and Train. Tenkasi can easily be reached by bus from Madurai and Tirunelveli. Bus services from Tenkasi to Courtalam are available. From Kerala through Punalur we can reach Courtalam.
