= Thiruvalangadu =

Village near Chennai, Tamil Nadu, India

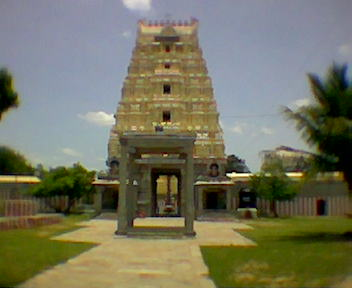

- Location in Tamil Nadu

Religion
- Affiliation: Hinduism
- Deity: Vadavaraneshwarar(Shiva) Vandar Kuzhalai(Parvathi)

Location
- Location: Tamil Nadu, India
- State: Tamil Nadu
- Country: India
- Coordinates: 13°7′48″N 79°46′30″E

Architecture
- Type: Dravidian architecture

Thiruvalangadu is a village in the western suburbs of Chennai, India. The railway station is located on the Chennai-Arakkonam Route, the penultimate station before Arakkonam.

Sri Vadaranyeswarar Temple is situated at a distance of 5 km from the station. It can also be accessed by road on NH205 (Chennai-Avadi-Tiruvallur-Renigunta route). A slight detour of about 6 km from NH205 on to the left takes one to the temple town of Thiruvalangadu.

Sri Tazhuvikuzhandheswarar Temple is another big temple located about two kilometer far south-easterly to Vedaranyeswarar Temple.

This village is the birthplace of the great Saint Pattinathar

== The temple ==
The Thiruvaalangadu temple, built by the Cholas during the 12th century CE (though inscriptions evidence the 5th century CE), is regarded as a sacred Shaivaite temple in that it is one of the 5 majestic cosmic dance halls (pancha sabhai) of Lord Shiva, known as "Ratna Sabai". The other 4 "Sabais" are Chidambaram Nataraja Temple- Kanaka Sabhai, Meenakshi Amman Temple (Madurai - Rajatha Sabhai), Coutrallam Thirukutralam - Chitra Sabha and Nellaiappar Temple (Tirunelveli - Thamira Sabhai). Legend has it that when the Lord was once entranced in a deep cosmic dance, the jewels from the Lord's anklets fell onto the earth and scattered in 5 places, Thiruvalangadu being one of them. It is one of the 32 Saiva temples in Tondai Nadu which have been sung in the devaarams. The site is one of the 275 celebrated Shaivaite sites in TN ("Padal Petra Stalam"). This temple is amongst the greatest Shiva Temples of Tamil Nadu.

The temple is known not only for its architectural splendour, but also for the legends associated with mallikarjuna. The primary deity at the Sanctum is known as "Vadaranyeswarar" (Vada - meaning north and aaranyam - meaning forest and Eswarar - referring to Lord Siva)) and the Lord's consort, "Vandarkuzhali Amman" ('VaaNdaarkuzhali': meaning the one whose locks attract beetles - to suck honey from the flowers that decorate it). Thiruvaalangadu also houses the Rathinasabai - which is one of the panchasabais (pancha - meaning five, and sabais meaning stage / dias), for Lord Nataraja. The sthala Vriksham is a large banyan tree located behind the sanctum on the North East. It is here in this temple that Lord Shiva requested the great Karaikkal Ammeiyar (Peyar) to undertake a marathon walk to Mount Kailash on her head and be an omnipresent witness to his cosmic dance.

The temple is complete in all respects in accordance with the traditional Cholan temple architecture that is typical of a Shaivaite shrine. The shrine's importance is enhanced by the mystic location of the temple on what was once a forest of banyan trees. The temple also sports a Large tank as well.

Shivraathri (during Makara) and Thiruvadirai (during Dhanur) festivals are celebrated in a grand manner in this temple.

Saints Sambanthar has sung one pathigam (a form of poetry), Appar two pathigams and Sundarar one pathigam in praise of the Lord at Thiruvaalangadu. Kaaraikaal Ammaiyar, one of the foremost of the 63 devotees of Lord Siva, who sought and obtained a ghost form and added the signature of 'Kaaraikaal Pei' (the ghost of Kaariakaal) to her poetry, is said to have walked into this place on her head - considering even the soil around too holy to be stepped on. She has composed the famous 'Moothathirupadhigam', the 'Thiruirrattaimanimalai' and the 'Arpudhathiruvandhadhi' in praise of the Lord. Shs attained spiritual bliss and salvation at Thiruvaalangadu and it is believed that she still sits beneath the Lord's feet, singing his glory when He dances.

At the Rathinasabai the Lord is seen with his consort, Goddess Sivagami on His right and Kaaraikaal Ammayar singing on his left.

Sri Viswaroopa Panchamukha Hanuman ashram is located at Tiruvallur, next to Tiruvalangadu. A 40-foot-tall (12 m) Sri Panchamukha Hanuman has been installed in this ashram as per mantra shastra.

=== Pancha Sabhai Sthalangal ===
The temples where Shiva is believed to have performed the Cosmic Dance.

Category	Temple	Location	Element
Rathinachabai	Vada Aaranyeswarar Temple	Thiruvalangadu, Thiruvallur, Chennai	Ruby
Porchabai	Natarajar Temple	Chidambaram	Gold
Vellichabai	Meenakshi Amman Temple	Madurai	Silver
Thamirachabai	Nellaiappar Temple	Tirunelveli	Copper
Chithirachabai	Kutralanathar Temple	Thirukutralam	Art
