= Tamil Nadu Tourism Development Corporation =

Indian state tourism agency

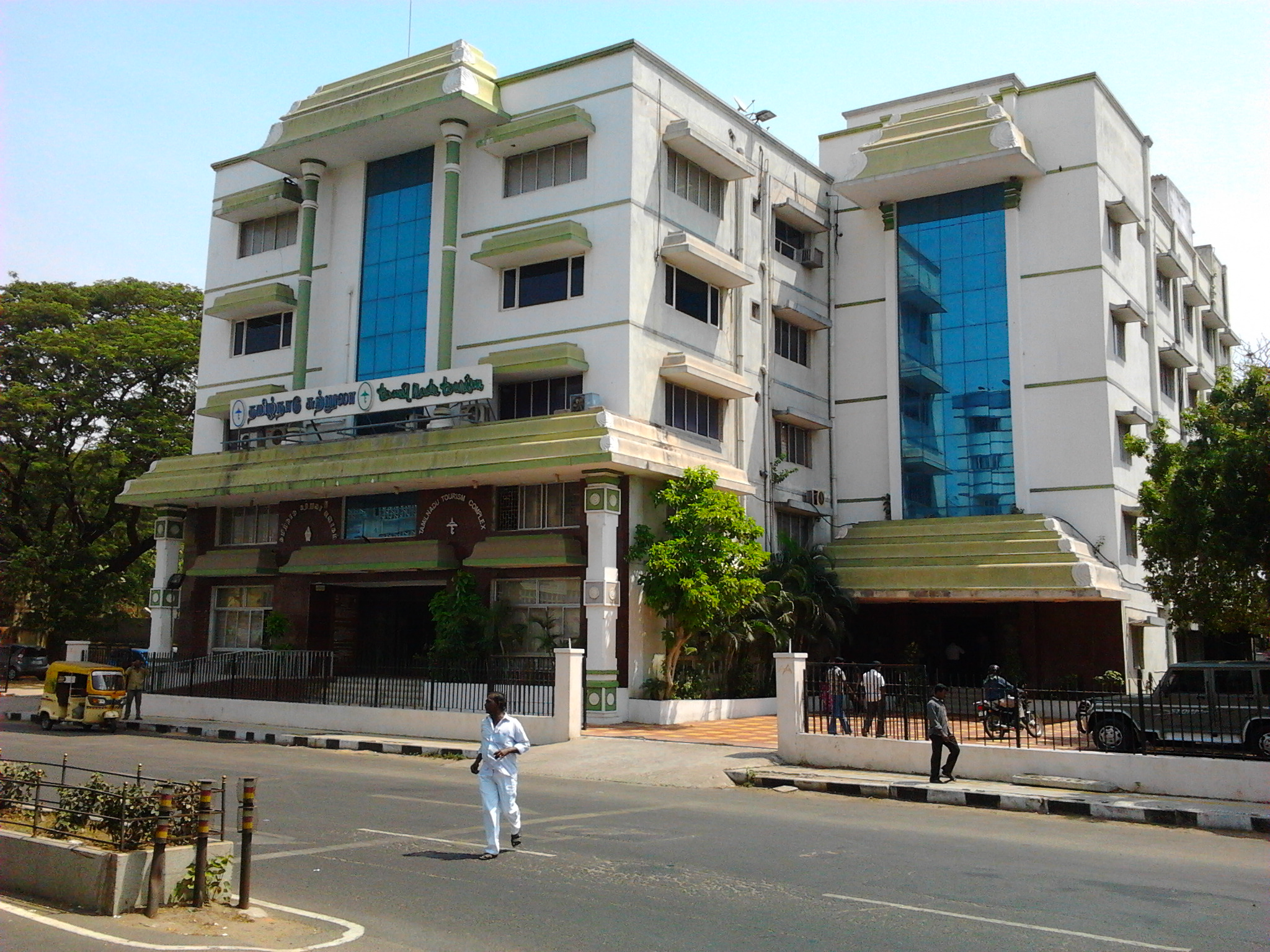
- Company type: Government of Tamil Nadu's Public Sector Undertaking
- Industry: Tourism, Ecotourism, Hotel Management
- Founded: July 1971
- Headquarters: Chennai, Tamil Nadu, India
- Area served: Tamil Nadu, India
- Key people: Mr. T. CHRISTURAJ IAS (Managing Director)
- Owner: Government of Tamil Nadu
- Parent: Tourism, Culture and Religious Endowments Department
- Website: http://www.tamilnadutourism.tn.gov.in

The Tamil Nadu Tourism Development Corporation is a state-government Public Sector Undertaking of the Government of Tamil Nadu located in the Indian state of Tamil Nadu. It is managed by the Tourism, Culture and Religious Endowments Department and was established in July 1971. It is the nodal agency responsible for the promotion of tourism and development of tourist related infrastructure in the state.

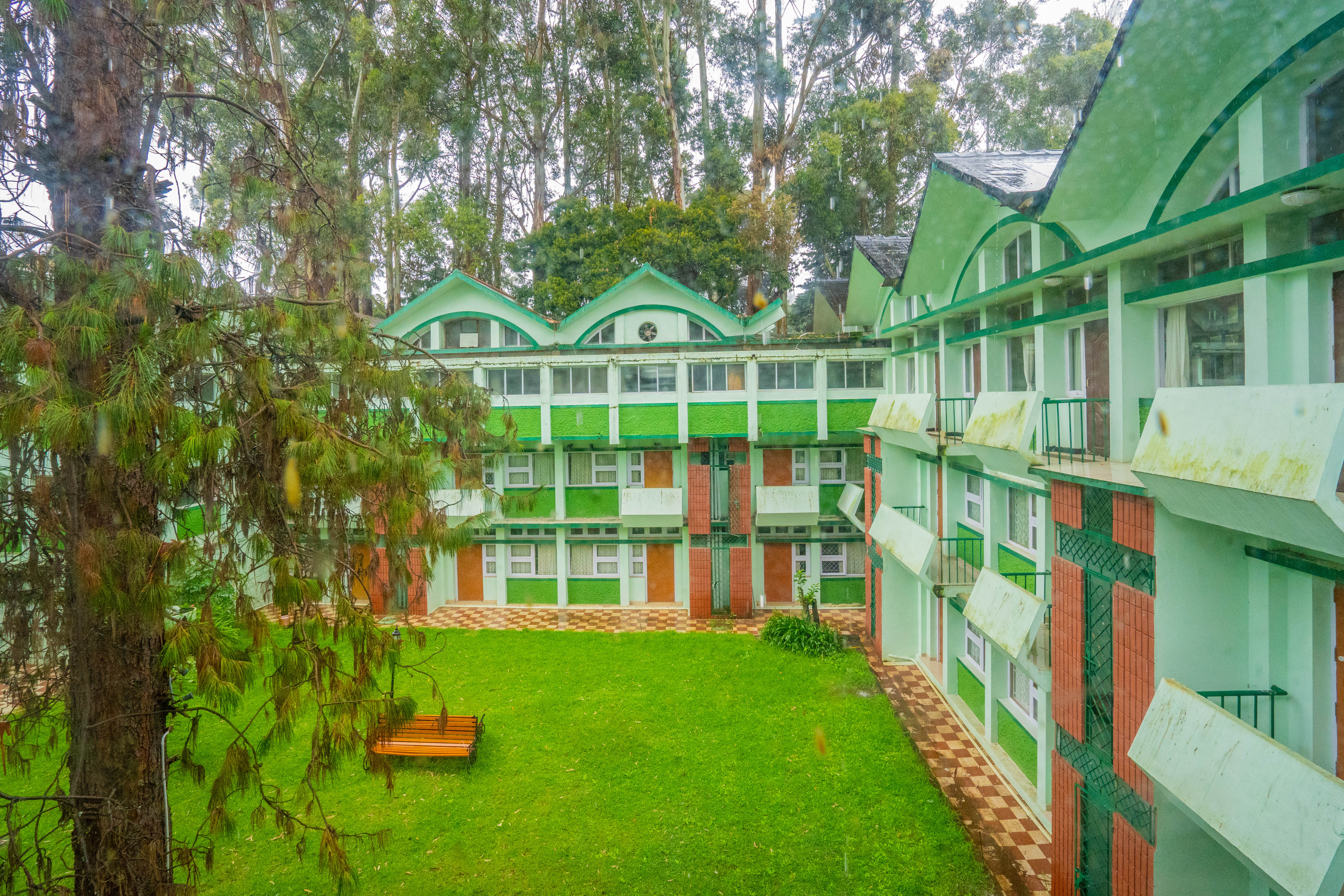
Hotel Tamil Nadu - OOTY

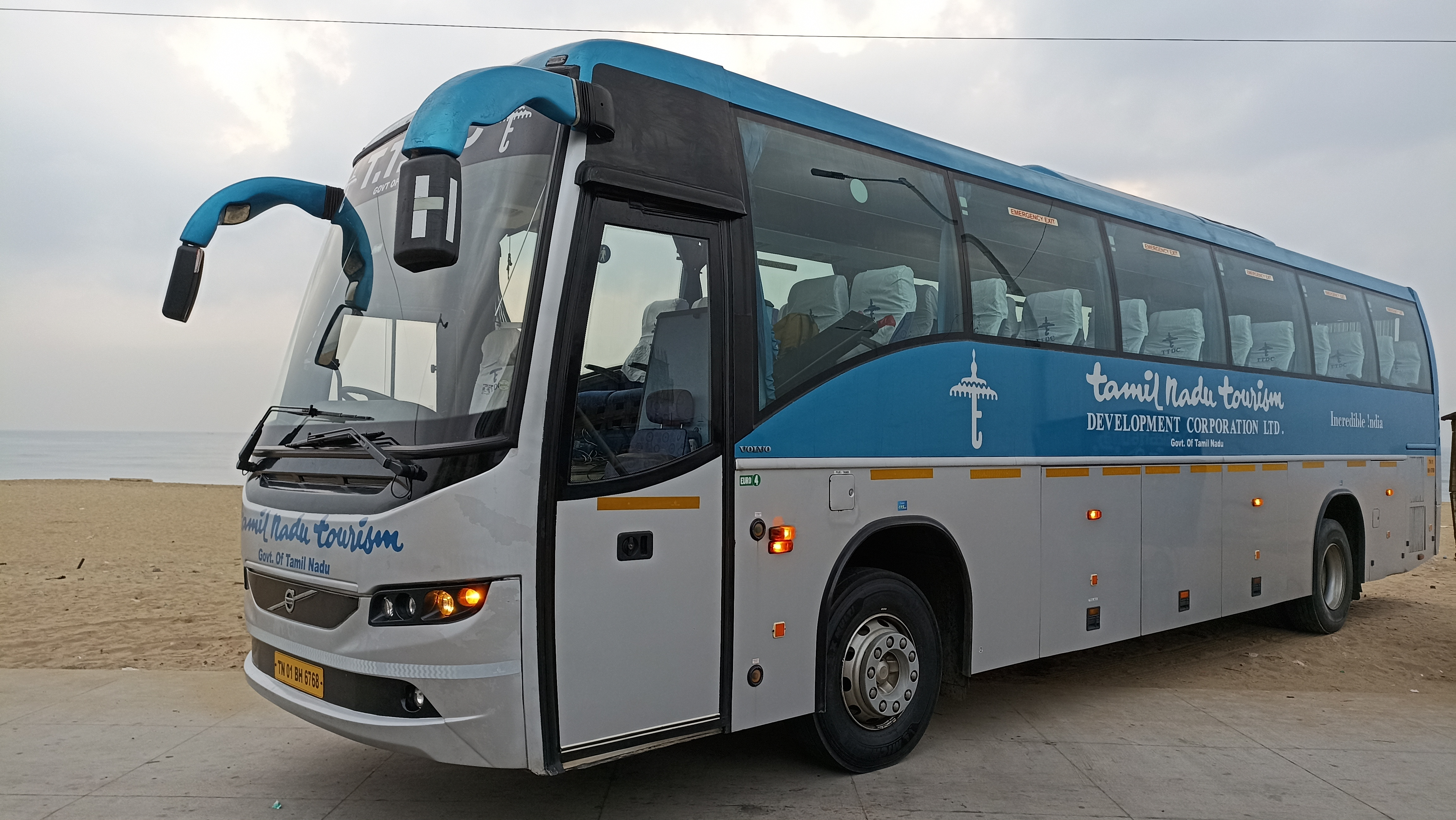
TTDC Luxury Volvo Bus

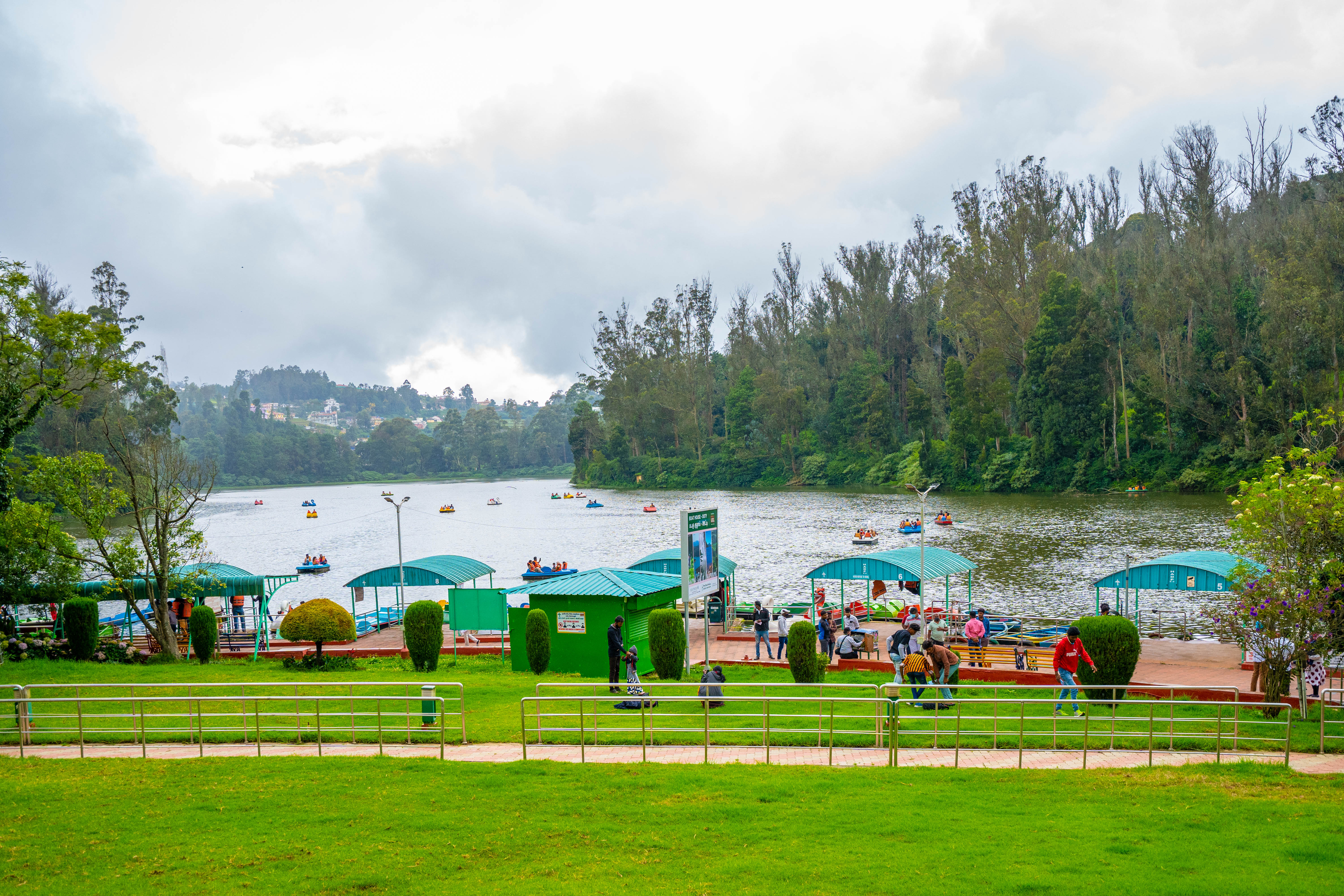
OOTY Boathouse
