= Pethia nigripinna =

Conservation status
- Least Concern (IUCN 3.1)

Scientific classification
- Kingdom: Animalia
- Phylum: Chordata
- Class: Actinopterygii
- Order: Cypriniformes
- Family: Cyprinidae
- Subfamily: Smiliogastrinae
- Genus: Pethia
- Species: P. nigripinna

Binomial name
- Pethia nigripinna Knight, Rema Devi, Indra & Arunachalam, 2012

Species of fish

Pethia nigripinna, the black fin barb, is a species of cyprinid fish found in the Moyar River drainage in the Nilgiris and the Kalindi Stream in the southern Western Ghats. This species can reach a length of 4.5 centimetres (1.8 in) SL.
