= Sigur Plateau =

Sigur Plateau Nilgiri North Division
- Reserve forest
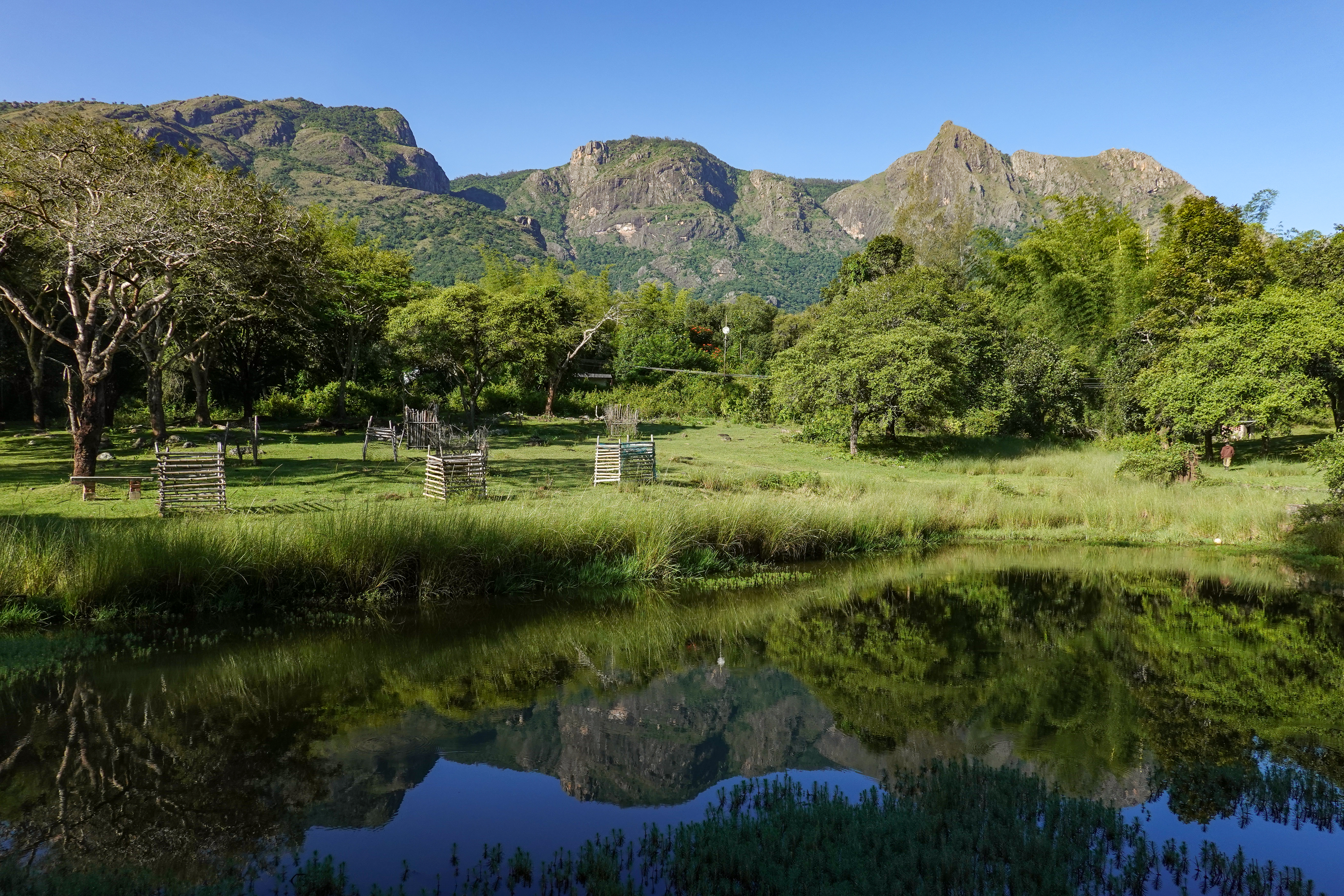
- Sigur Plateau, Nilgiris range visible in the distance (view south)

- Location in Tamil Nadu, India Sigur Plateau (India)
- Coordinates: 11°31′3″N 76°47′16″E
- Country: India
- State: Tamil Nadu
- Region: Nilgiri Hills
- District: Nilgiri

Area
  - Total: 778.8 km^{2} (300.7 sq mi)
- Elevation: 900 m (3,000 ft)

Languages
  - Official: Tamil
- Time zone: UTC+5:30 (IST)
- Nearest city: Ootacamund
- IUCN category: VI
- Adjacent to: W-Mudumalai National Park & Wynad Wildlife Sanctuary, NW Bandipur National Park & Nagarhole National Park, N-Mysore District, NE-Sathyamangalam Wildllife Sanctuary & Biligiriranga Hills Wildlife Sanctuary, S-Ootacamund.
- Governing body: Tamil Nadu Forest Dept
- Topographic map: Nilgiri North Reserved forests
- Climate: Am (Köppen)
- Avg. summer temperature: 32 °C (90 °F)
- Avg. winter temperature: 10 °C (50 °F)

Sigur Plateau (Segur Plateau) is a plateau in the north and east of Nilgiri District in the Nilgiri Hills of Tamil Nadu, southern part of India. It covers the 778.8 square kilometres (300.7 sq mi) portion of the Moyar River drainage basin on the northern slopes of the Nilgiri Hills, south of the Moyar River.

The Sigur Plateau is notable as an important wildlife corridor in the Western Ghats to sustain elephant and tiger numbers and their genetic diversity.

It is an important link between several contiguous protected areas forming the Nilgiri Biosphere Reserve, the largest protected forest area in India. This area supports over 6,300 elephants, that represents the largest single population of elephants and tigers in India.

The Nilgiri Biosphere Reserve, which includes Sigur Plateau and the Nilgiri Hills, is part of the UNESCO World Network of Biosphere Reserves. The Western Ghats, the Nilgiri Sub-Cluster (more than 6,000 square kilometres (2,316.6 sq mi)), including all of Mudumalai National Park and the reserve forests of the Sigur Plateau, is under consideration by the UNESCO World Heritage Committee for selection as a World Heritage Site.

A proposal has been initiated to notify Sigur and adjoining forest areas as a wildlife sanctuary for Vultures.

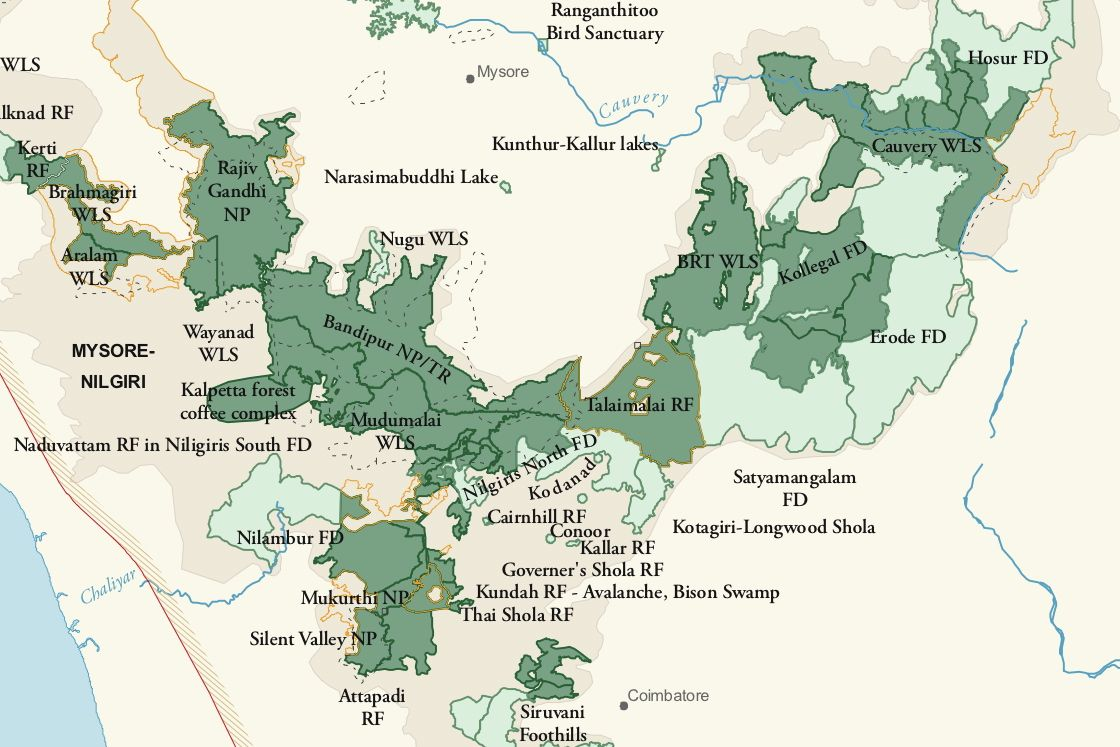
Map of Nilgiris Biosphere Reserve, showing Sigur Plateau (Nilgiris North) in relation to multiple contiguous protected areas

== History ==
In the late 1700s, Tipu Sultan maintained a fort and trading route between the Kingdom of Mysore and Travancore, along the Moyar River here.

In May 1859, a small monthly sanction was granted by the Government for the conservation and working of Sigur Forest. With only a small a sum to commence with, it was some time before any wood could be collected. However, the means for working the forest on a larger scale were obtained by an early sale of sandal wood, However, by this time the Conservator of Forests of Madras Presidency, Dr. Hugh Cleghorn stated that "This forest has been much exhausted by a succession of unscrupulous contractors, and there is very little teak or Bombay Blackwood (Rosewood) at present fit for felling. It is important that the forest should be allowed to recover, as it is the main source of supply to Utakamund for house-building purposes."

In 1954, a young man-eating male Bengal tiger named the "Tiger of Segur" killed 5 people between Sigur and Anaikatty villages in the Sigur Plateau. In 1954, the tiger was still classified as vermin in the Nilgiri Hills. As agriculture expanded and tiger habitat shrank, Tamil Nadu stopped all tiger hunting in the Sigur reserve in 1965.

On 26 August 2010, Jairam Ramesh the Indian Minister of State for Environment and Forests asked Chief Minister of Tamil Nadu M Karunanidhi for the Tamil Nadu government to favourably consider a proposal from his ministry to declare the Sigur Plateau in the Nilgiris as a buffer zone of the Mudumalai National Park.

== Geography ==
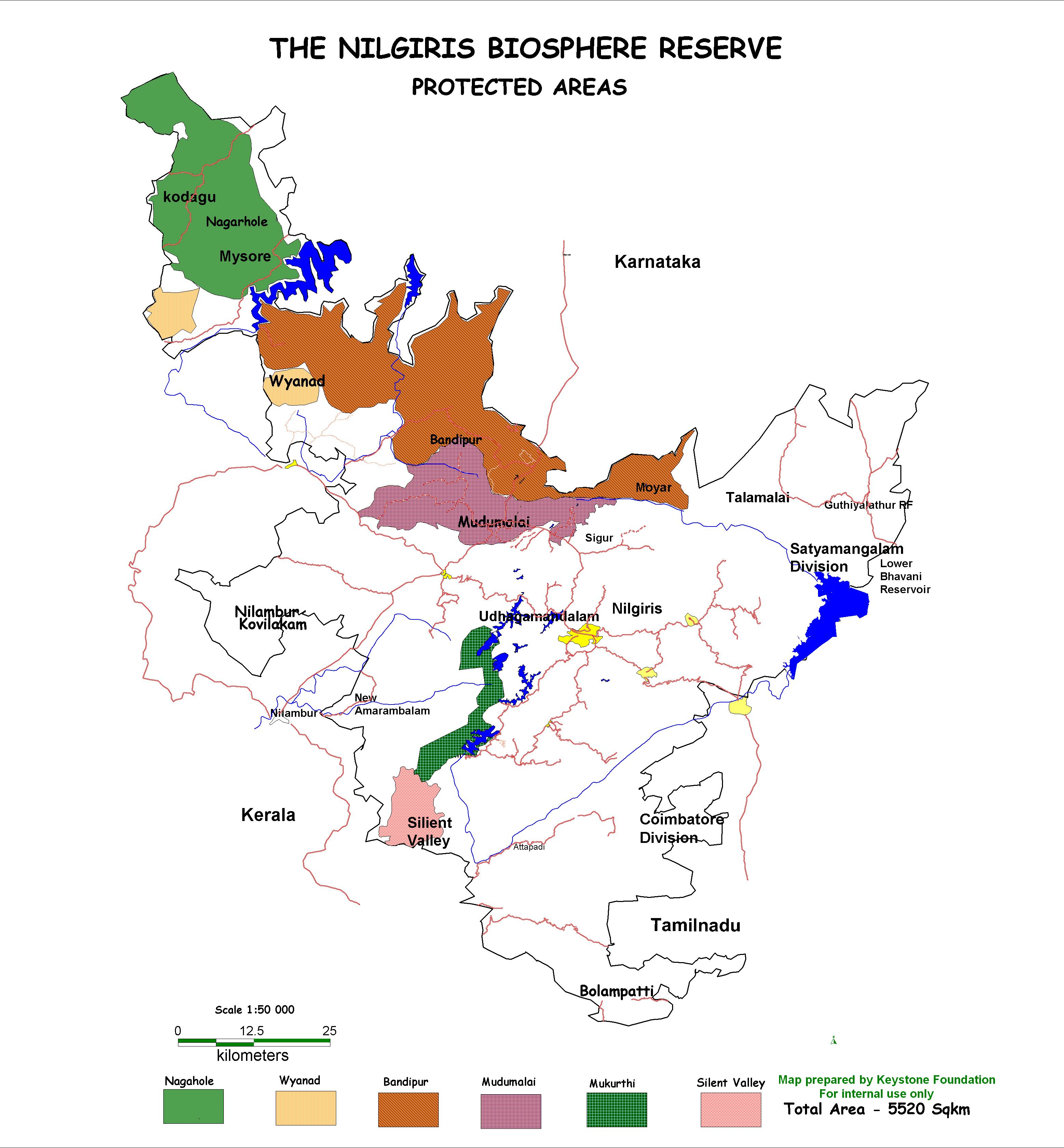
Segar Plateau in relation to other protected areas in Nilgiris Biosphere Reserve

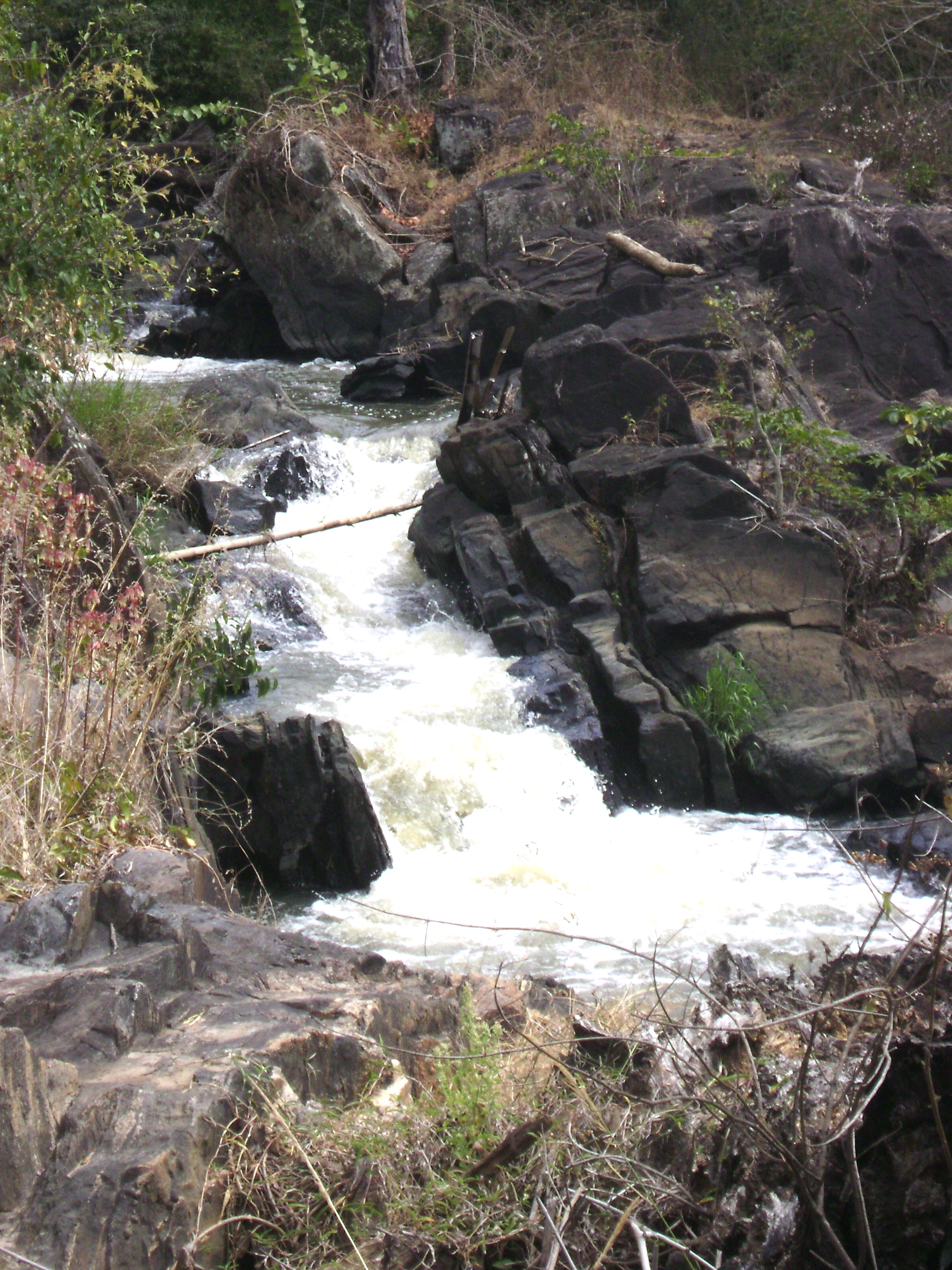
Moyer River at Theppakadu

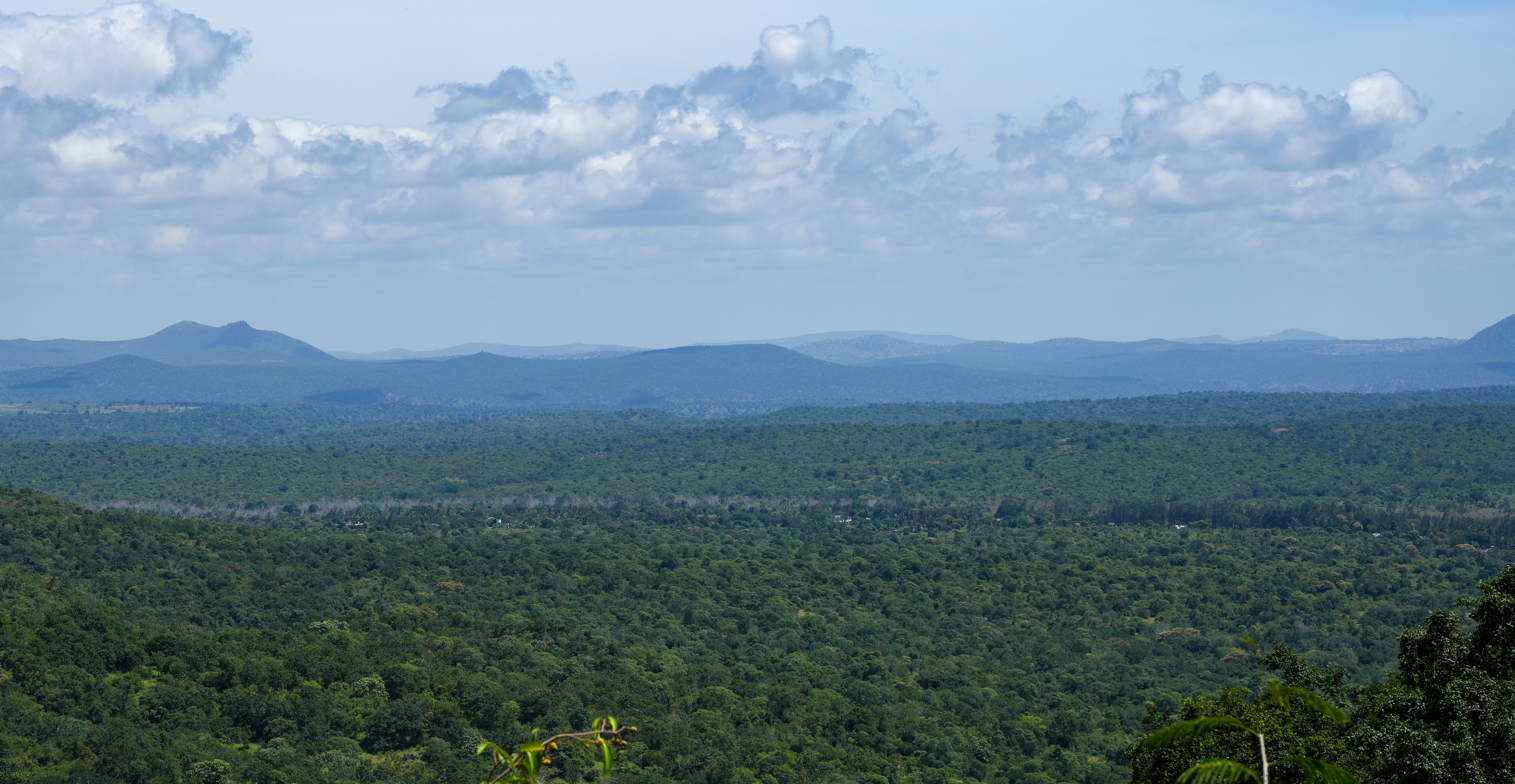
View of Mudumalai Tiger Reserve from the Sigur Ghat road

Sigur Plateau comprises about 448.3 km^{2} (173.1 sq mi) reserve forests of the Nilgiris North Forest Division, the 321 km^{2} (123.9 sq mi) Mudumalai National Park and about 16.2 km^{2} (6.3 sq mi) of private lands. The Nilgiris North Forest Division includes the Sigur Range 257.3 km^{2} (99.3 sq mi), Coonoor Range176.7 km^{2} (68.2 sq mi) and the Udhagai North Range 14.3 km^{2} (5.5 sq mi), which are in turn divided into the Kambatti reserve forest, the Sigur reserve forest, the Kalhatti Slopes reserve forest, the Singara reserve forest, Bokkapuram reserve forest, Moyar reserve forest and Northern Hay reserve forest.

Sigur Plateau is located adjoining the Bandipur National Park to the northwest, Wayanad Wildlife Sanctuary to the west, and Sathyamangalam Wildlife Sanctuary and Nilgiris East ranges to the east. The north side of the plateau is defined by the Moyar River and the 260 metres (853 ft) deep Moyar Gorge. South of the Sigur Plateau is the higher Nilgiris Plateau.

Across the Moyar River, the Sigur Plateau is adjacent on the north to the Mysore Plateau, referred to as the Talamalai Range, bordered on the west by Nilgiri District, north by Mysore District, east by the Sattyamangalam Range and south by the Moyar River and Gorge.

Elevation in the plateau ranges from 280 metres (919 ft) at the Bhavani Sagar Reservoir and increases in the west to 1,880 metres (6,168 ft) at Konabetta Peak (Sigur Peak).

The five major streams in the Sigur plateau are the Moyar River, the Sigur River, the Avarahalla River, the Kedarhalla River and the Gundattihalla River, which originate in the Nilgiris plateau. The Sigur Plateau is an important watershed area for the Cauvery River and its ecological health is important to the many people dependent on the Cauvery.

The Sigur Ghat Road (SH 67) crosses the Sigur Plateau for 33 kilometres (20.5 mi) from Ooty to Theppakadu.

== Climate ==
The Sigur region is known for its moderate and pleasant climate. Average daytime temperatures vary from 32 °C (89.6 °F) in summer to 10 °C (50.0 °F) in Winter. Rainfall is locally variable, with the western part of the plateau lying in a rain shadow region, receiving less than 500 millimetres (19.7 in) annually, while the east part receives more than 1,000 millimetres (39.4 in) of rainfall.

== Flora and fauna ==
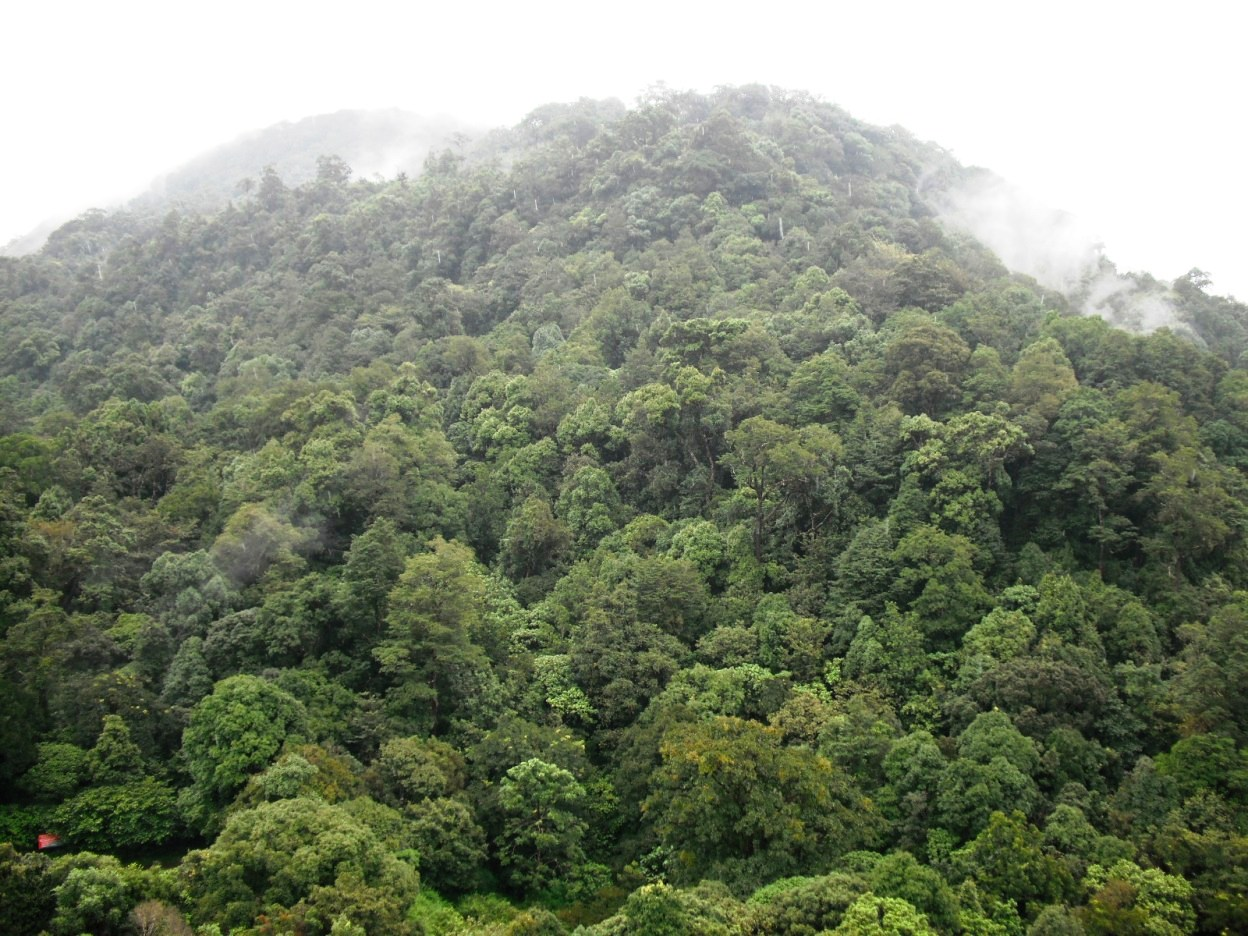
Forest after the rains in the Sigur plateau

The dominant forest type found here is Tropical rainforest. Montane forests, Tropical dry forests and Tropical moist forests are also found here. Some of the higher elevations of the plateau have montane grassland habitats. These forests are a haven to many endangered animals in the Western Ghats.

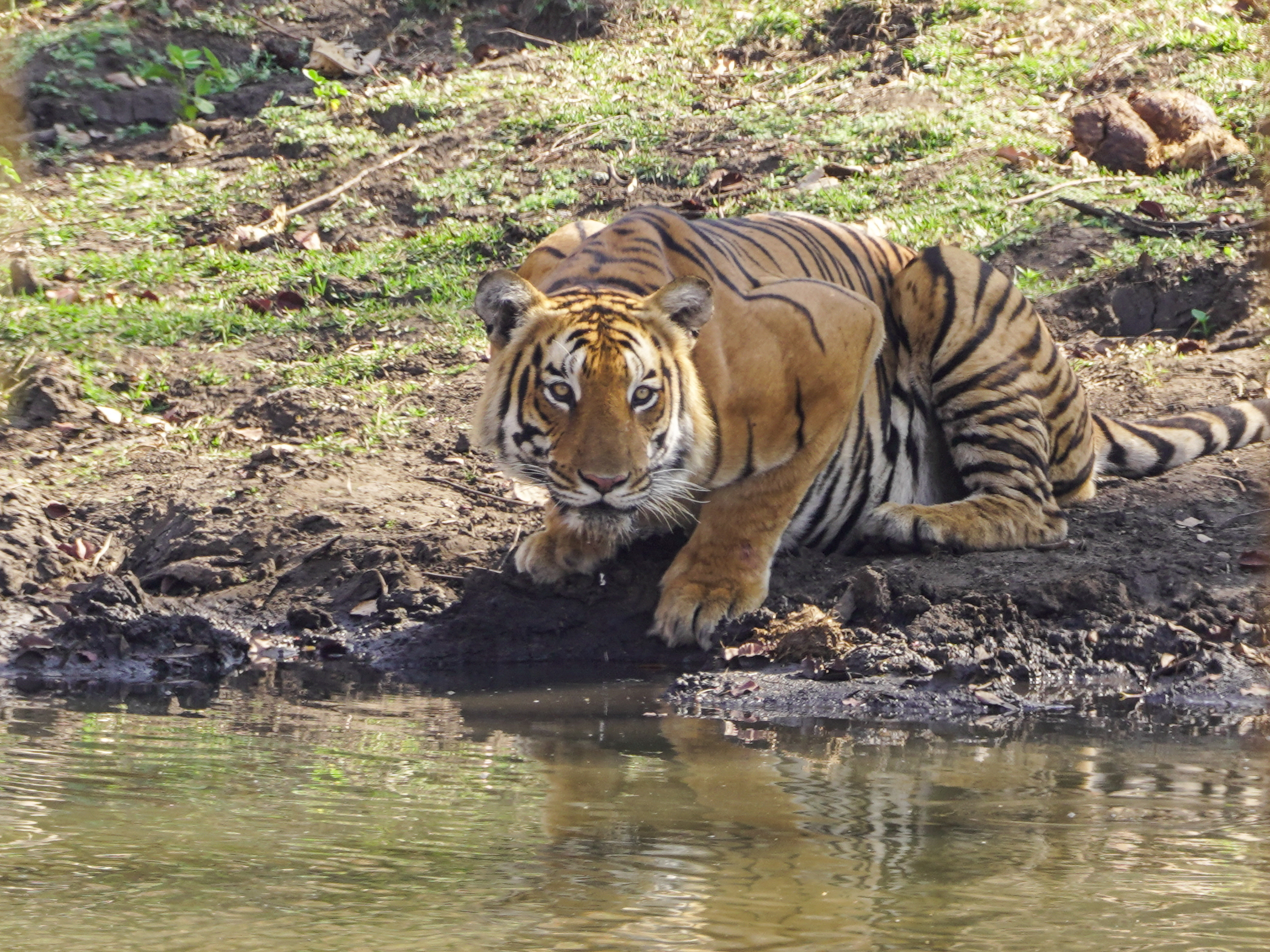
Tiger in Mudumalai, March 2021

The Sigur river valley acts as a crucial micro-habitat for herbivores, especially elephants, gaur and sambar and carnivores such as tiger, leopard, wild dog (dhole), and sloth bear for feeding, resting and denning. Smaller carnivores such as palm civet, small Indian civet, jungle cat, jackal and several species of mongoose also use this valley intensively for feeding, resting and denning.

Of the nine species of Vultures which exist in India, the critically endangered white-rumped vulture, long-billed vulture and king vulture (or) red-headed vulture and the endangered Egyptian vulture have been documented in the forests of Nilgiris Western Ghats landscape, which comprises the Sigur and Moyar Valleys. A proposal has been initiated to notify Sigur and adjoining forest areas as a wildlife sanctuary for vultures.

== Conservation ==
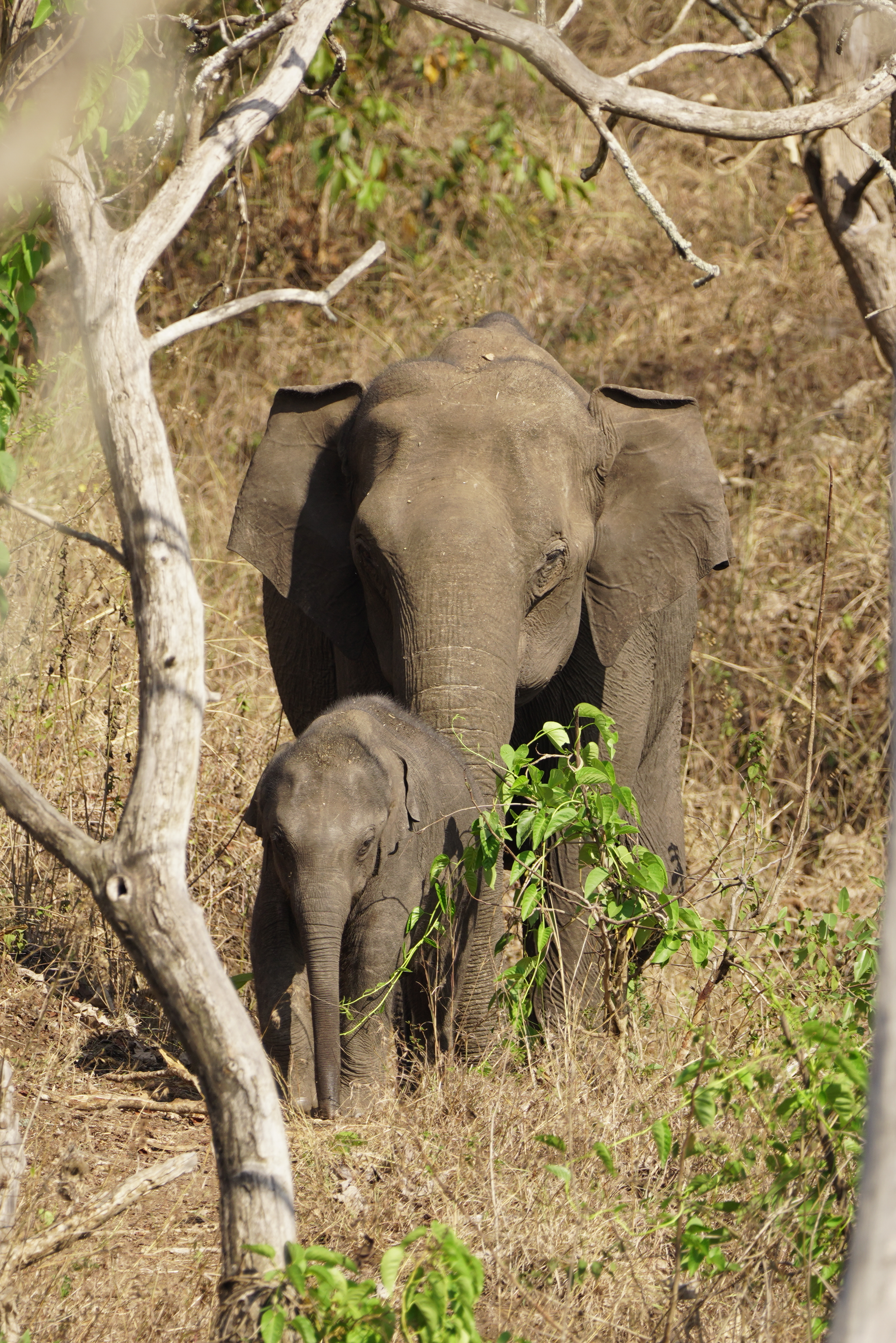
Female elephant and calf, Mudumalai, Mar '21

The Sigur Plateau has played a significant role in the mixing of elephant populations in the Western and Eastern Ghats. There is a considerable gene flow between the nearly 2,000 elephants in the Nilgiri Biosphere Reserve and the 1,800 in the Eastern Ghats, especially Sathyamangalam. Due to the Sigur wildlife corridor, the entire area has the highest elephant population in India. The Sigur Plateau contains several discrete elephant migration corridors, including: Kallar Elephant Corridor, Anaikatty Elephant Corridor, Vazhikadavu Elephant Corridor, Glencorin Elephant Corridor, Kaniyanpura - Moyar Elephant Corridor, Masinagudi-Moyar Elephant Corridor, Singara-Masinagudi Elephant Corridor, Mavinhalla-Chemmanatham Elephant Corridor and Greater Moyar Valley Corridor.

In 2010, Jairam Ramesh, Minister for Environment and Forests, stated to the Chief Minister of Tamil Nadu that "adding the Segur Plateau as a buffer to Mudumalai would strengthen the population status of tiger, its co-predators and prey in the landscape". The Tamil Nadu state government will initiate efforts to declare The Sigur Plateau as a buffer zone to Mudumalai National Park due to its importance as a wildlife corridor between the Western Ghats and the Eastern Ghats. This sanctuary declaration is expected to bolster wildlife conservation efforts, as the sanctuary managers will get financial support from the central government under Project Tiger.

== Culture ==
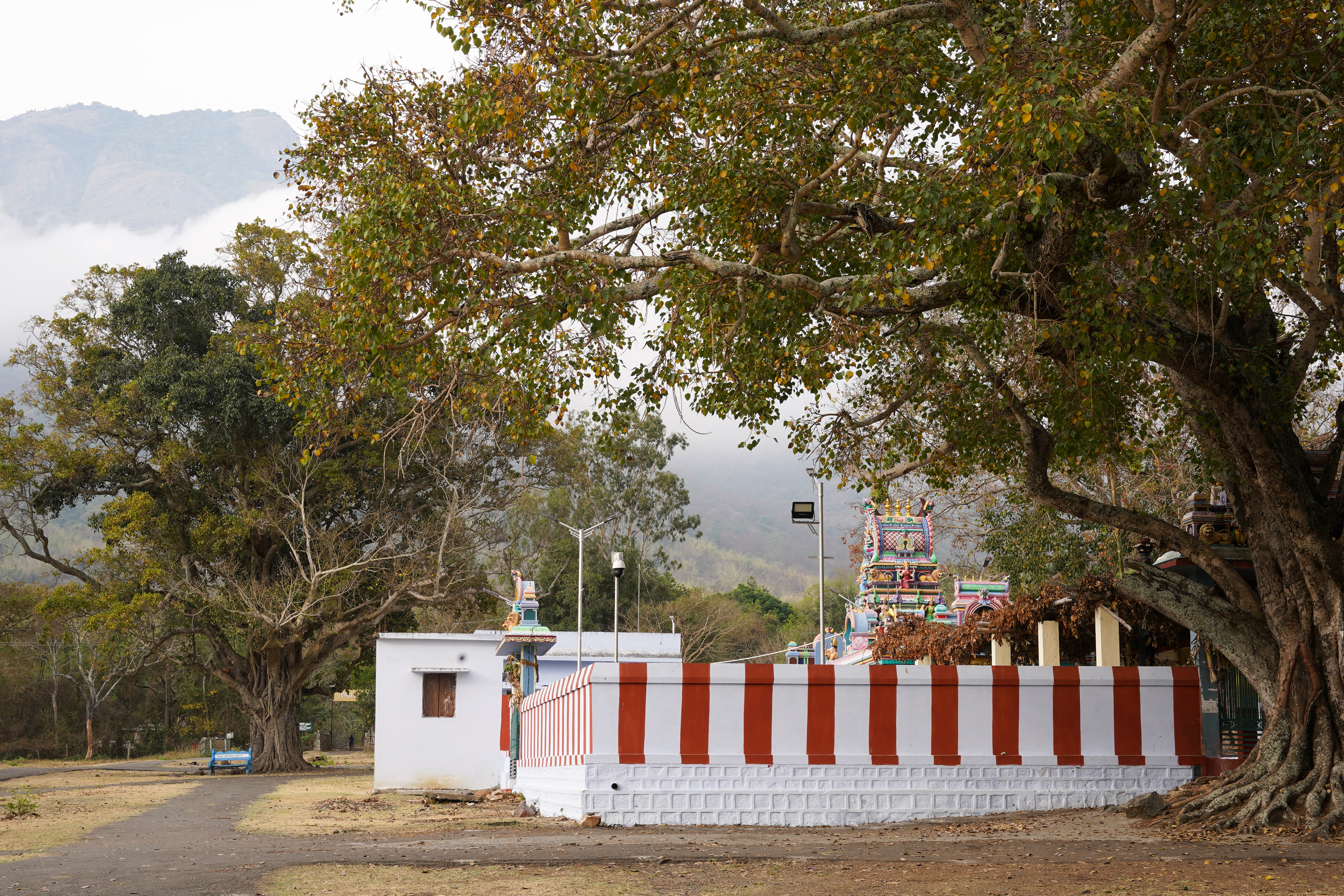
Bokkapuram Mariamman Temple, Nilgiris in background, Mar '21

These forests are home to indigenous tribal people belonging largely to the Kasaba sub-group of the Irular community. There are several tribal villages in the Sigur plateau. They include, from east to west: Sigur, Anaikatti, Chokkanalli, Vazhaithottam, Sholur, Masinagudi, Boothanatham, Mavanhalla, Bokkapuram, Hundi Moyar, Singhara, Tippakadu, Siriyur, Chamanatham and Kurumbarpallam. The Bokkapuram Mariamman Temple is the venue of an annual 5-day car festival. This draws hundreds to thousands of devotees.

The forests of Sigur, Singara and Nilgiris East ranges were also the territory of the notororius Indian bandit Koose Muniswamy Veerapan, who made a living poaching ivory and sandalwood from the forests and selling them on the black market. Much to the relief of local residents, officials and tourists, Veerapan was killed by Tamil Nadu Government in October 2004.

== Threats ==
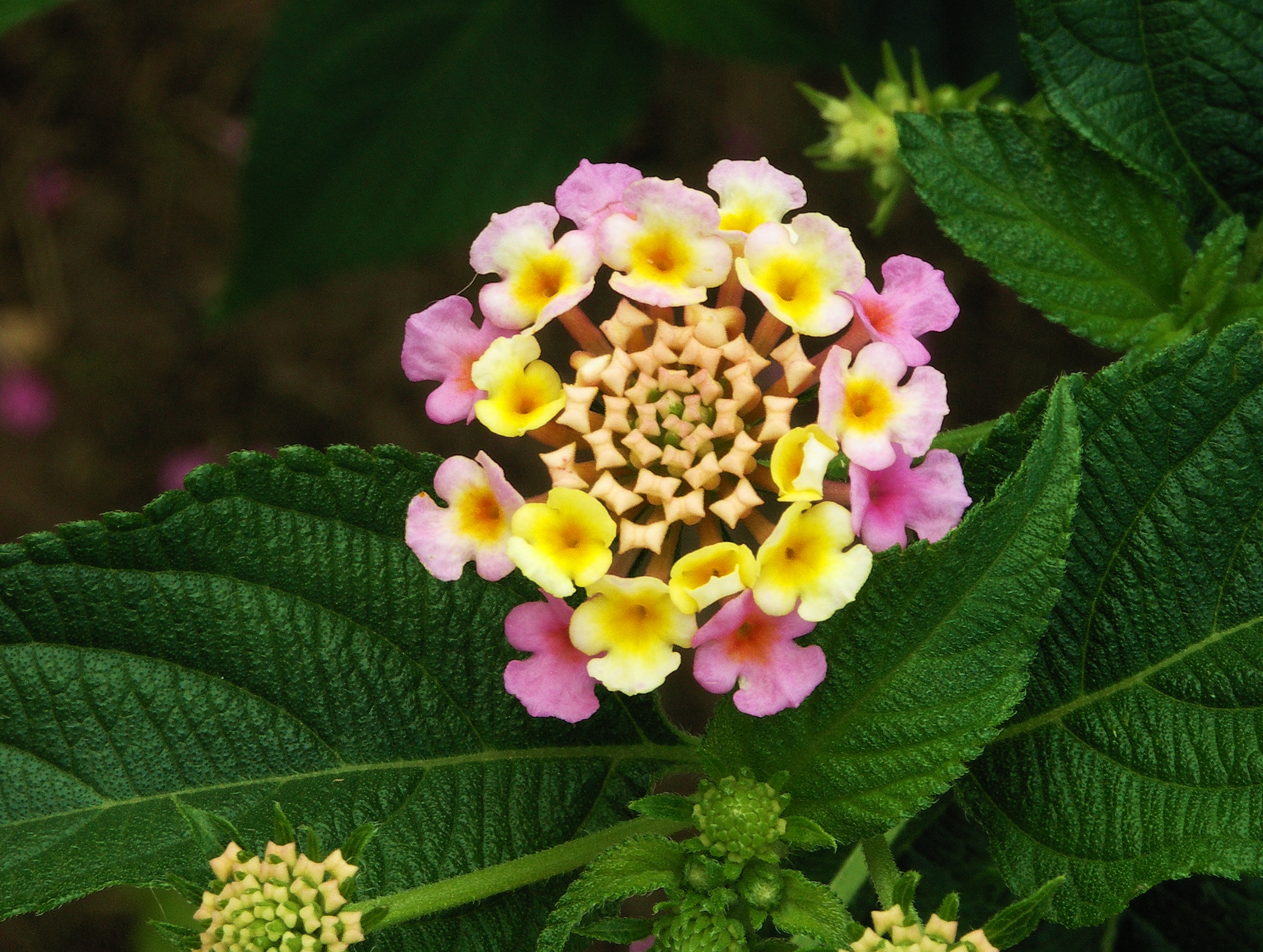
Invasive weed - Lantana camera

There are several major threats to the Sigur area caused mostly by expanding human population. These are cattle grazing, coffee and tea plantations and other crops cultivation, private tourist resorts, Invasive weeds, fuel wood collection, non-timber forest products (NTFP) collection, legal status of the corridor, and vehicular traffic particularly during night hours. An estimated 1,801 tons of firewood are collected from the Sigur Plateau annually. Weed species, especially Lantana camara but also Parthenium, Stachytarpheta indica, Dodonaea viscosa, Euphorbia antiquorum, and Opuntia dillennii are widely distributed and are invading and degrading the quality of forage on the plateau. The major impact of private resorts on the corridor areas are: fragmentation and destruction of habitats due to invasion of unpalatable weeds, loss of forest connectivity between habitats due new buildings construction and agriculture fields, including installation of barbed wire and electric fences, increasing rate of dependence by local communities on natural resources for fuel wood collection, cattle grazing, fresh water supply and waste disposal.

== Visitor activities ==
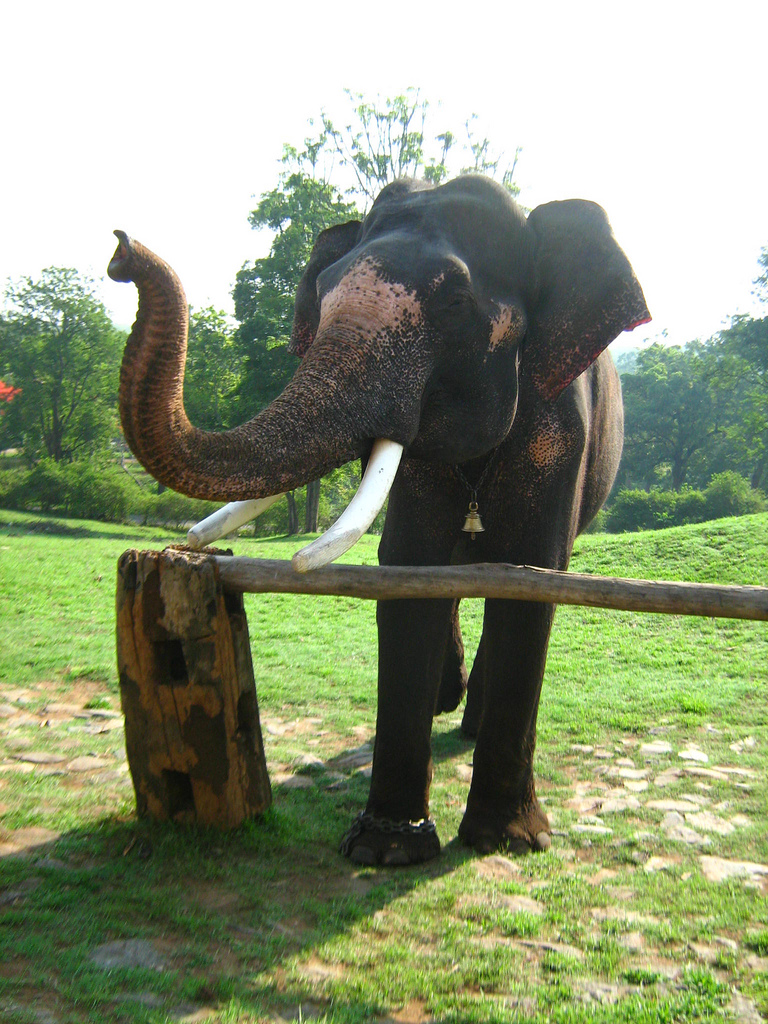
An elephant at the Theppakadu elephant camp

There are many visitor attractions in the Mudumalai park. Scenic spots are the Chief Minister's Watchtower, the view point at Kargudi, the Ombetta Lake and the Safari Van rides on Sand Road, Circular Road, Manradiar Road, Jayadev Avenue and Bombax Road. The public roads: Kakkanalli – Torapalli road, Teppakkadu – Masanagudi road and Moyar – Masanagudi road are also rewarding places to see wild life in the Sanctuary. The Moyar River running through a dense forest is a good place to see animals when they come to drink water from the river. The Moyar River Gorge, also called the Moyar Canyon, is a dramatic 20 km (12 mi) long gorge which plunges into the gorge below Theppakadu in a roaring water-fall popularly known as Moyar falls.

Good wildlife sighting opportunities are the Elephant Safari and Van Safari, conducted by the Tamil Nadu Forest Department departing from park headquarters at Theppakadu. One can interact with working elephants and see how they are fed at the Elephant Feeding Camp in Theppakadu. The captive elephants in the sanctuary are no longer used for timber extraction work. The elephants are now engaged mainly for Eco-tourism, patrolling for anti poaching operations, to control Man-Elephant conflict outside the sanctuary and as a conservation and training center for elephants which can be visited by public. Specimens of some animals who once lived in the Mudumalai Jungle are preserved in a museum near the Elephant feeding camp. Kallatty falls, located30 kilometres (18.6 mi) from Theppakadu, is a waterfall with a scenic view.

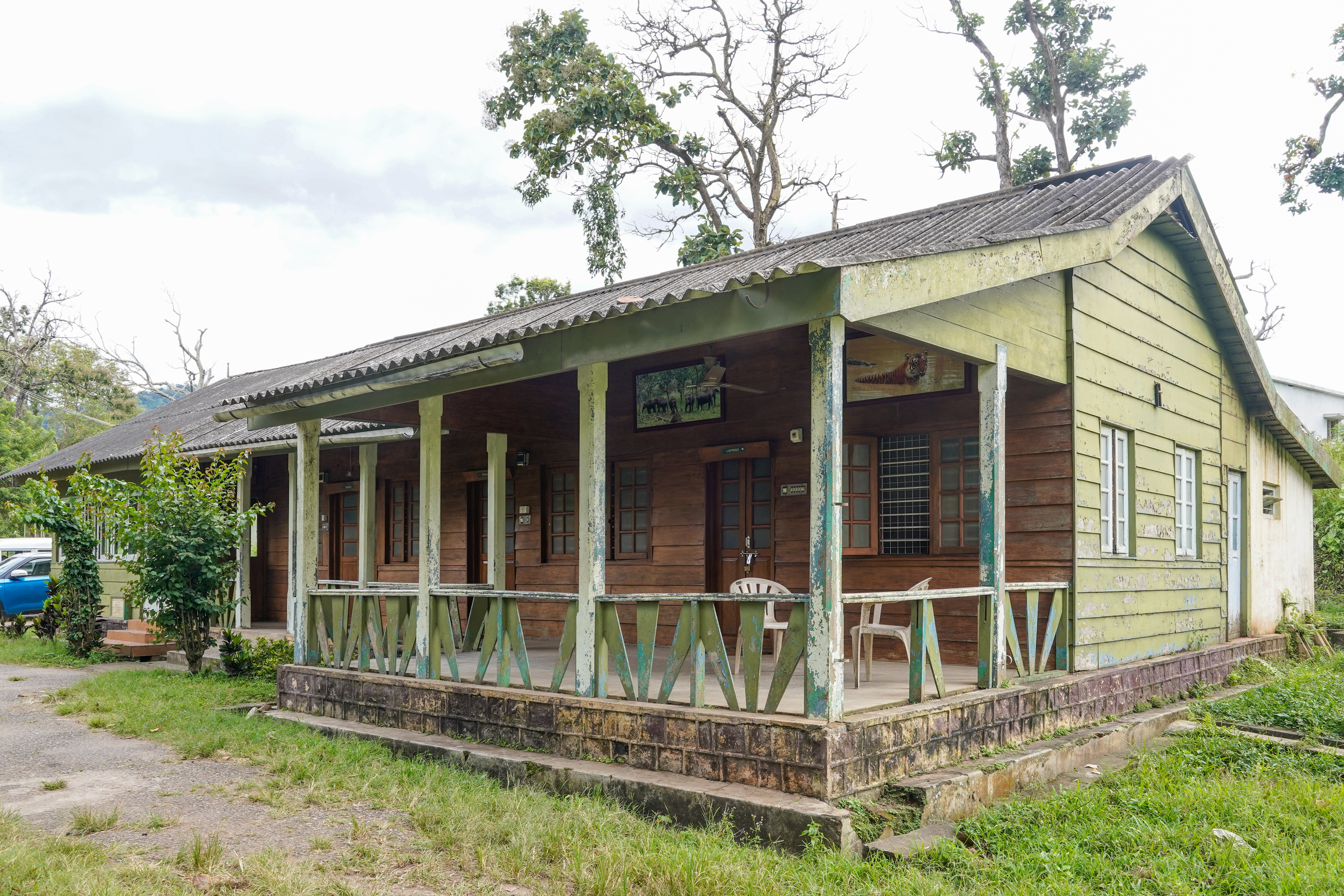
Forest Rest House -Theppakadu Log House, March 2021

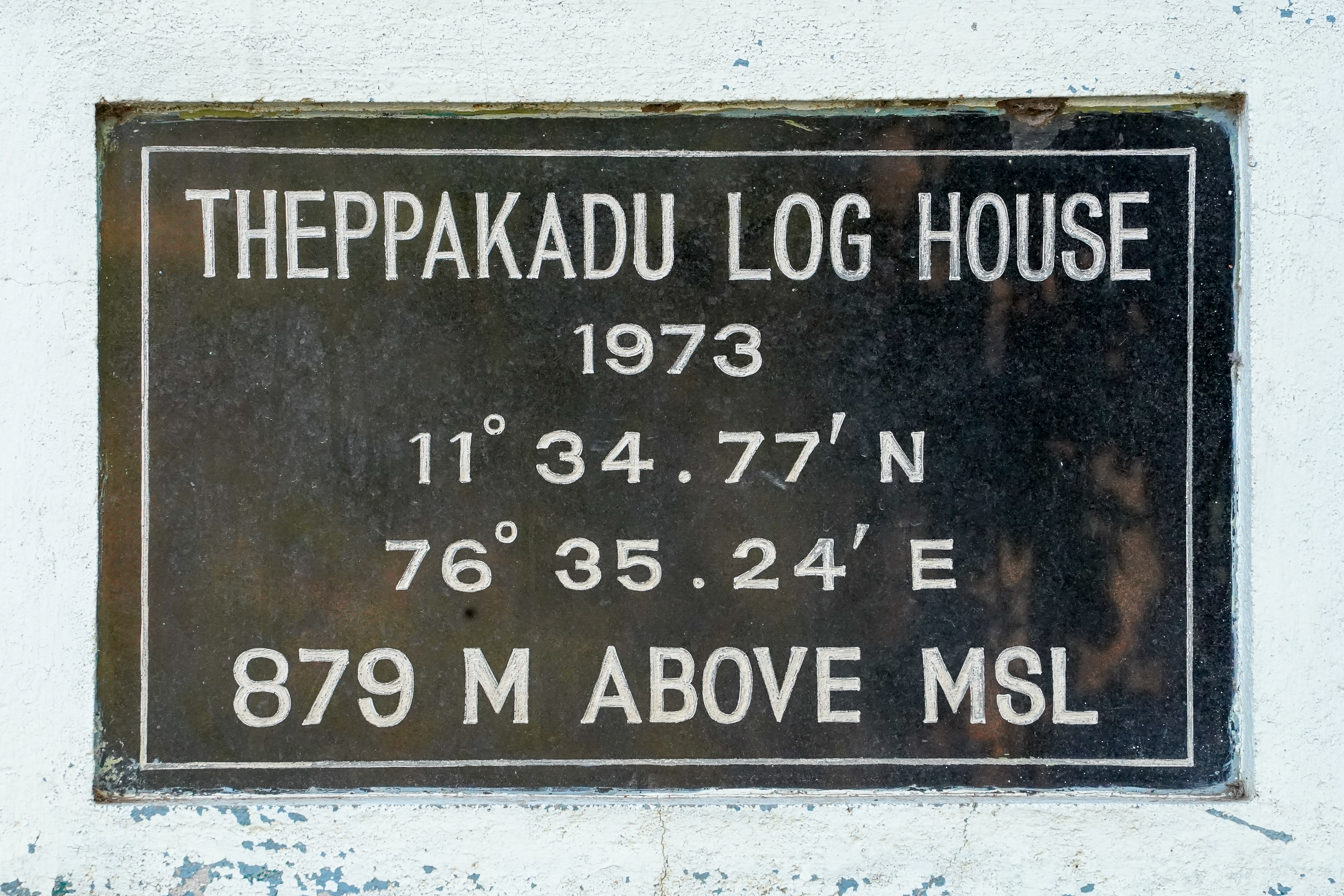
Theppakadu Log House sign

There are at least 66 tourist resorts catering to wildlife tourism, especially in the areas of Masinagudi and Bokkapuram. Other important tourist villages are Chadpatti, Mavanhalla, Valaithottum and Singara. There are also many unauthorised small homestays operating. Tourist facilities in these six villages cover 791 acres (3.2 km^{2}). Half of the facilities charge less than Rs 500 per night. In 2008, close to 73,000 people stayed at the tourist resorts on the Sigur Plateau with around 58% of these tourists coming just to see the wildlife. Of the 55 tourist facilities on the plateau only two had legally run bars, however, most of the facilities do serve alcohol to their guests. 69% of private facilities have a boundary connection to government revenue land or reserve forest and 91% are fenced, usually with electrified fence. There are 11 government tourist facilities within Mudumalai Wildlife Sanctuary or within reserve forest or revenue land and none of them are fenced.
