= Moyar River =

River in India

Coordinates: 11°34′N 76°56′E

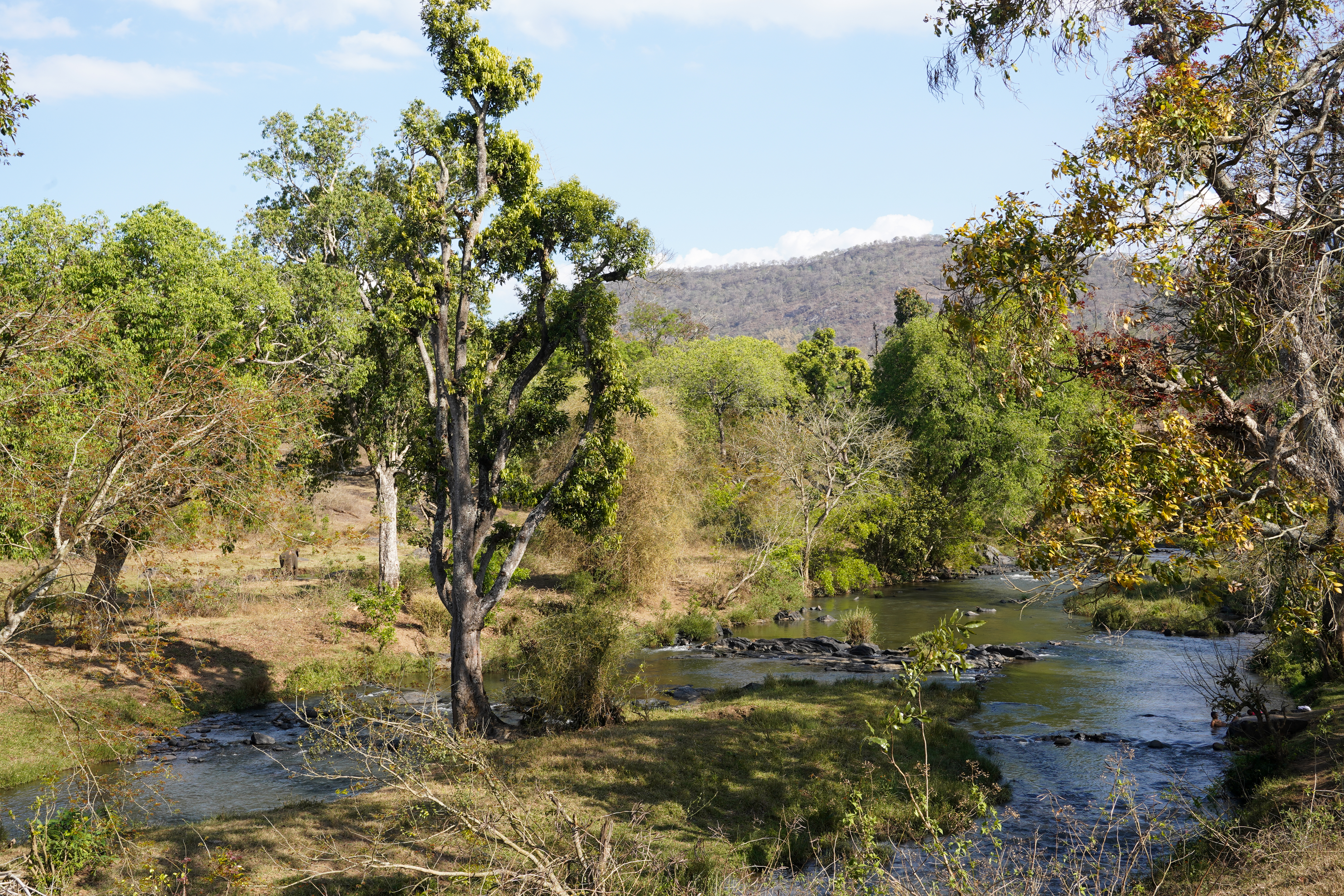
Mayar River at Theppakadu, Mudumalai National Park

The Moyar falls

The Moyar River (also Mayar) is one of the tributaries of the Bhavani, which itself is a tributary of the Kaveri in Tamil Nadu, South India.

The Moyar river originates from a small town called Mayar off the Masinagudi–Ooty road. This is a natural line of separation between the state of Karnataka and Tamil Nadu and a separation between the forest of Bandipur National Park and the Mudumalai sanctuary to the south. The Moyar meets the Bhavani River at the Bhavanisagar reservoir on the plains of Tamil Nadu near Satyamangalam.

== Mysore Ditch ==
The Moyar River Gorge also known as Mysore Ditch is 20 km (12 mi) long. The river flows into the gorge below Theppakadu in a roaring waterfall called Moyar Falls. There is a point in gorge where Sigurhalla river from Sigur Plateau joins it after forming a 3 kms long gorge.

== See also ==
- The Elephant Whisperers
