= Mudumalai National Park =

National park in Tamil Nadu, India

- Mudumalai Tiger Reserve
- IUCN category II (national park)
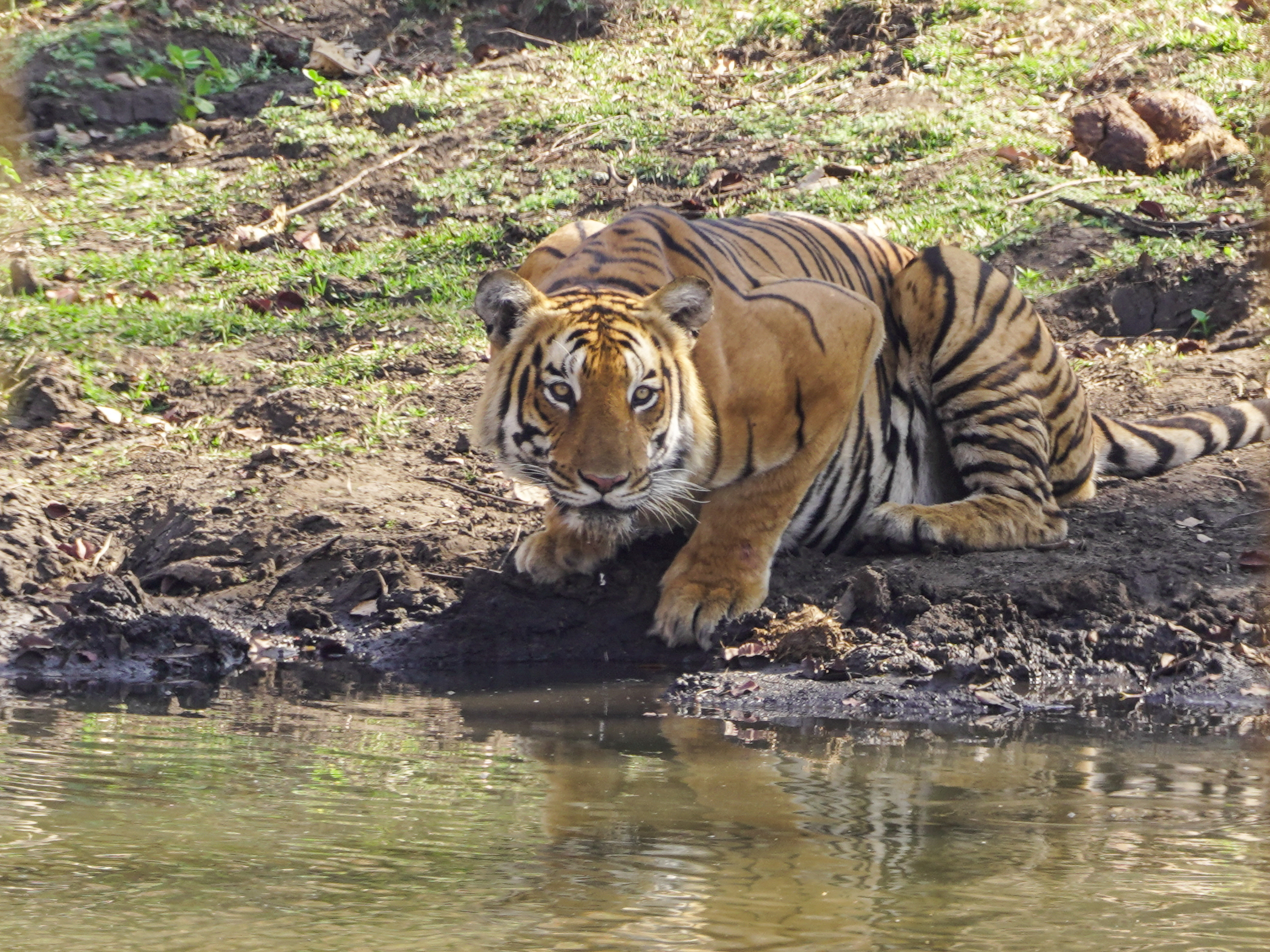
- Bengal tiger in Mudumalai National Park

- Location within Tamil Nadu Location within India
- Interactive map of Mudumalai National Park
- Location: Nilgiri District, Tamil Nadu, India
- Nearest city: Gudalur, Nilgiris
- Coordinates: 11.6°N 76.5°E
- Area: 321 km^{2} (124 sq mi)
- Elevation: 850–1,250 m (2,790–4,100 ft)
- Established: 1940
- Governing body: Tamil Nadu Forest Department
- Website: https://www.forests.tn.gov.in/

Mudumalai National Park is a national park in the Nilgiri Mountains in Tamil Nadu in southern India. It covers 321 km^{2} (124 sq mi) at an elevation range of 850–1,250 m (2,790–4,100 ft) in the Nilgiri District and shares boundaries with the states of Karnataka and Kerala. A part of this area has been protected since 1940. The national park has been part of Nilgiri Biosphere Reserve since 1986 and was declared a tiger reserve together with a buffer zone of 367.59 km^{2} (141.93 sq mi) in 2007. It receives an annual rainfall of about 1,420 mm (56 in) and harbours tropical and subtropical moist broadleaf forests with 498 plant species, at least 266 bird species, 18 carnivore and 10 herbivore species. It is drained by the Moyar River and several tributaries, which harbour 38 fish species.

Traffic on three public roads passing through the national park has caused significant roadkills of mammals, reptiles and amphibians. The park's northern part has been affected by several wildfires since 1999.

== History ==
The word Mudumalai is a Tamil word, with முது 'mutu' meaning old, ancient, original; and முதுகாடு 'mudhukadu' meaning ancient forest. The word மலை 'malai' means hill or mountain. The name 'Mudumalai forest' was already in use when the British Government rented the forest in 1857 for logging purposes from the Raja of Neelambur. In 1914, large forest tracts on the Sigur Plateau were declared as reserve forest for systematic logging. An area of about 60 km^{2} (23 sq mi) was established as Mudumalai Wildlife Sanctuary in 1940. The sanctuary was enlarged in 1977 and incorporated into Nilgiri Biosphere Reserve in 1986. It was declared as a Tiger Reserve under Project Tiger in April 2007 and notified as 'Critical Tiger Habitat' in December 2007. At the time, 1,947 people lived in 28 hamlets inside the reserve; they kept about 1,060 cattle. In 2010, it was proposed to resettle them. This notification was criticised by activists and conservationists as having been intransparent and undemocratic.

In 2010, the National Tiger Conservation Authority approved the release of funds to Mudumalai Tiger Reserve in the frame of Project Tiger. In 2020, Project Tiger has been extended until 2021 with funding of ₹ 114.1 million borne by the Government of India and the Government of Tamil Nadu.

== Geography ==
Mudumalai National Park and vicinity

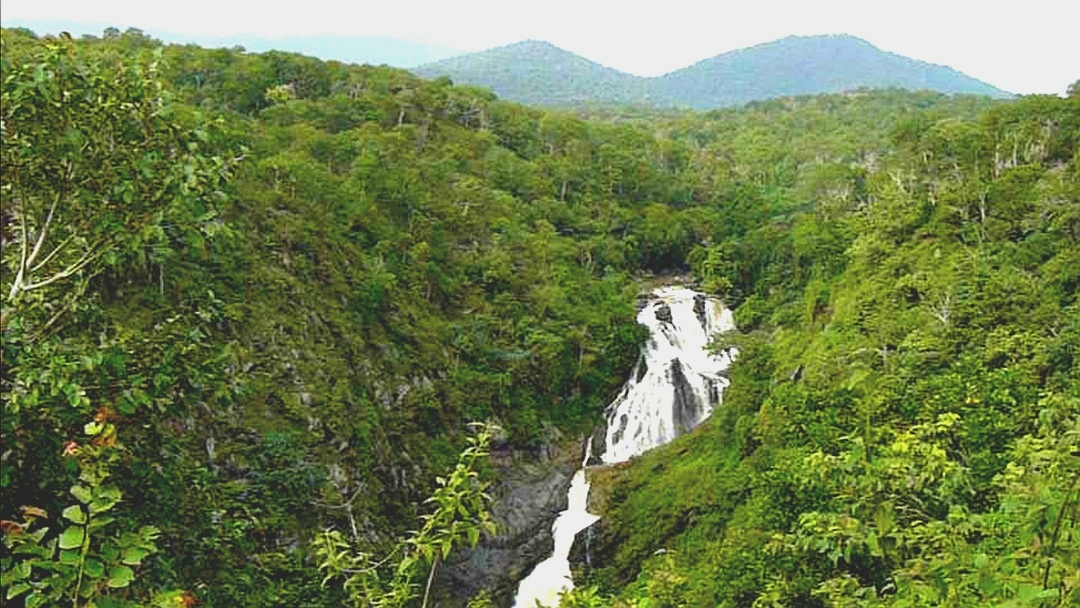
Moyar River waterfall

Mudumalai National Park covers 321 km^{2} (124 sq mi) in the eastern hills of the Western Ghats at an elevation range of 850–1,250 m (2,790–4,100 ft); it is bordered in the west by Wayanad Wildlife Sanctuary, in the north by Bandipur National Park, and in the east by Sigur Reserve Forest. In the south, it is bordered by Singara Reserve Forest. The Moyar River enters the national park in the south and is joined by five tributaries. Together, they drain this area, and several artificial waterholes provide drinking water for wildlife during dry seasons. The original national park area together with a surrounding buffer zone of 367.59 km^{2} (141.93 sq mi) was designated as Mudumalai Tiger Reserve.

The elevation range of 250–1,200 m (820–3,940 ft) in the Western Ghats is characterised by evergreen forest with dipterocarp species prevailing. Its undulating hills consist mostly of hornblendite and biotite gneiss with black sandy loam; red heavy loam prevails in the southern part. It is part of the ecoregion South Western Ghats moist deciduous forests. Mudumalai National Park and the adjacent Sigur Reserve Forest form an important wildlife corridor within the Nilgiri Biosphere Reserve and provide the highest landscape connectivity for the Asian elephant (Elephas maximus) population in the region.

=== Climate ===
Mudumalai National Park receives about 1,420 mm (56 in) rainfall annually, most of it during the southwest monsoon season from June to September. The temperature drops during the cool season from December to January, but rises during April to June, which are the hottest months. Annual precipitation ranges from 1,100 mm (43 in) in the south and west to 600 mm (24 in) in the east.

== Flora ==
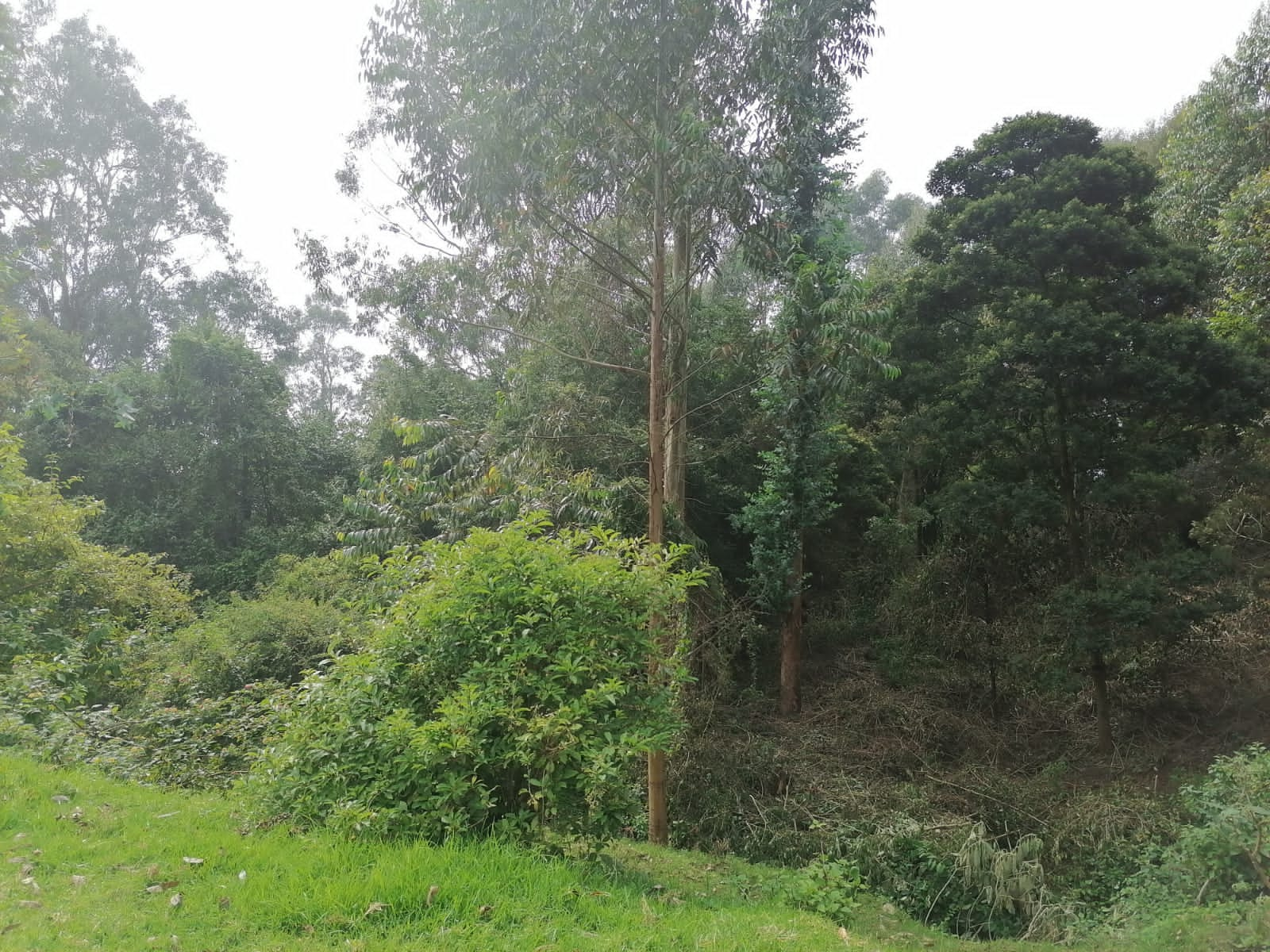
Forest in Mudumalai National Park

Mudumalai National Park harbours tropical and subtropical moist broadleaf forests. The floral diversity comprises 498 plant species including 154 tree, 77 shrub, 214 herb and 53 vine species. Teak (Tectona grandis) and axlewood (Anogeissus latifolia) are the dominant tree species with a density of more than 105 trees/ha (42 trees/acre). Prominent tree species include flame-of-the-forest (Butea monosperma), Indian laurel (Terminalia elliptica), kusum tree (Schleichera oleosa), weaver's beam tree (Schrebera swietenioides), Malabar kino tree (Pterocarpus marsupium), Indian rosewood (Dalbergia latifolia), Malabar plum (Syzygium cumini), silk-cotton tree (Bombax ceiba) and Indian beech (Millettia pinnata); moist deciduous forest is interspersed with giant thorny bamboo (Bambusa bambos). Mangifera indica and persimmon (Diospyros) grow along river courses. Climbers include orange climber (Zanthoxylum asiaticum), Wattakaka volubilis, frangipani vine (Chonemorpha fragrans), trellis-vine (Pergularia daemia), purple morning glory (Argyreia cuneata), striped cucumber (Diplocyclos palmatus) and several jasmine species. Ceylon satinwood (Chloroxylon swietenia), red cedar (Erythroxylum monogynum) and catechu (Senegalia catechu) are the dominant plants in shrubland patches.

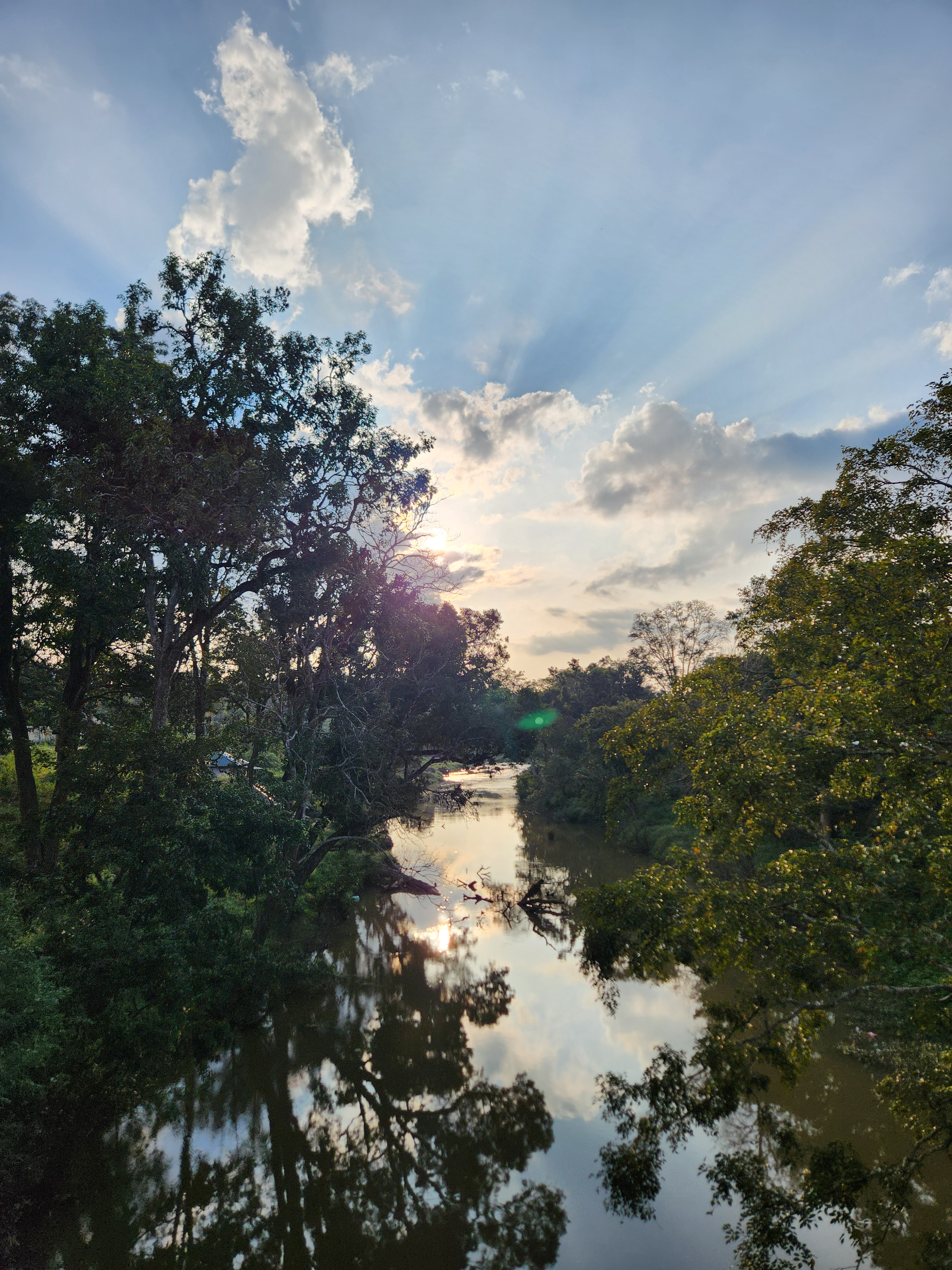
Forest area near Moyar River

Lantana camara is an invasive species that negatively affects the dispersal of the native Indian gooseberry (Phyllanthus emblica) and Kydia calycina, but does not affect growth and dispersal of other shrubs. A study on nesting behaviour of birds revealed that red-vented bulbul (Pycnonotus cafer) and red-whiskered bulbul (P. jocosus) prefer its top canopy level for building nests in spring.

An exceptionally large arjun tree (Terminalia arjuna) with a height of 32 m (105 ft) and a girth of 8.45 m (27.7 ft) was detected in the Moyar River valley in 2019; it was used by white-rumped vulture (Gyps bengalensis), brown fish owl (Ketupa zeylonensis), spot-bellied eagle-owl (Bubo nipalensis), crested honey buzzard (Pernis ptilorhynchus), changeable hawk-eagle (Nisaetus cirrhatus) and shikra (Accipiter badius) for roosting.

== Fauna ==
During the major flowering season, 394 nests of the giant honey bee (Apis dorsata) were detected in the park between January and June 2007; bee colonies comprised an average of 19 nests, mostly built in large trees.

=== Mammals ===
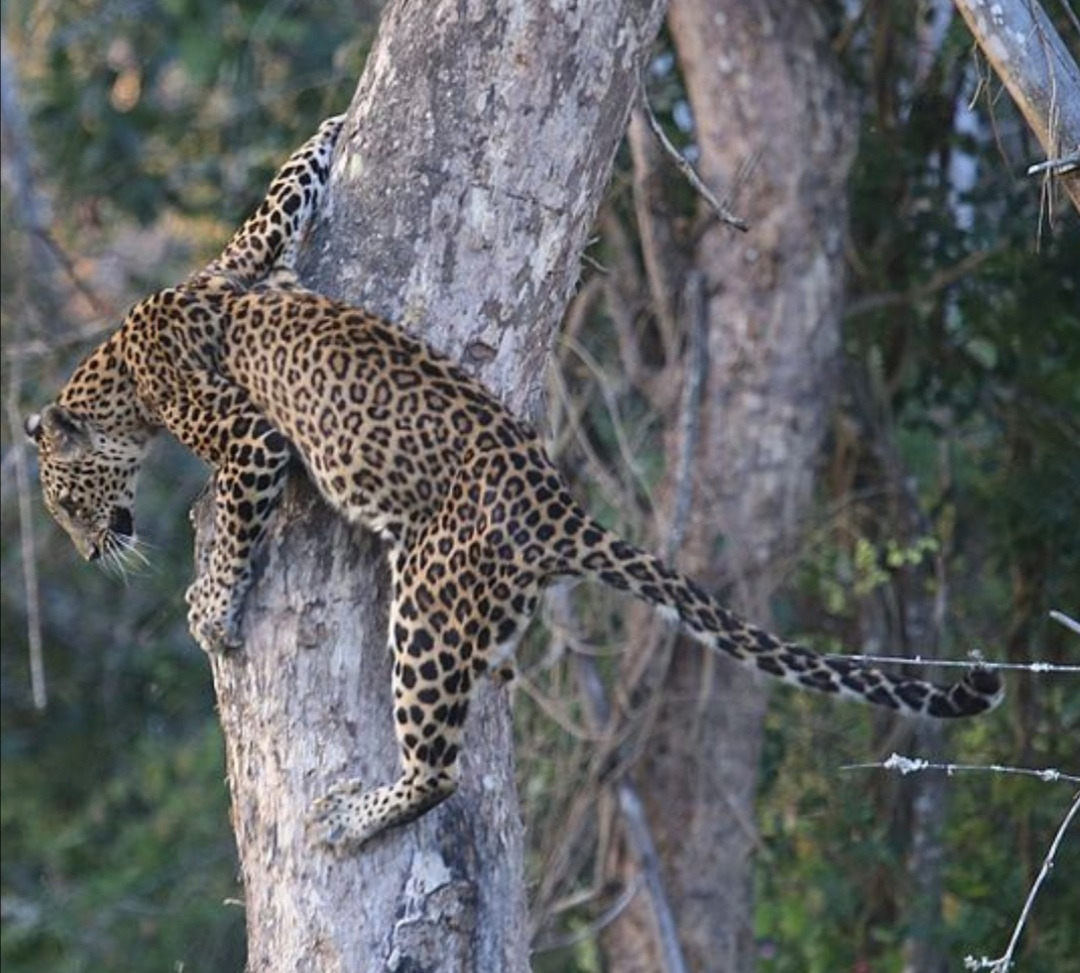
Leopard in Masinagudi

A survey carried out between November 2008 and February 2009 revealed that about 29 Indian leopards (Panthera pardus fusca) and 19 Bengal tigers (P. tigris tigris) lived in the park's core area of 107 km^{2} (41 sq mi). As of 2018, the tiger population in the wider Mudumalai Tiger Reserve was estimated to comprise 103 resident individuals. Jungle cat (Felis chaus), rusty-spotted cat (Prionailurus rubiginosus) and leopard cat (P. bengalensis) were recorded during camera trap surveys in 2010–2011 and 2018. Two dhole (Cuon alpinus) packs were monitored during 1989–1993 and had home ranges of 83.3 and 54.2 km^{2} (32.2 and 20.9 sq mi); packs comprised between four and 25 individuals during this period. Golden jackal (Canis aureus), and Nilgiri marten (Martes gwatkinsii) were also recorded in 2018.

Scat of sloth bear (Melursus ursinus) collected along forest roads and animal trails contained remains of 18 plant species with golden shower (Cassia fistula), Indian plum (Zizyphus mauritiana) and clammy cherry (Cordia obliqua) forming the bulk of its diet apart from fungus-growing termites (Odontotermes), fire ants and honey bees. Small Indian civet (Viverricula indica), Asian palm civet (Paradoxurus hermaphroditus) and brown palm civet (P. jerdoni) live in both deciduous and semi-evergreen forest patches; ruddy mongoose (Urva smithii) lives foremost in deciduous forest, whereas stripe-necked mongoose (U. vitticollis) frequents riverine areas, and Indian grey mongoose U. edwardsii open habitats. The mongooses forage foremost for pill millipedes, dung beetles, fruits, small rodents, birds and reptiles. Smooth-coated otter (Lutrogale perspicillata) groups were observed along the Moyar River in 2010 and 2011. Their habitat preference was studied between 2015 and 2017; the groups preferred rocky areas near fast flowing water with loose sand and little vegetation cover.

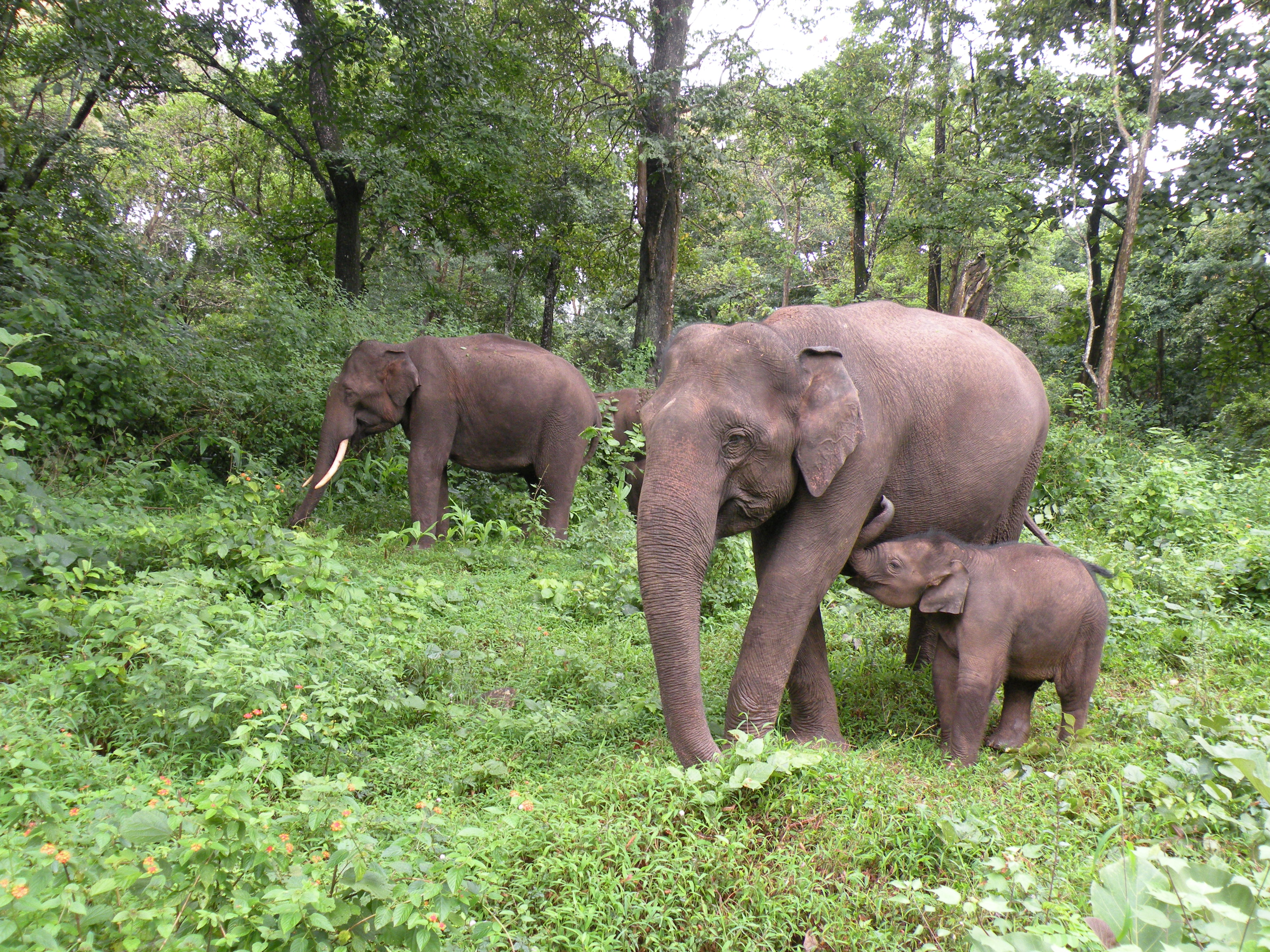
Asian elephant family

The Asian elephant is the largest mammal in the park with an estimated 536–1,001 individuals in 25 herds in 2000. Herds comprise up to 22 individuals. The gaur (Bos gaurus) is the largest ungulate in the park, with herds of up to 42 individuals that frequent foremost grasslands in the vicinity of water sources. The sambar deer (Cervus unicolor) forms smaller groups of up to five individuals, but also congregates in groups of up to 45 individuals in the wet season. The chital (Axis axis) forms large groups of at least 35 individuals, with some herds increasing to more than 100 members in the wet season. Chital, Indian spotted chevrotain (Moschiola indica) and Indian muntjac (Muntiacus muntjak) have been recorded eating fallen fruit of the Indian gooseberry in a forest monitoring plot; they are therefore considered to be the primary seed dispersers in the park. Present are also four-horned antelope (Tetracerus quadricornis), blackbuck (Antilope cervicapra), wild boar (Sus scrofa), Indian pangolin (Manis crassicaudata) and Indian crested porcupine (Hystrix indica).

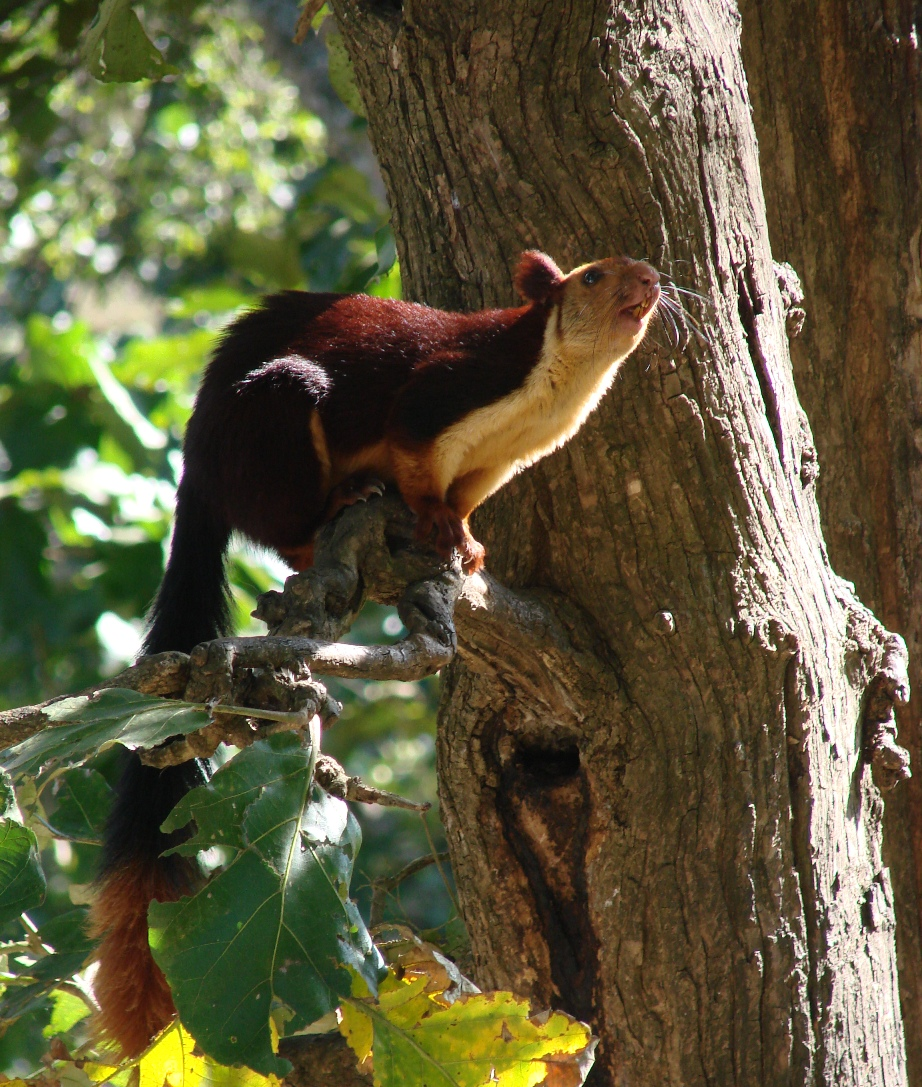
Indian giant squirrel

Four bonnet macaque (Macaca radiata) troops were studied in 1997, which ranged in size from 28 to 35 members and lived in sympatry with gray langur (Semnopithecus entellus) troops. A troop in the Moyar River valley foraged on leaves, flowers and fruits of several tree and shrub species including tamarind (Tamarindus indica), banyan fig (Ficus benghalensis), wild jujube (Ziziphus oenoplia), neem (Azadirachta indica), kaayam (Memecylon edule) and indigoberry (Randia malabarica), but also consumed herbs, crickets and grasshoppers. The range of the Indian giant squirrel (Ratufa indica) is continuous in the national park's moist deciduous forest; in the drier eastern part, it inhabits foremost riverine habitat with contiguous canopy. It builds nests in trees with a mean canopy height of 10.6 m (35 ft) and feeds on 25 plant species including teak, Indian laurel and Grewia tiliifolia. The Indian giant flying squirrel (Petaurista philippensis) inhabits foremost moist deciduous forest with old trees of a mean 12.9 m (42 ft) height, a mean density of 499 trees/ha (202 trees/acre) and a canopy height of at least 6.86 m (22.5 ft).

In 2013, a painted bat (Kerivoula picta) was sighted in the eastern part of the tiger reserve.

=== Birds ===
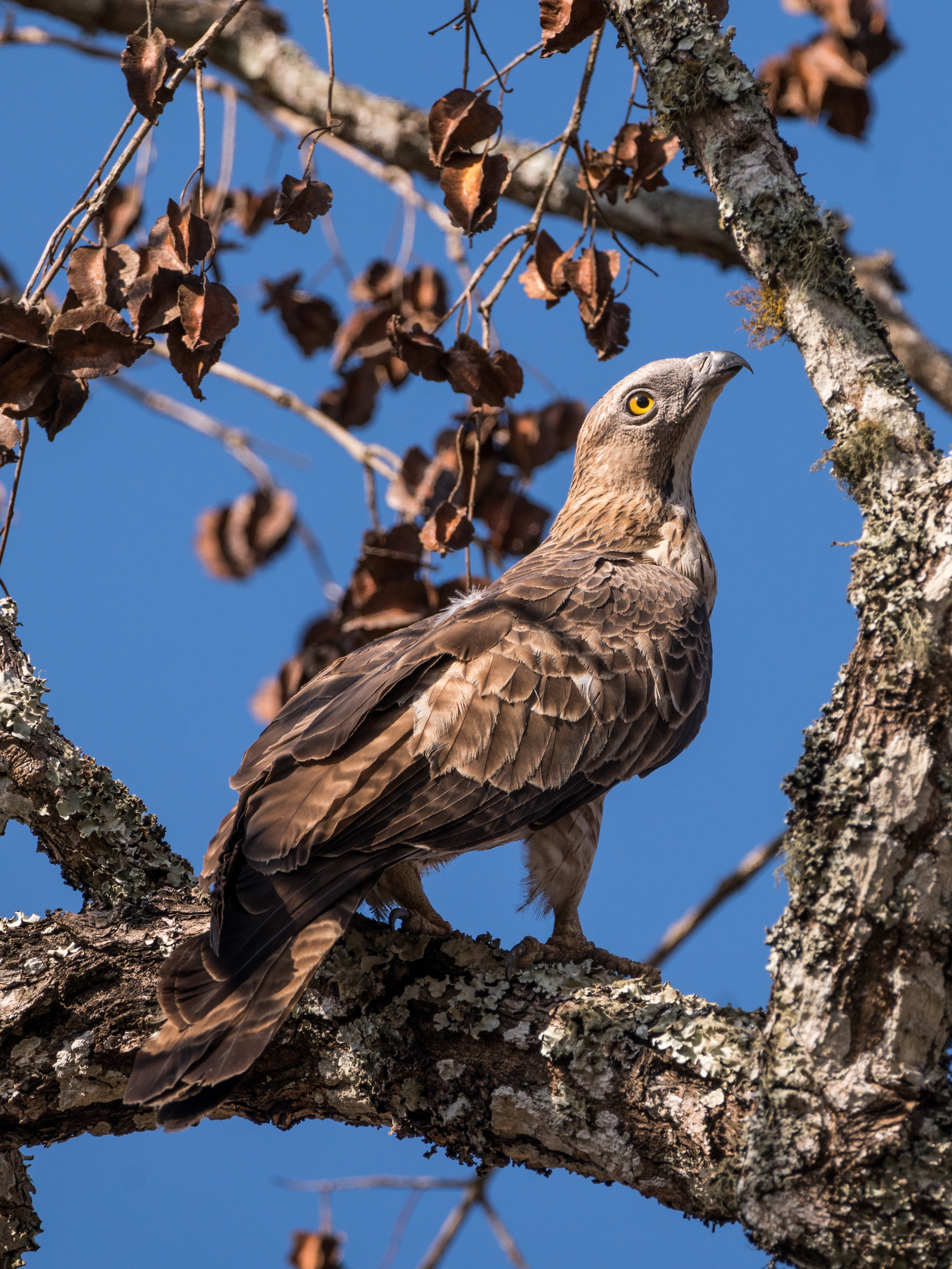
Crested honey buzzard

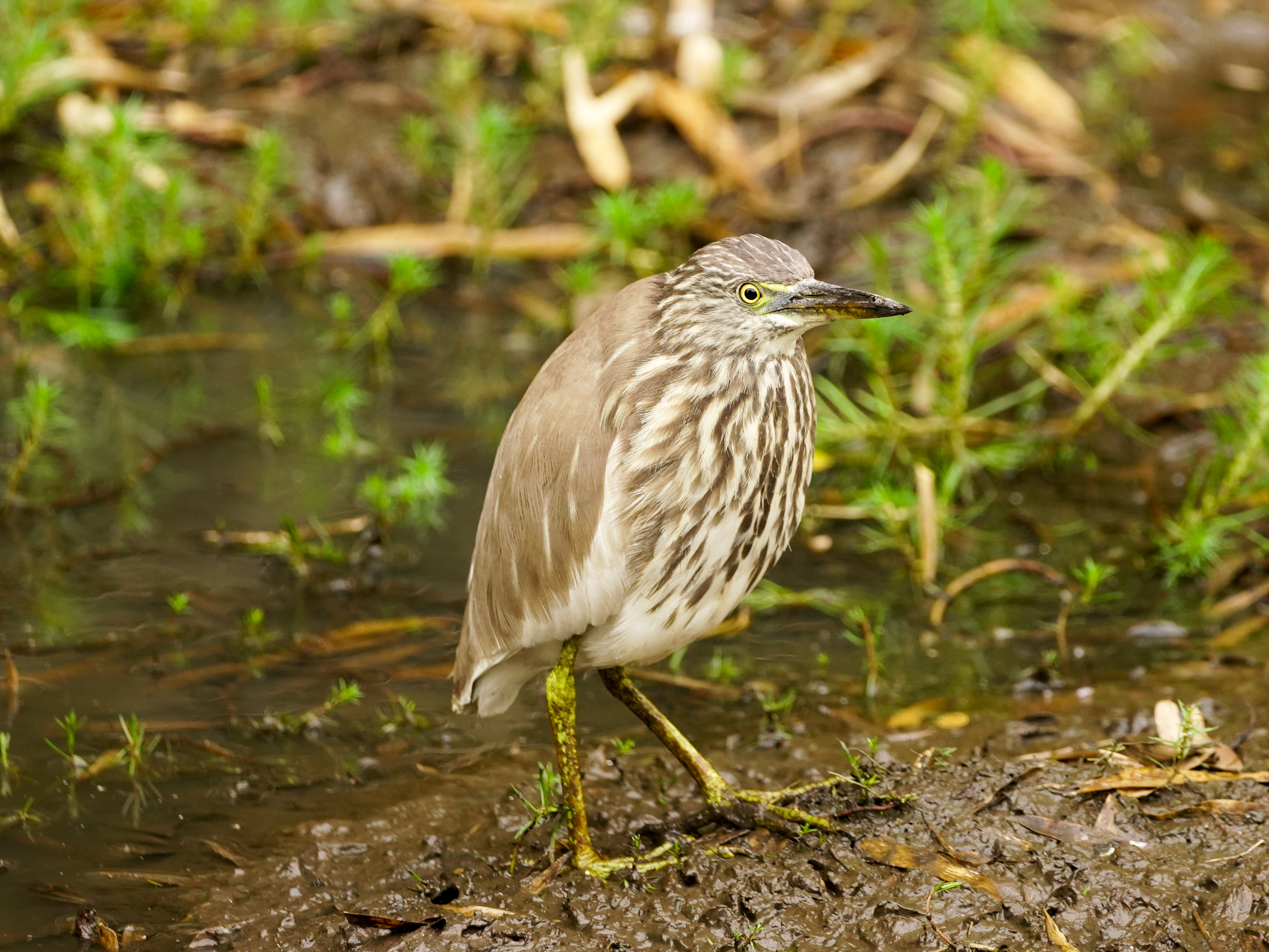
Indian pond heron in the buffer zone

Birds observed from 1994 to 1996 comprised 266 species; the 213 resident ones include Malabar grey hornbill (Ocyceros griseus), Indian grey hornbill (O. birostris), Indian peafowl (Pavo cristatus), Bonelli's eagle (Aquila fasciata), crested serpent eagle (Spilornis cheela), black eagle (Ictinaetus malaiensis), besra (Accipiter virgatus) and crested goshawk (A. trivirgatus), white-rumped shama (Copsychus malabaricus), Indian roller (Coracias benghalensis), greater flameback (Chrysocolaptes guttacristatus) and white-naped woodpecker (C. festivus), black-rumped flameback (Dinopium benghalense), white-bellied woodpecker (Dryocopus javensis), heart-spotted woodpecker (Hemicircus canente), rufous woodpecker (Micropternus brachyurus), greater racket-tailed drongo (Dicrurus paradiseus), grey-bellied cuckoo (Cacomantis passerinus) and Indian cuckoo (Cuculus micropterus), coppersmith barbet (Psilopogon haemacephalus), white-cheeked barbet (P. viridis) and brown-headed barbet (P. zeylanicus), grey francolin (Ortygornis pondicerianus), speckled piculet (Picumnus innominatus), Indian pond heron (Ardeola grayii), white-throated kingfisher (Halcyon smyrnensis), blue-winged parakeet (Psittacula columboides), Nilgiri wood pigeon (Columba elphinstonii), common emerald dove (Chalcophaps indica), yellow-footed pigeon (Treron phoenicoptera), red spurfowl (Galloperdix spadicea) and grey junglefowl (Gallus sonneratii), painted bush quail (Perdicula erythrorhyncha), crimson-backed sunbird (Leptocoma minima), Loten's sunbird (Cinnyris lotenius), forest wagtail (Dendronanthus indicus), white-browed wagtail (Motacilla maderaspatensis) black-and-orange flycatcher (Ficedula nigrorufa), Eurasian golden oriole (Oriolus oriolus) and black-hooded oriole (O. xanthornus). In 2004, pin-striped tit-babblers (Mixornis gularis) were observed in a dry stream bed outside the protected area. December to March is the breeding season of yellow-crowned woodpecker (Leiopicus mahrattensis), streak-throated woodpecker (Picus xanthopygaeus), yellow-throated sparrow (Gymnoris xanthocollis), blue-bearded bee-eater (Nyctyornis atherton), Indian robin (Saxicoloides fulicatus), scaly-breasted munia (Lonchura punctulata) and white-rumped munia (L. striata).

Spot-bellied eagle-owl, Oriental scops owl (Otus sunia), brown boobook (Ninox scutulata) and jungle owlet (Glaucidium radiatum) are known night birds in the region. A juvenile cinereous vulture (Aegypius monachus) was recorded in spring 2019. The vulture populations in Moyar River valley were surveyed in March 2019. About 200 white-rumped vultures and about 30 active white-backed vulture (Gyps africanus) nests were observed; Indian vultures (G. indicus) and red-headed vultures (Sarcogyps calvus) were sighted at several locations.

Sightings of migrating birds include booted eagle (Hieraaetus pennatus), rufous-bellied eagle (Lophotriorchis kienerii), Eurasian sparrowhawk (Accipiter nisus), common buzzard (Buteo buteo), western marsh harrier (Circus aeruginosus) and pallid harrier (C. macrourus), cotton pygmy goose (Nettapus coromandelianus), knob-billed duck (Sarkidiornis melanotos), northern pintail (Anas acuta) and rosy starling (Pastor roseus). White storks (Ciconia ciconia) were observed in December 2013 and February 2014.

=== Reptiles ===
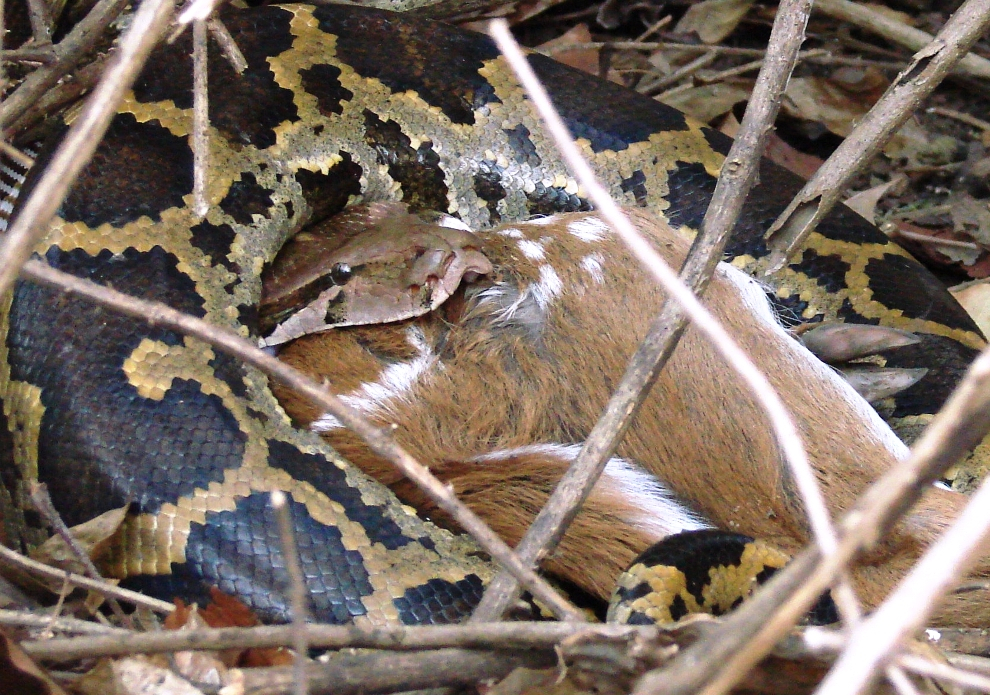
Indian rock python feeding on a chital in Moyar River valley

In 1992, six Indian star tortoises (Geochelone elegans) were sighted in scrubland at elevations of 850–950 m (2,790–3,120 ft). An ornate flying snake (Chrysopelea ornata) was observed in 2006. The mugger crocodile (Crocodylus palustris) population in Moyar River was thought to encompass about 100 individuals as of 2009. Small reptiles recorded in Mudumalai National Park comprise striped coral snake (Calliophis nigrescens), Elliot's forest lizard (Monilesaurus ellioti), Jerdon's day gecko (Cnemaspis jerdonii), Goan day gecko (C. indraneildasii) and Beddome's ground skink (Kaestlea beddomii). A dead Bibron's coral snake (Calliophis bibroni) was discovered on the road in the Theppakadu area at an elevation of 894 m (2,933 ft) in August 2013, the first record since 1874. A Bengal monitor (Varanus bengalensis) was recorded in 2018. The Indian rock python (Python molurus) was studied in the frame of a telemetry project in the Moyar River valley from 2017 to 2020. In February 2019, a 3.7 m (12 ft) long female Indian rock python was observed mating with two smaller males measuring 1.98 and 2.22 m (6 ft 6 in and 7 ft 3 in).

=== Fish ===
The Moyar River and tributaries harbour 38 fish species, including Nilgiri mystus (Hemibagrus punctatus), Puntius mudumalaiensis, Puntius melanostigma, reba carp (Cirrhinus reba), common carp (Cyprinus carpio), Deccan mahseer (Tor khudree), Malabar baril (Barilius gatensis), mullya garra (Garra mullya), zig-zag eel (Mastacembelus armatus) and bullseye snakehead (Channa marulius).

== Threats ==
From 1979 to 2011, remains of 148 dead Asian elephants were found in the park; 50 individuals were killed by poachers. Traffic on three public roads cutting through Mudumalai National Park pose a significant threat to the park's wildlife; between December 1998 and March 1999 alone, 180 animals belonging to 40 species were killed by drivers. Between December 2006 and November 2007, 101 amphibians and 78 reptiles became roadkills on a 6 km (3.7 mi) stretch of the national highway passing through the park including Indirana frogs, Indian skipper frog (Euphlyctis cyanophlyctis), bronzed frog (Indosylvirana temporalis), pigmy wrinkled frog (Nyctibatrachus beddomii), Asian common toad (Duttaphrynus melanostictus), common green forest lizard (Calotes calotes), Blanford's rock agama (Psammophilus blanfordanus), Mysore day gecko (Cnemaspis mysoriensis), bronze grass skink (Eutropis macularia), green keelback (Rhabdophis plumbicolor), trinket snake (Coelognathus helena), Russell's viper (Daboia russelii), common krait (Bungarus caeruleus) and hump-nosed viper (Hypnale hypnale). Between January 2014 and December 2016, 497 Indian palm squirrels (Funambulus palmarum) were found killed in traffic collisions on a 40 km (25 mi) long stretch of a state highway passing through the park. A 0.913 m (2 ft 11.9 in) long roadkilled Bibron's coral snake was found in September 2016.

Proliferating tourism resorts and increasing demand for firewood at the national park's periphery are also considered threats to its ecosystem. In 1995, the annual firewood need was estimated at 376 kg (829 lb) per person living in the periphery of the national park.

Between 1999 and 2013, six forest fires affected dry deciduous forest patches ranging in size from 80 ha (200 acres) to 85 km^{2} (33 sq mi) in the northern part of the national park; the plant diversity in burned patches needs more than 15 years to recover.

== See also ==
- Wildlife of Tamil Nadu
- List of birds of Tamil Nadu
- List of endemic plants in the Nilgiri Biosphere Reserve
- 2019 Bandipur forest fires
