= Theppakadu =

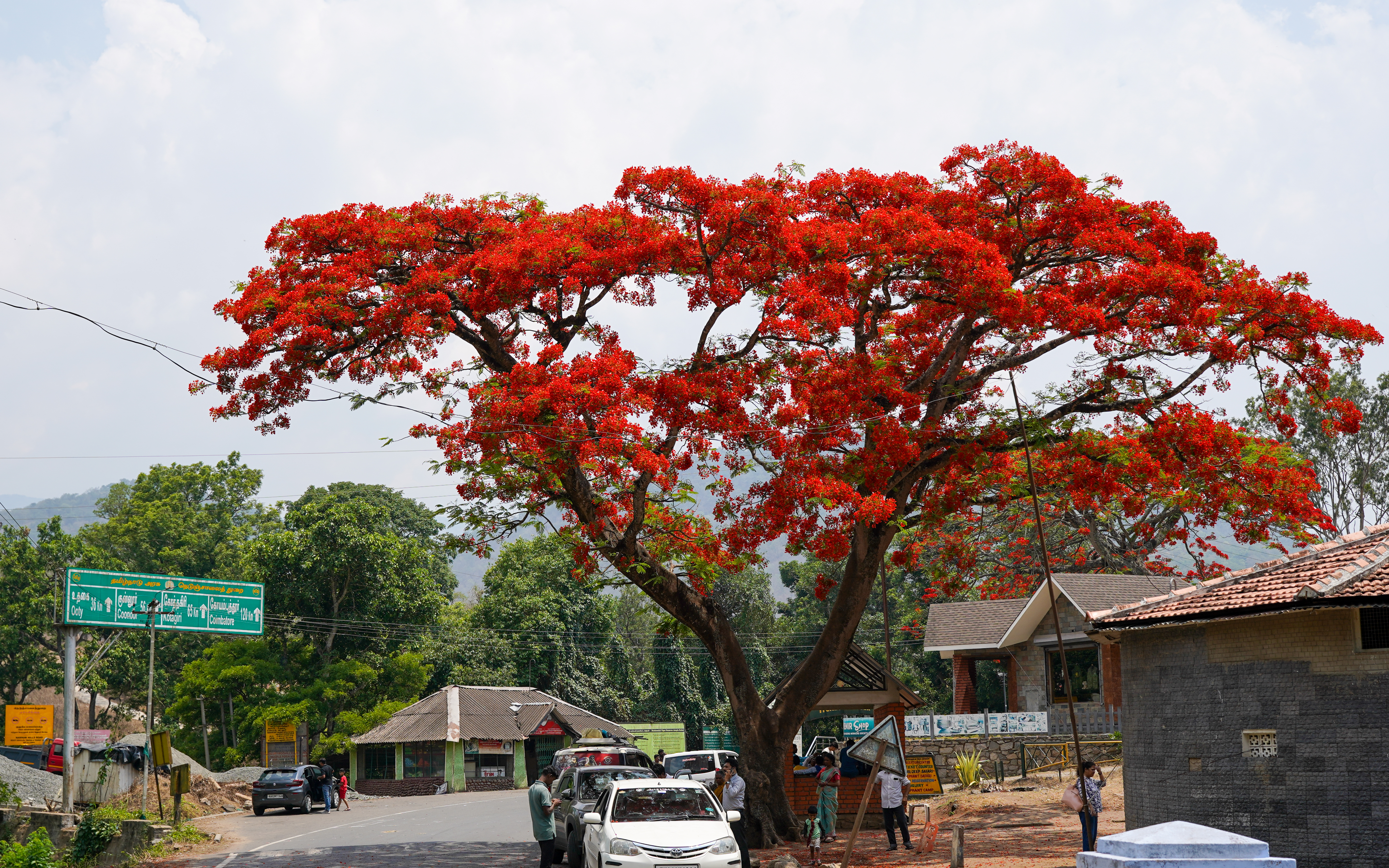
- Gulmohar at Theppakadu junction, April 2024

- Location in Tamil Nadu, India
- Coordinates: 11.5798917°N 76.5834792°E
- Country: India
- State: Tamil Nadu
- District: Nilgiris

Languages
  - Official: Tamil
- Time zone: UTC+5:30 (IST)
- Telephone code: 04262
- Vehicle registration: TN 43 Z

Theppakadu is a village in the Nilgiris district in the Indian state of Tamil Nadu. As per Census 2011, it is part of the Mudumalai village which covers 188.57 km^{2} (72.81 sq mi) and had a population of 1,694 persons in 2011. It has a reserve forest which is part of the Mudumalai National Park in western Tamil Nadu touching the south of Karnataka. Theppakadu is 240 km (150 mi) from Bangalore, via Mysore through SH17 and NH 212 (Ooty road).

== Elephant Camp ==
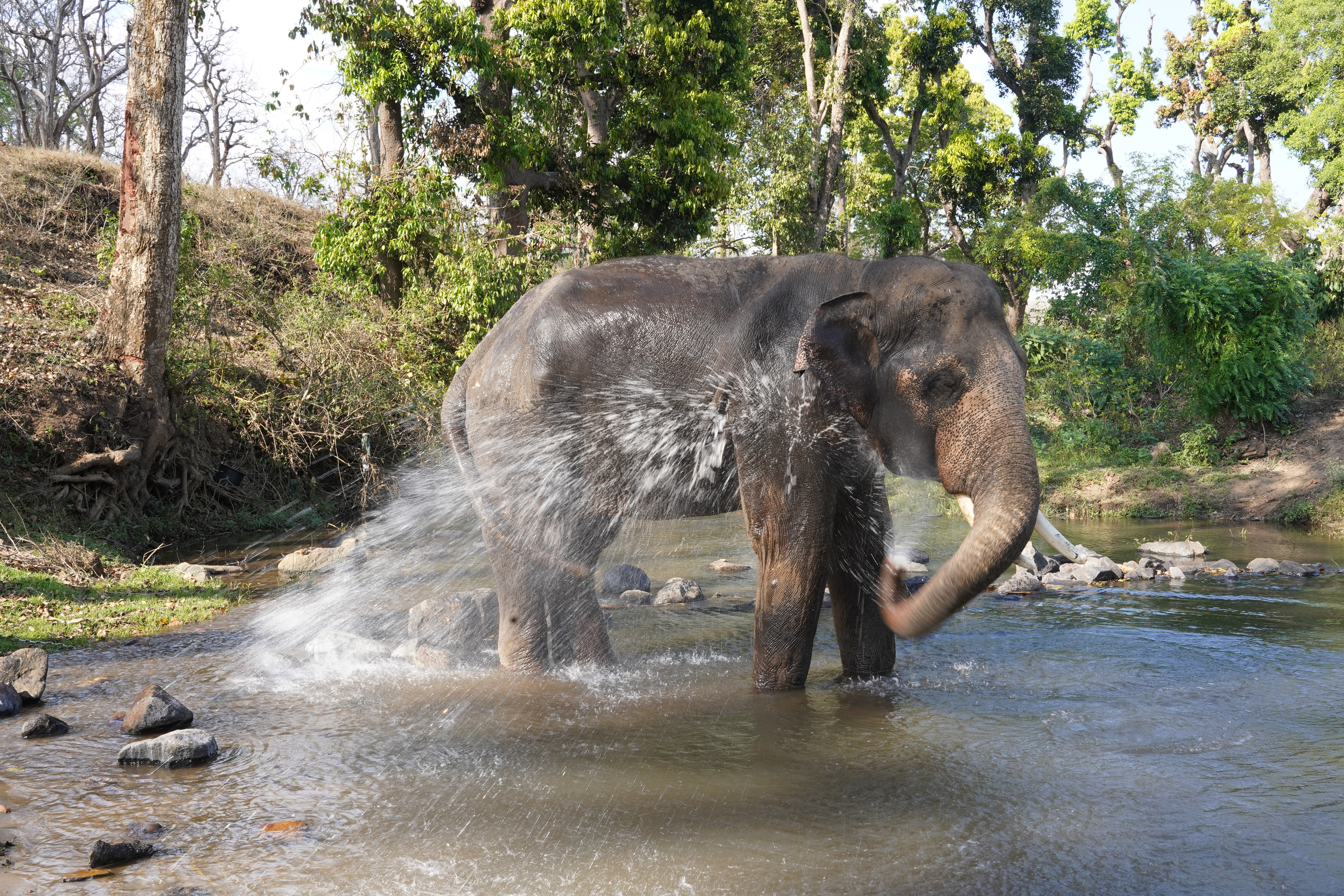
Camp elephant bathing in Moyar River, Theppakadu, Mar '21

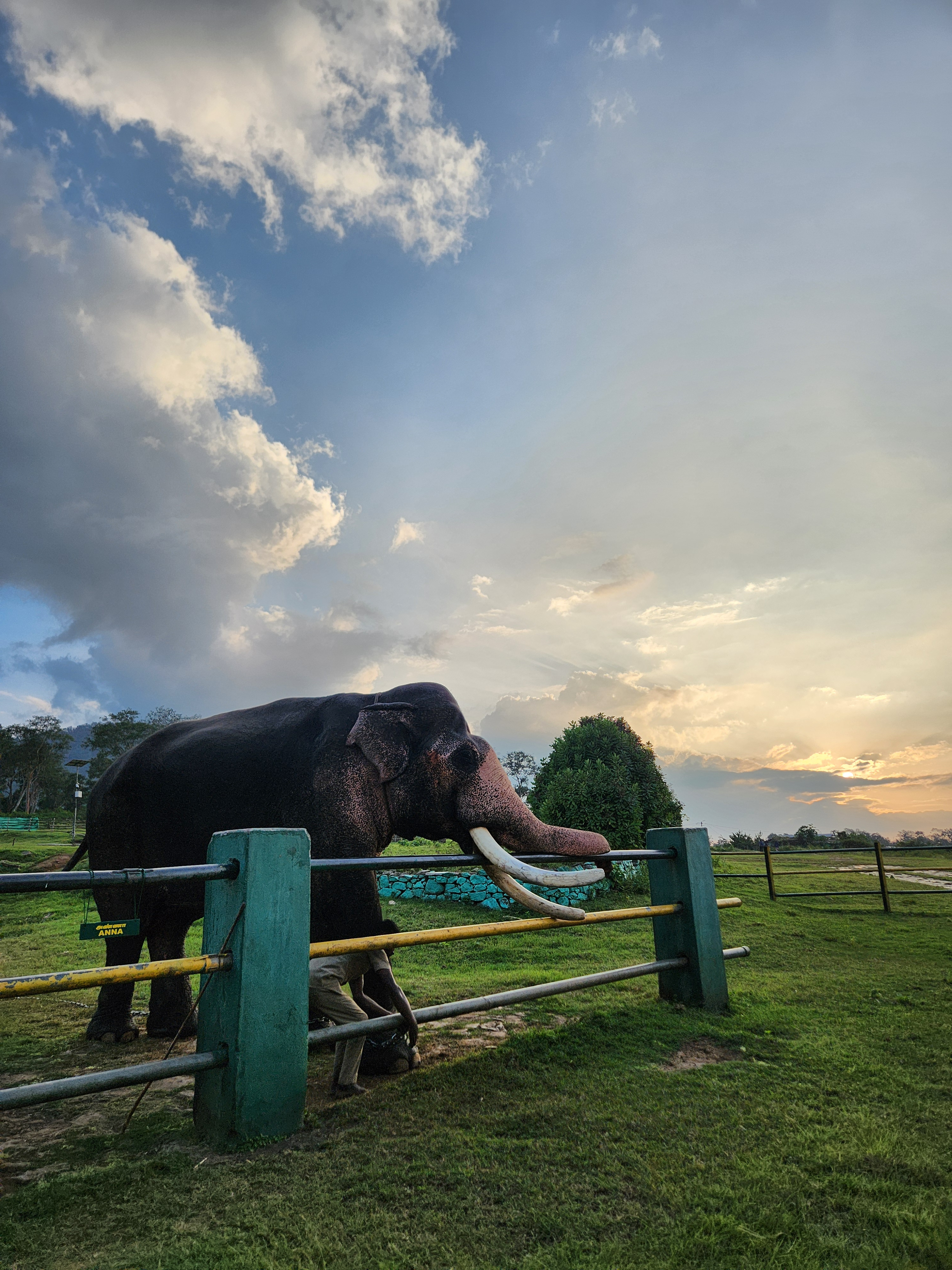
Elephant "Anna" resting in the camp during a feeding session (Dec 2024)

The Theppakadu Elephant Camp in the Mudumalai National Park is a tourist attraction. The camp was formed in 1910 for elephants used by timber traders. After the Government took over the forests, the working elephants or kumkis now do a variety of tasks. They are used to give rides to tourists and for patrolling during the monsoon.
