= Droog Fort, Coonoor =

Droog Fort
- Part of Tamil Nadu
- Nilgiris District, Tamil Nadu, India

Site information
- Type: Forts
- Condition: Ruins

Location
- Coordinates: 11.35°N 76.82°E

Site history
- Built: 18th century

Droog Fort (also called bakasura malai fort) is a historic fort located 15 kilometres (9.3 mi) from Coonoor, The Nilgiris, Tamil Nadu. The fort was used as an outpost by Tipu Sultan in the 18th century. Today, the fort is in ruins, with only one wall remaining. The site attracts tourists, who reach the fort by hiking through the Nonsuch Tea Estate.

In 2023 Tamil Nadu Tourism Development Corporation announced plans to construct a viewing point, food court, and toilets near the ruins.

== See also ==
- Coonoor
- Nilgiri mountains
- Catherine Falls
- Lamb's Rock
- Sim's Park
- Law's Falls
- Dolphin's Nose
- Katary Falls
- Lady Canning's Seat
