= Sim's Park, Coonoor =

Botanical garden in Tamil Nadu, India

Coordinates: 11°21′19.3″N 76°48′02.0″E

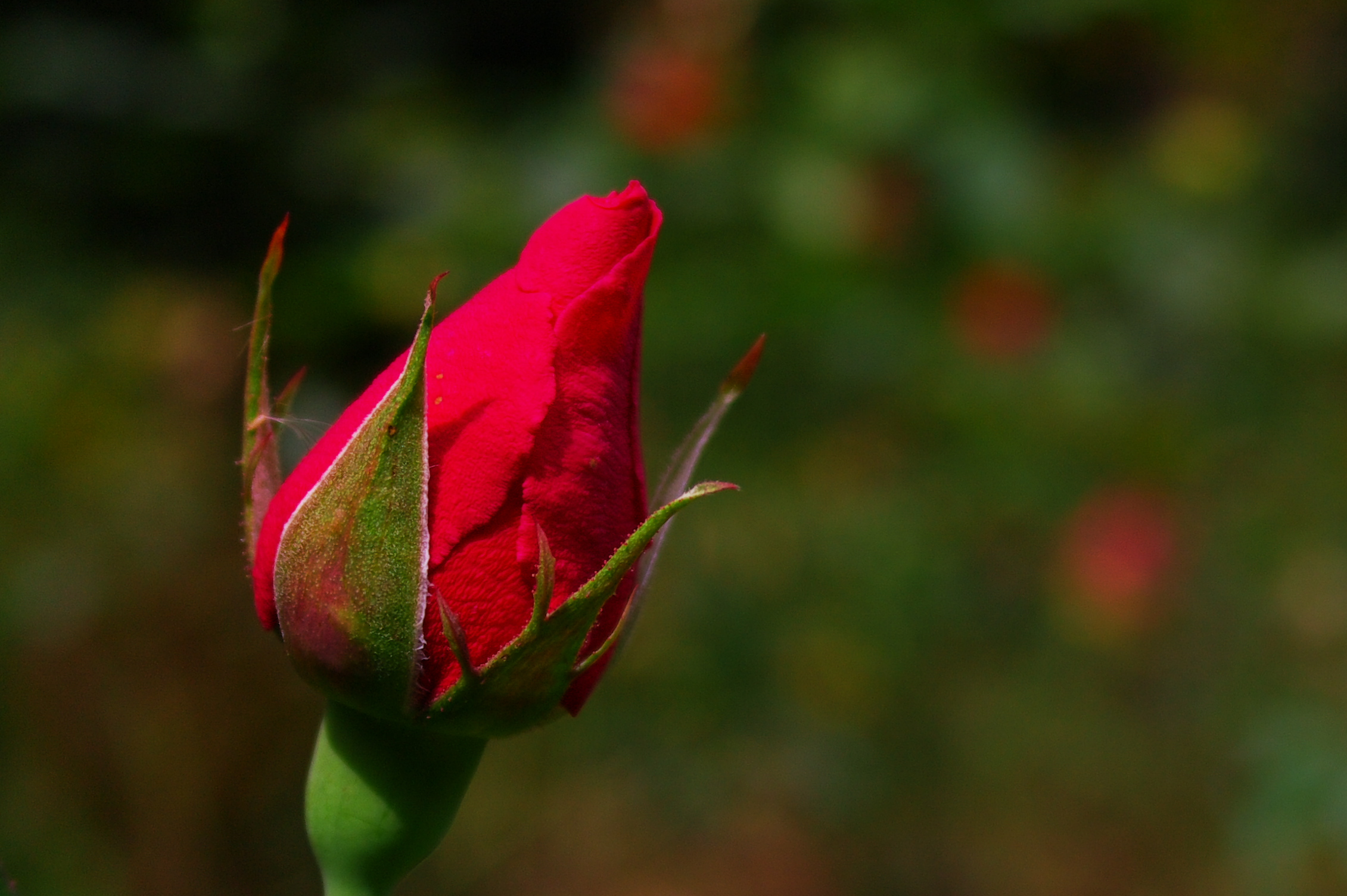
Rose bud

Sim's Park is in Coonoor, The Nilgiris, Tamil Nadu. It is an important tourist place to visit in Coonoor, at a height of 1780 meters above mean sea level. Here the maximum temperature goes up to 28 degree Celsius and the minimum falls to 5 °C. The average rain fall of this garden is 150 cm. It extends over an area of 12 hectares of undulating land and possesses a number of natural advantages.

== Establishment ==
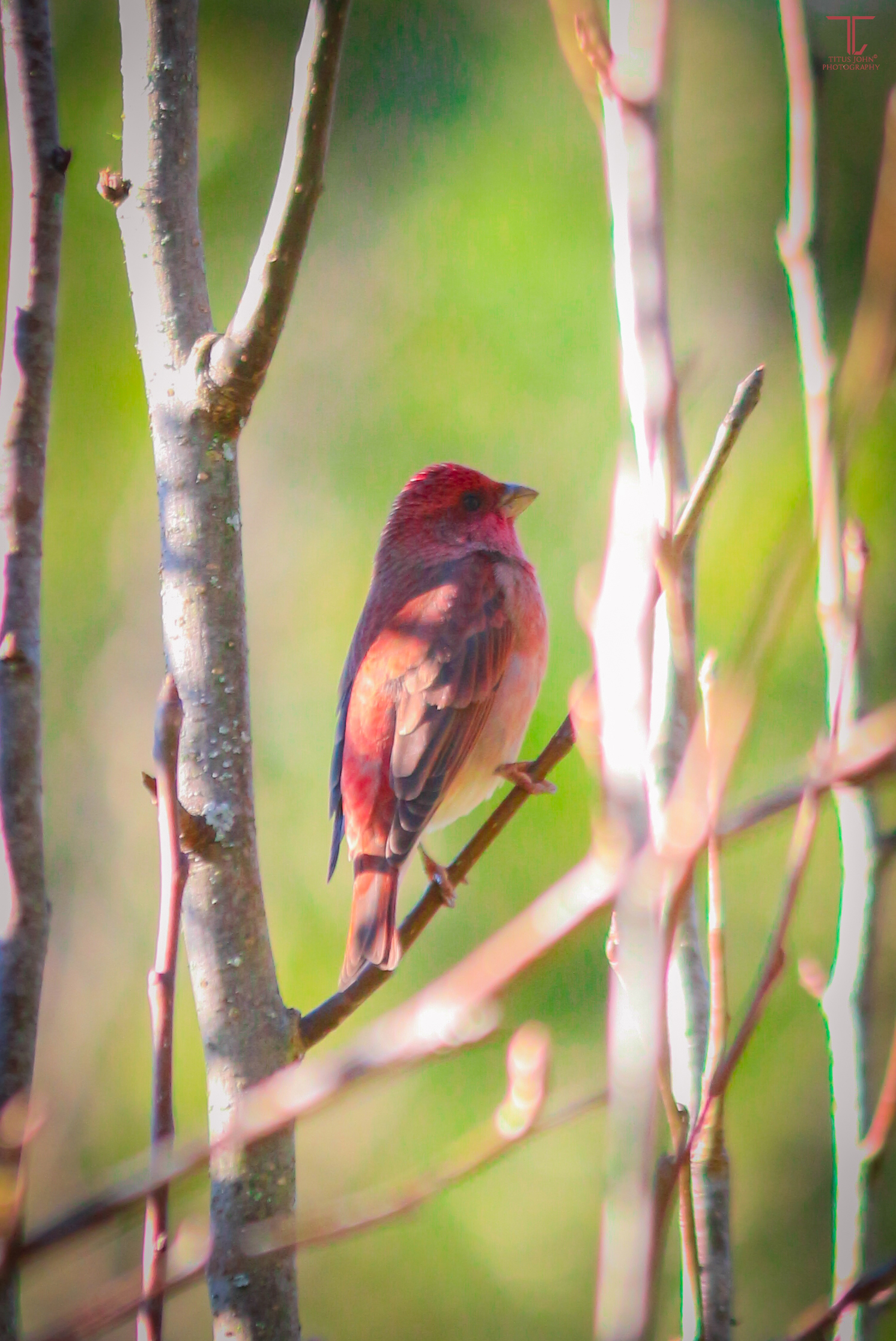
A Common Rosefinch (Male) In Sim's Park, Coonoor

This is an unusual park-cum-botanical garden that was developed around the natural contours of the land more than a hundred years ago by Mr. J.D. Sims and Major Murray in the year of 1874. Naturally occurring trees, shrubs and creepers are in the park as are many unusual species of plants that have been brought in from a variety of places around the world. The main event in this park is an annual fruit show and vegetable show held in May.

== Collections ==
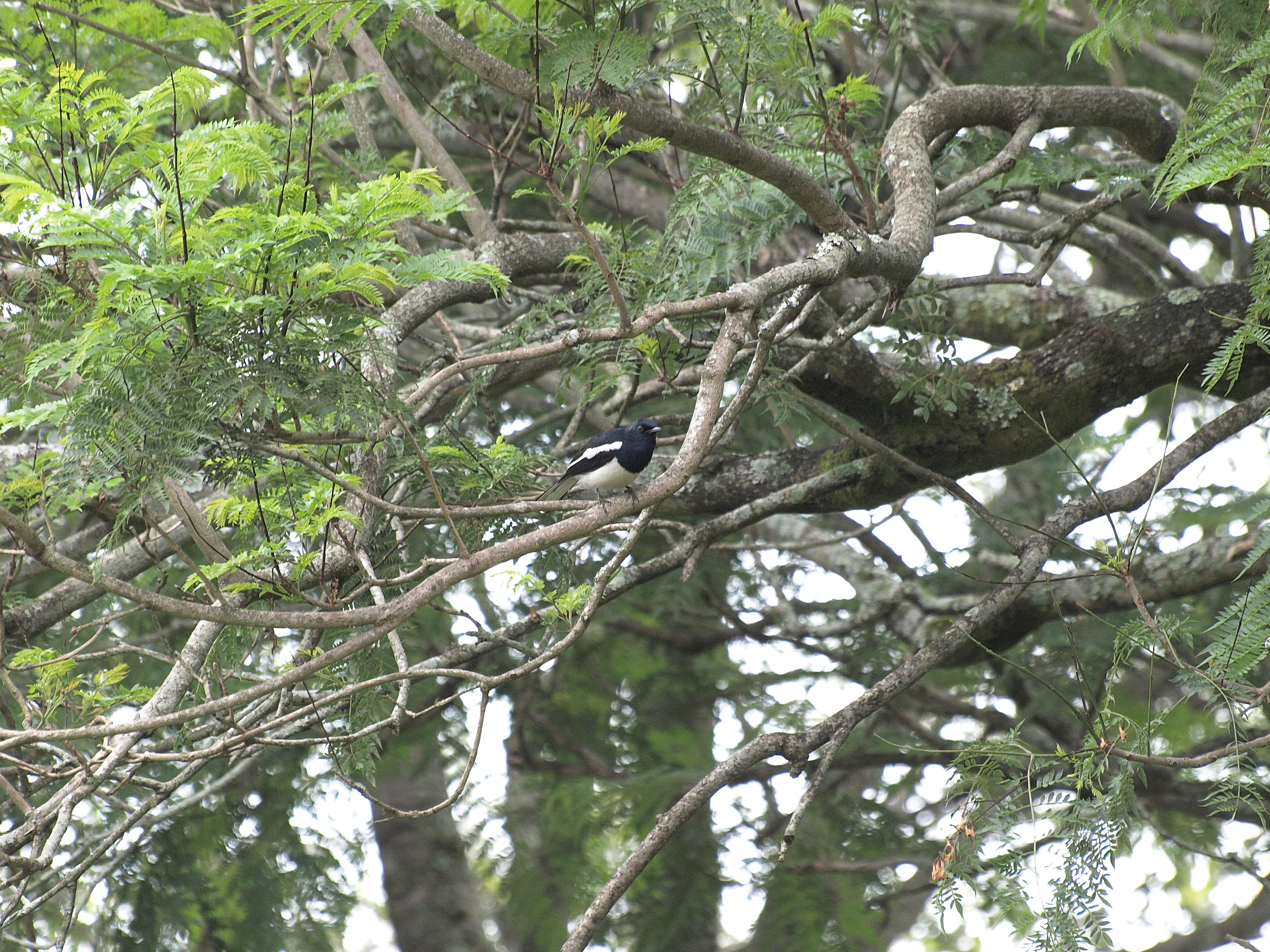
tree and a bird

This is a natural garden. Inside the park are terraces with colorful flower beds, lawns and rockeries. Some trees, shrubs, creepers and many unusual species of plants naturally occur; others were brought from a variety of places around the world. The garden as some rare economic trees like Rudraksh- bead tree, Cinnamomum, Queensland karri pine, a handsome ornamental tree and graceful trees like Araucaria, Quercus, Phoenix, Magnolia, Pine, Turpentine, Tree ferns, Camellia this is all are as many attractions in this park. There is a glass house housing different ornamental plants and flowers. On the other side of the park rose garden are maintained. This park has more than 1000 species of 255 genera belonging to 85 families widely covering different group of plants.

== Features ==
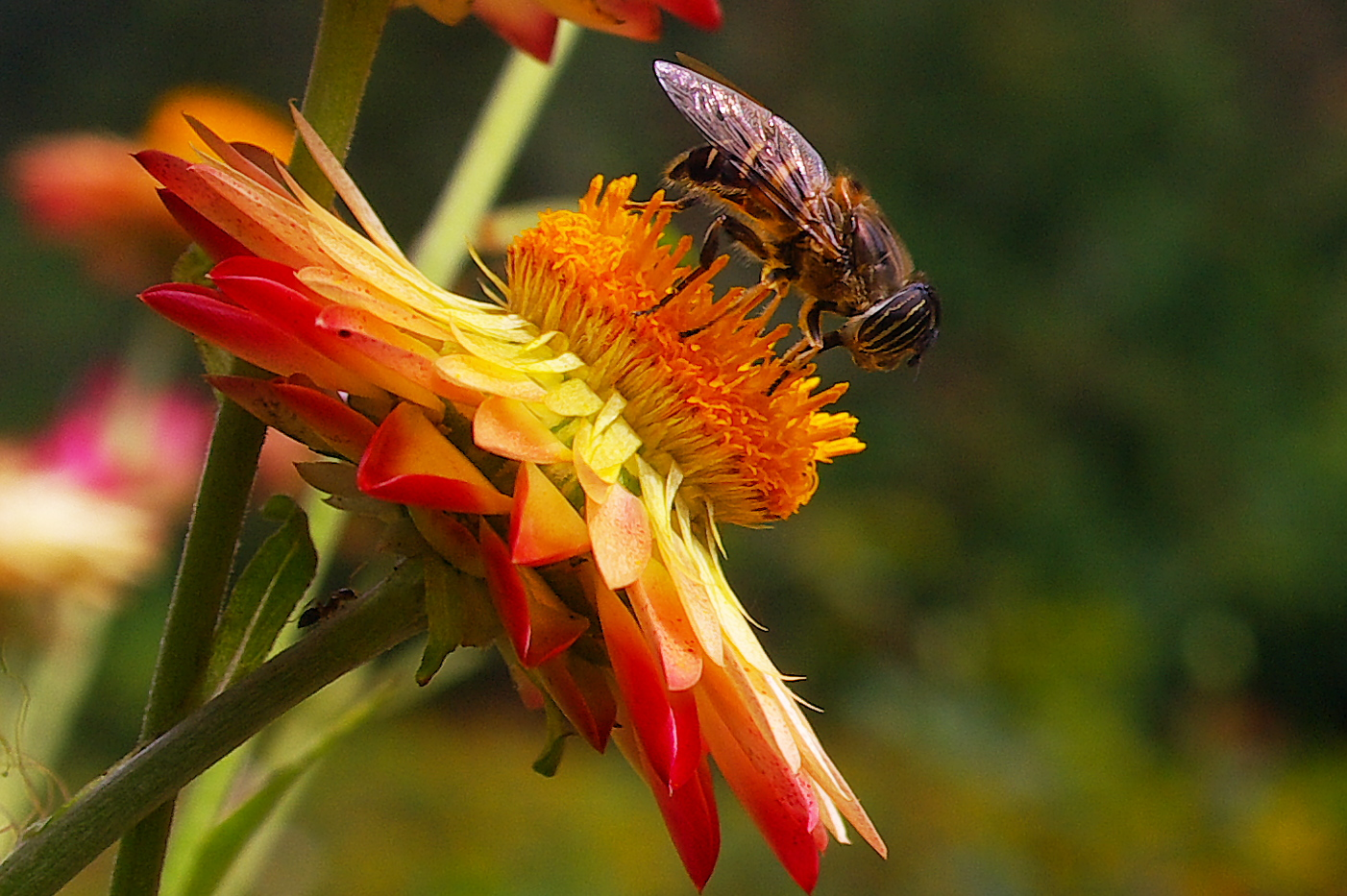
Breakfast time for the bee

The Nilgiris has a unique tropical mountain climate, so the garden has the ideal climatic conditions for growing flowers and trees. Temperature variation is less and the rainfall distribution is uniform in the locale, which results in a long flowering season. The garden is visited by thousands of tourists throughout the year and even in winter. The natural shola with winding footpaths all over the higher slopes of the park is the most distinctive and picturesque are the main feature of this park. At the head of the gardens the well kept lawns, the artistically laid out ornamental beds, looking beautiful and lacking no wealth of the flowering plants or shrub in great variety and colour are great feasts to the eyes.

== See also ==
- Nilgiri mountains
- Catherine Falls
- Lamb's Rock, Coonoor
- Law's Falls, Coonoor
- Droog Fort, Coonoor
- Dolphin's Nose, Coonoor
- Katary Falls, Coonoor
- Lady Canning's Seat, Coonoor
