= Lady Canning's Seat, Coonoor =

Lady Canning's Seat is major tourist spot in Coonoor, The Nilgiris, Tamil Nadu. It is situated 9 km from the township Coonoor. The site is named after Countess Charlotte Canning.

== See also ==
- Coonoor
- Nilgiri mountains
- Catherine Falls
- Lamb's Rock
- Sim's Park
- Droog Fort
- Dolphin's Nose
- Katary Falls
- (Ralliah dam)
