= Dolphin's Nose, Coonoor =

Tourist spot in Coonoor, The Nilgiris District, Tamil Nadu

Coordinates: 11.369°N 76.859°E

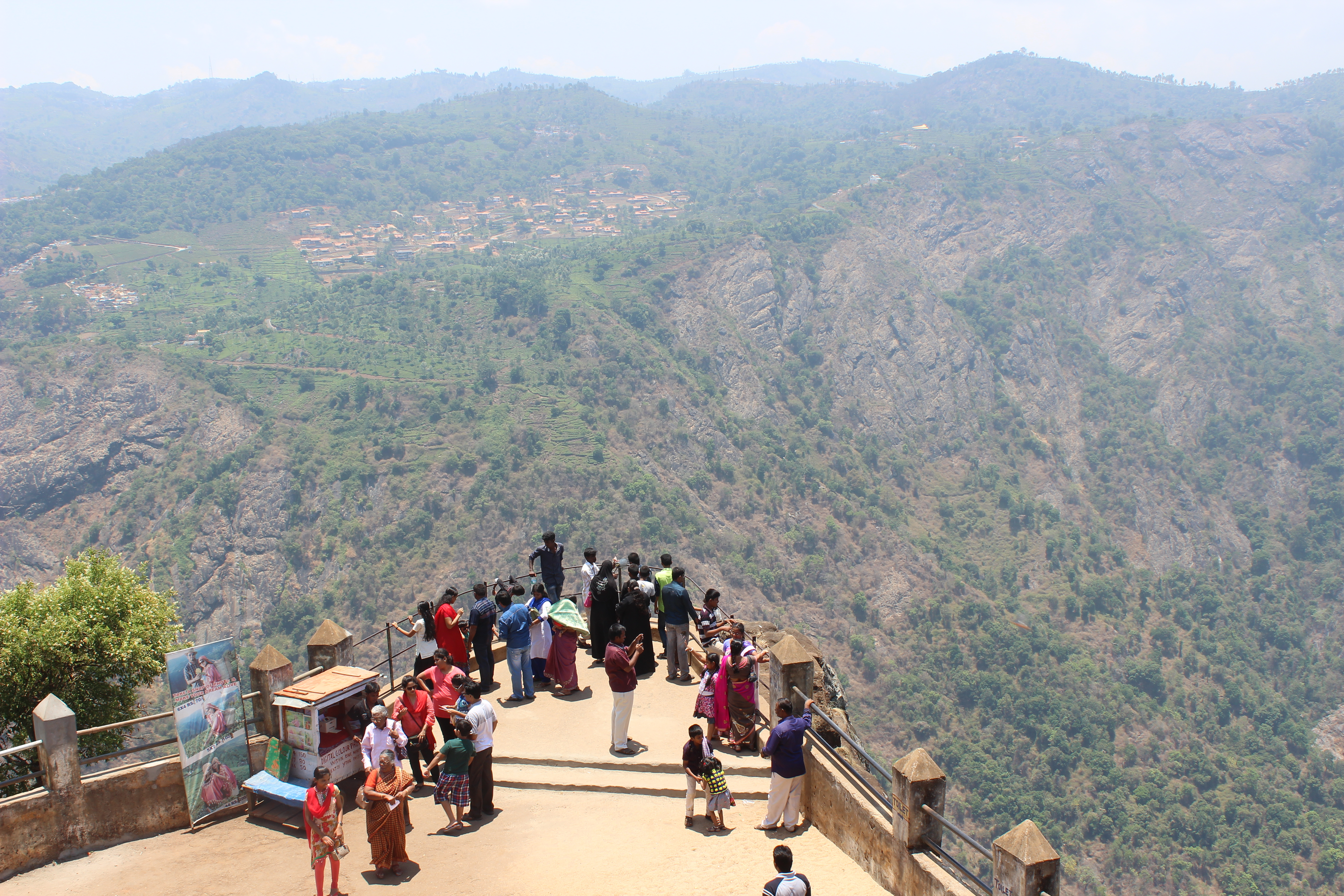
View from the Dolphin's Nose.

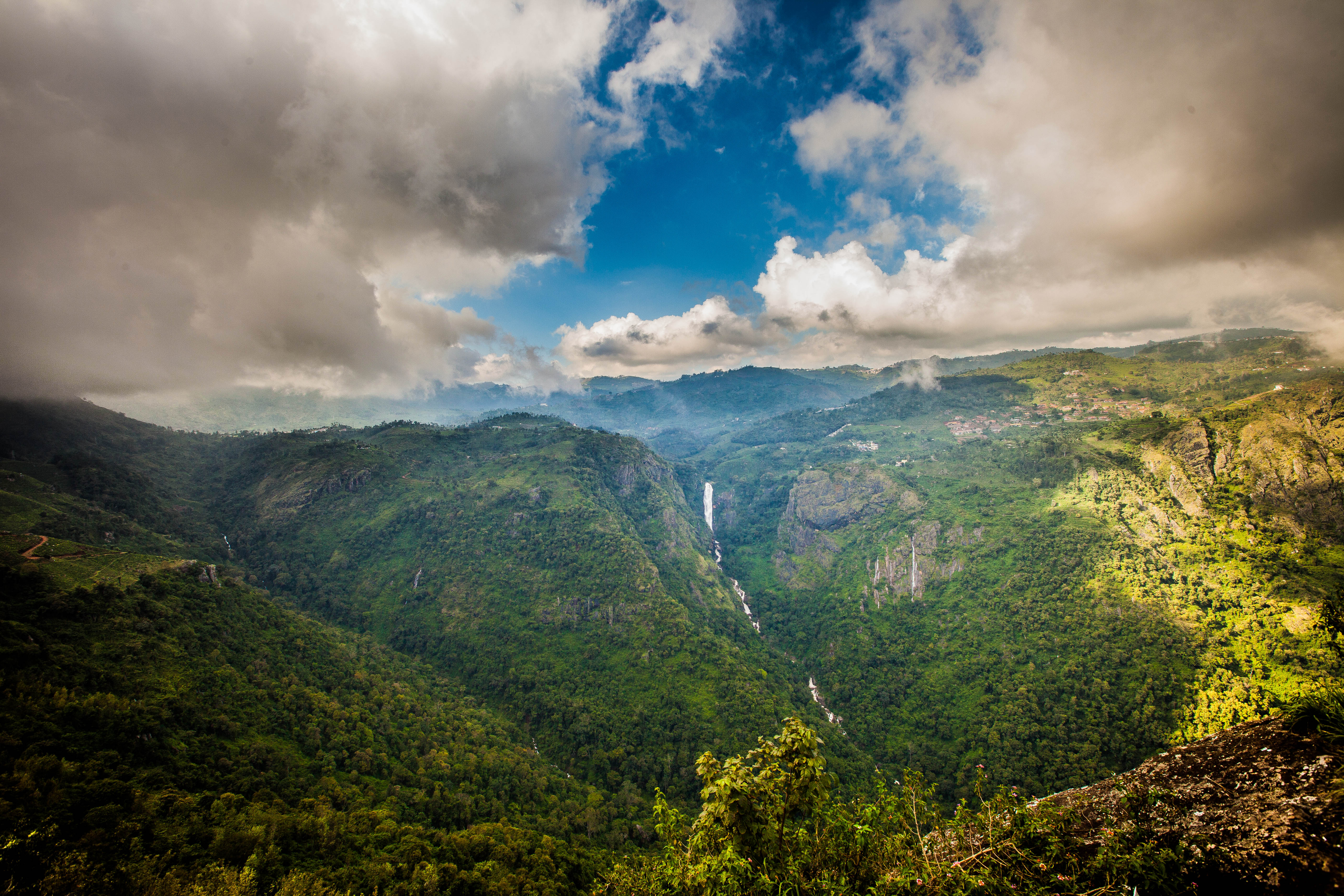
North view from the Dolphin's Nose. Catherine Falls in the center.

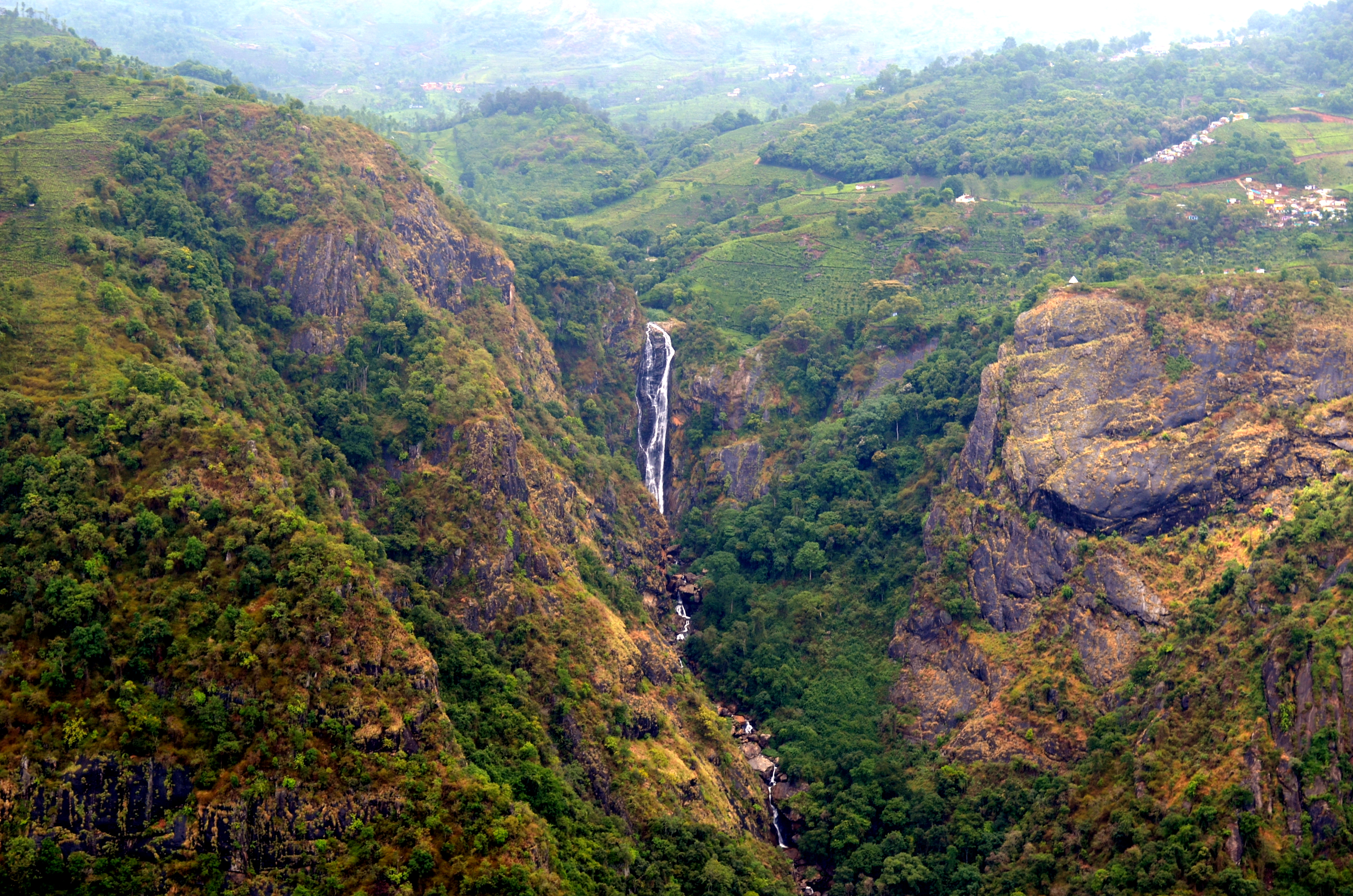
Catherine Falls

Dolphin's Nose viewpoint is a tourist spot in Coonoor, Nilgiris District, in the Indian state of Tamil Nadu.

== Geography ==
Dolphin's Nose sits over 1,550 metres (5,090 ft) above sea level. It is 10 km from Coonoor. The peak resembles a dolphin's nose, hence the name. Ravines are found to the left and right. A view of Catherine Falls several thousand metres below is a short distance away.

== Sites ==
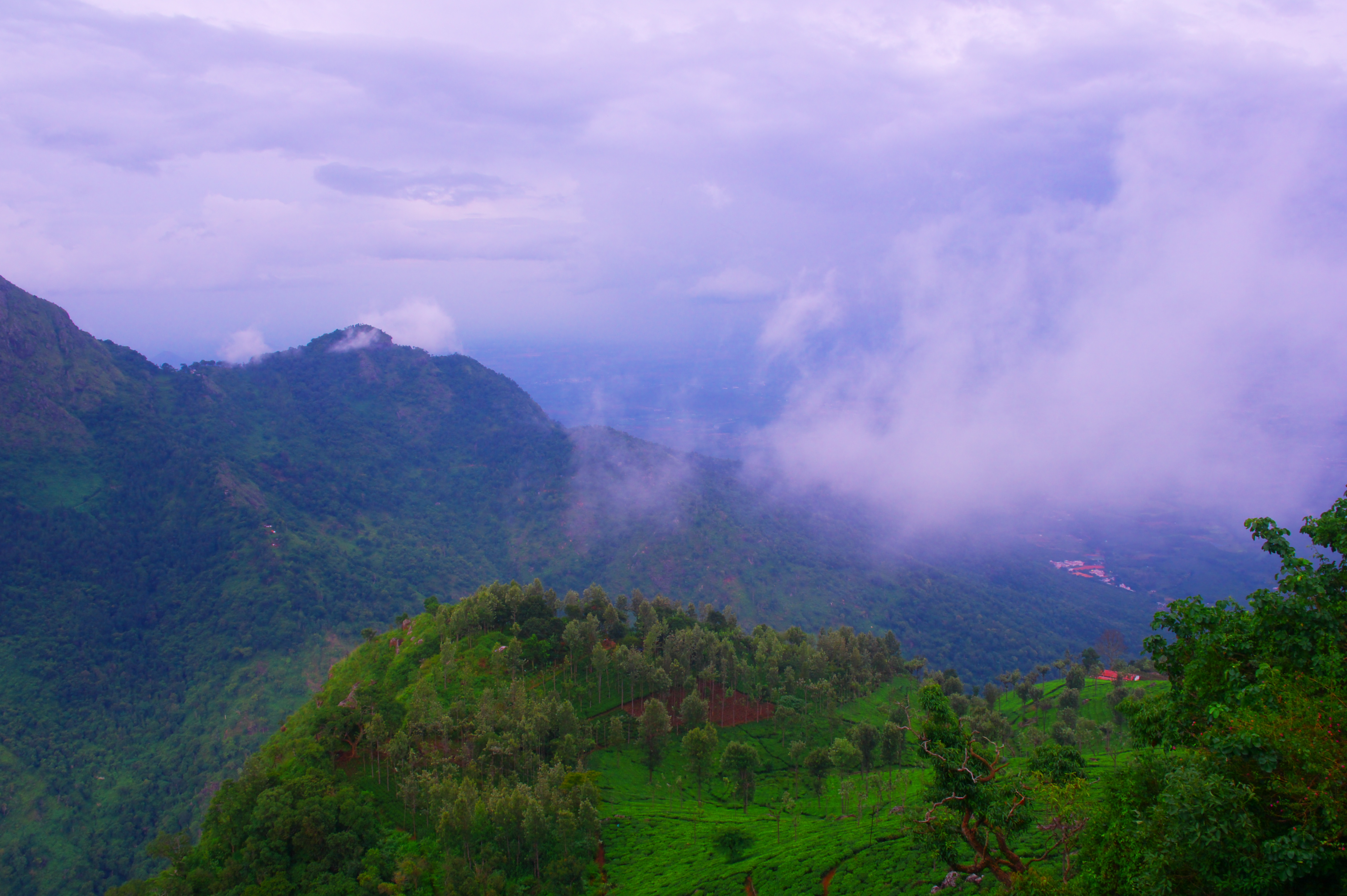
Valley view from the Dolphin Peak in Ooty, Tamil Nadu.

The following are the tourist spot in Coonoor:

- Lamb's Rock
- Sim's Park
- Droog Fort
- Law's Falls
- Katary Falls
- Lady Canning Seat

== See also ==
- Coonoor
- Nilgiri mountains
- Catherine Falls
- List of noses
