= Thanthanadu =

- village
- Country: India
- State: Tamil Nadu
- District: Nilgiris

Languages
  - Official: Tamil Badaga
- Time zone: UTC+5:30 (IST)
- PIN: 643217
- Telephone code: 04266
- Vehicle registration: TN-43
- Nearest city: Coimbatore
- Lok Sabha constituency: Nilgiris
- Vidhan Sabha constituency: Coonoor

Thanthanadu is a village in Kotagiri Municipality of The Nilgiris District, Tamil Nadu, India. The population is largely Badaga. It is located 2 km from Kotagiri. This village comprises both the Christian and the Hindu community. Tea is the major crop in this village. Thanthanadu is also known for its pear fruits.
