= Katary Falls =

Coordinates: 11.338032°N 76.736777°E

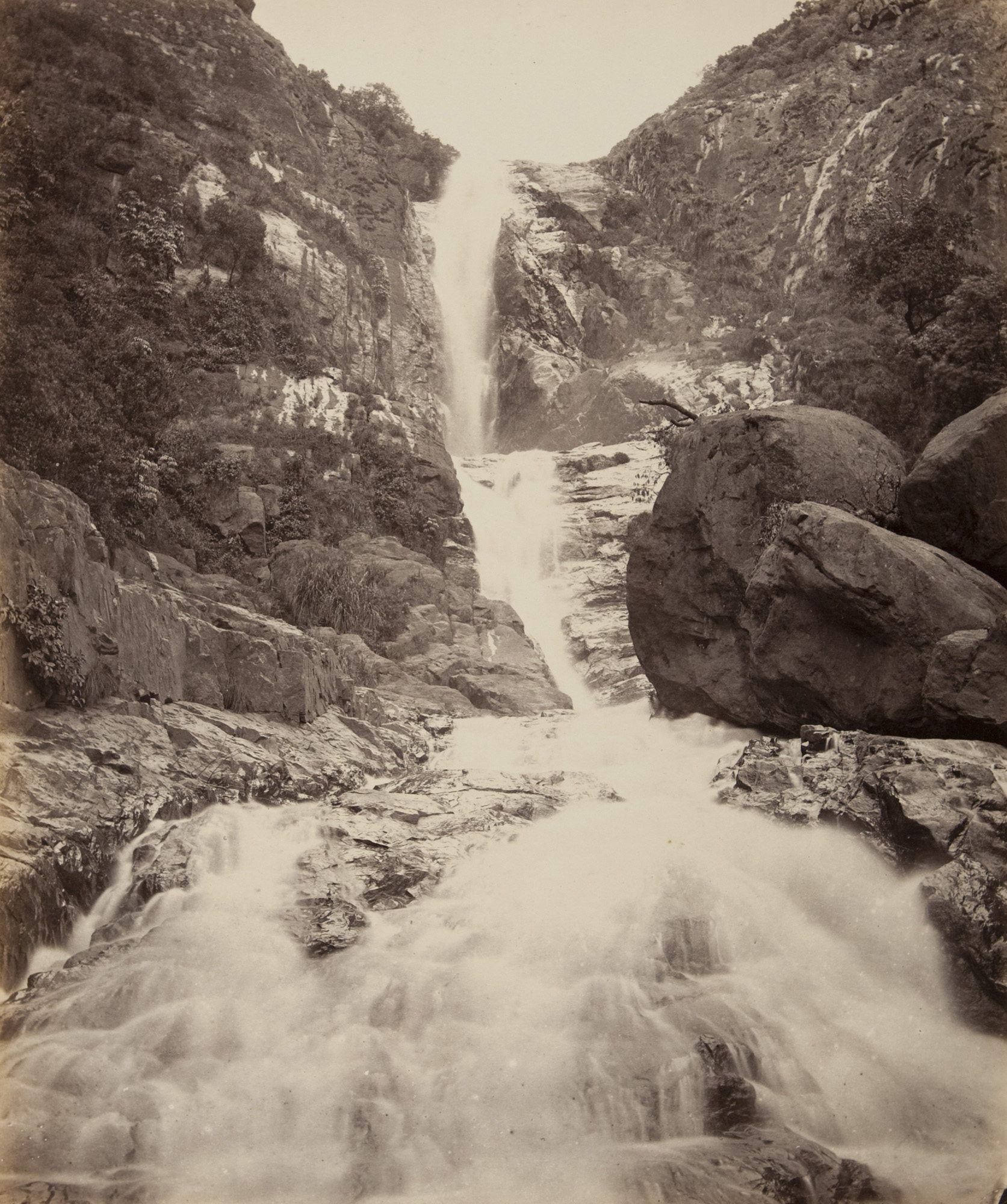
Katary Falls

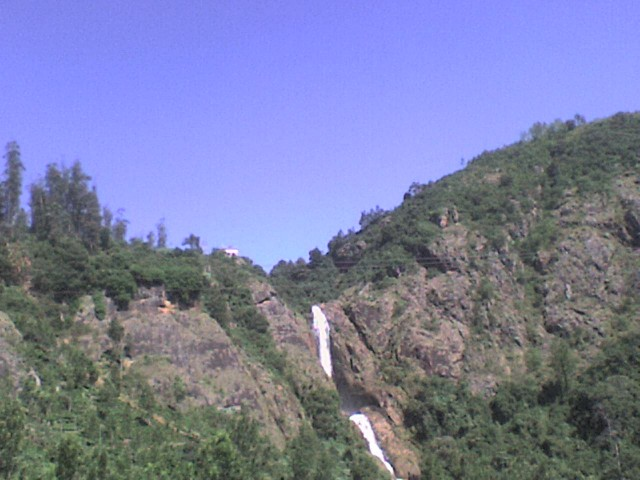
Katery Falls in 2010

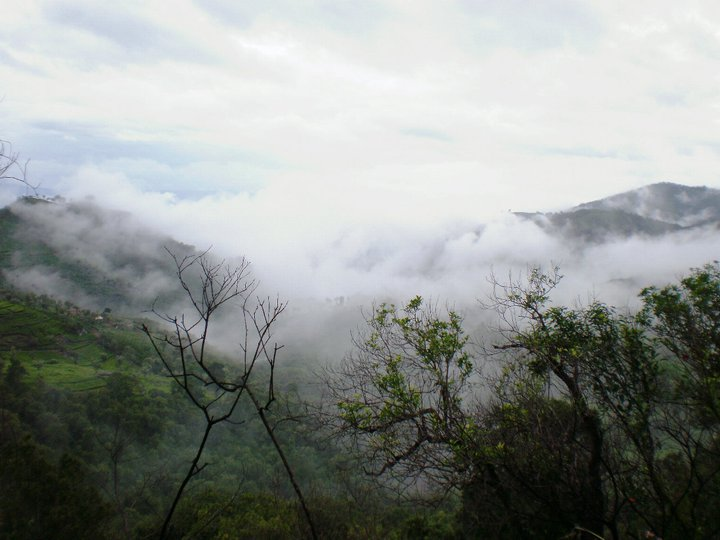
in and around Katery Falls

Katary Falls is approximately 10 km from Coonoor in the Nilgiris district in the state of Tamil Nadu, India. At 55 metres (180 ft) in height, Katary Falls is third largest waterfall in the Nilgiris; one can reach it by trecking.

The falls are the site of India's first hydel power plant, the Kateri hydroelectric system.

== See also ==
- Coonoor
- Nilgiri mountains
- Catherine Falls
- Lamb's Rock
- Sim's Park
- Law's Falls
- Dolphin's Nose
- Kateri hydro-electric system
- Lady Canning's Seat
