= John Sullivan (colonial administrator) =

Founder of the British settlement at Ootacamund

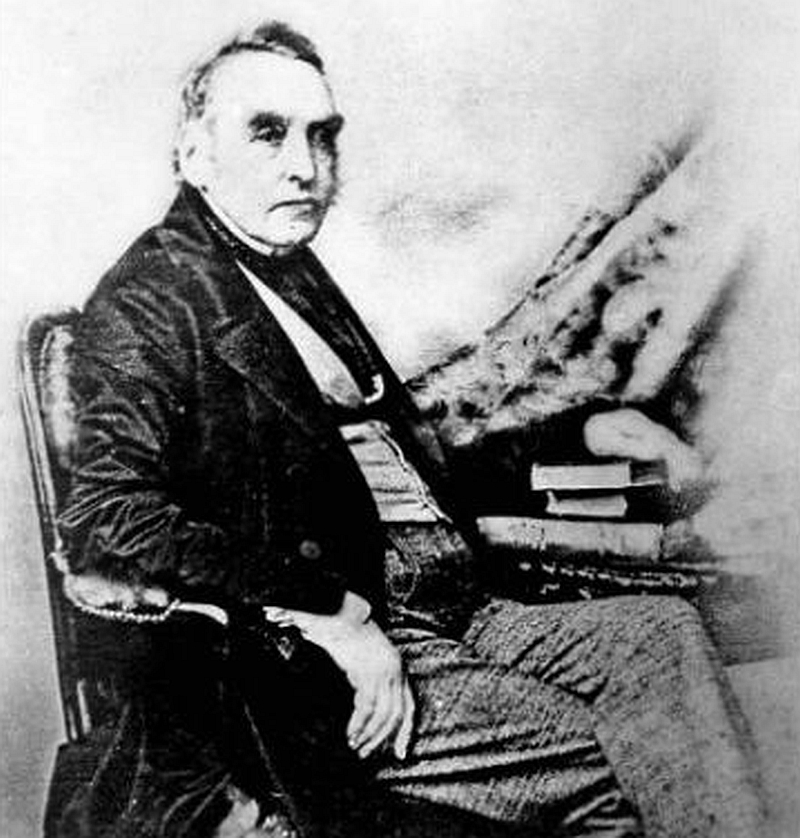
- Born: 15 June 1788; London, England
- Died: 16 January 1855 (aged 66); Berkshire, England
- Resting place: St Laurence, Upton-cum-Chalvey, Berkshire
- Monuments: Sullivan Memorial
- Known for: Founder of the British settlement at Ootacamund
- Spouse: Henrietta Cecilia Harington (1820–1821) Frances (1799–1898)

John Sullivan (15 June 1788 – 16 January 1855) was the founder of the British settlement at Ootacamund in Colonial India.

== Early life ==
Sullivan was born on 15 June 1788, to Stephen and Ann Sullivan.

== Expedition to Nilgiris ==
He came out to Company-ruled India as a writer with the EIC at age 15. In 1817, he was appointed the Collector of Coimbatore District in the Madras Presidency. He married Henrietta Cecilia Harington, a daughter of Rev. William Harington (1768–1821) and of Anne Collet (1772–1820) on 2 February 1820 in Madras. John Sullivan is best known as the founder of the British settlement at Ootacamund. But he never became the Governor of Madras Presidency.

In 1819, he set out to explore the Nilgiris after obtaining an order from the British East India Company charging him with investigating the "origin of the fabulous tales that are circulated concerning the Blue Mountains to verify their authenticity and to send a report to the authorities".

With a detachment of Europeans and Madras sepoys, he set out on his mission on 2 January 1819. The journey involved crossing rough and harsh terrain, ascending steep precipices and risking danger from wild animals. After an expedition that lasted for six days and the loss of the lives of some of the expedition members, Sullivan finally reached a plateau from where he proudly hoisted the British flag. After touring the area in 1819, John Sullivan began a personal campaign to persuade the government of Madras that the location's "unusually temperate and healthy" climate made it ideal as a "resort of invalids," primarily soldiers. In 1821 the Medical Board of the presidency ordered three assistant surgeons to investigate these claims. Their reports persuaded the Board that "we fully anticipate very great advantages from a resort to these Hills," and it recommended that fifty invalid soldiers be sent there to test the region's salubrity. Independently, Sullivan and other officials from neighbouring districts established summer residences at Ootacamund, in the heart of the Nilgiris. This nascent community soon attracted a stream of visitors in search of health, comfort and leisure.

== Colony of Ooty ==
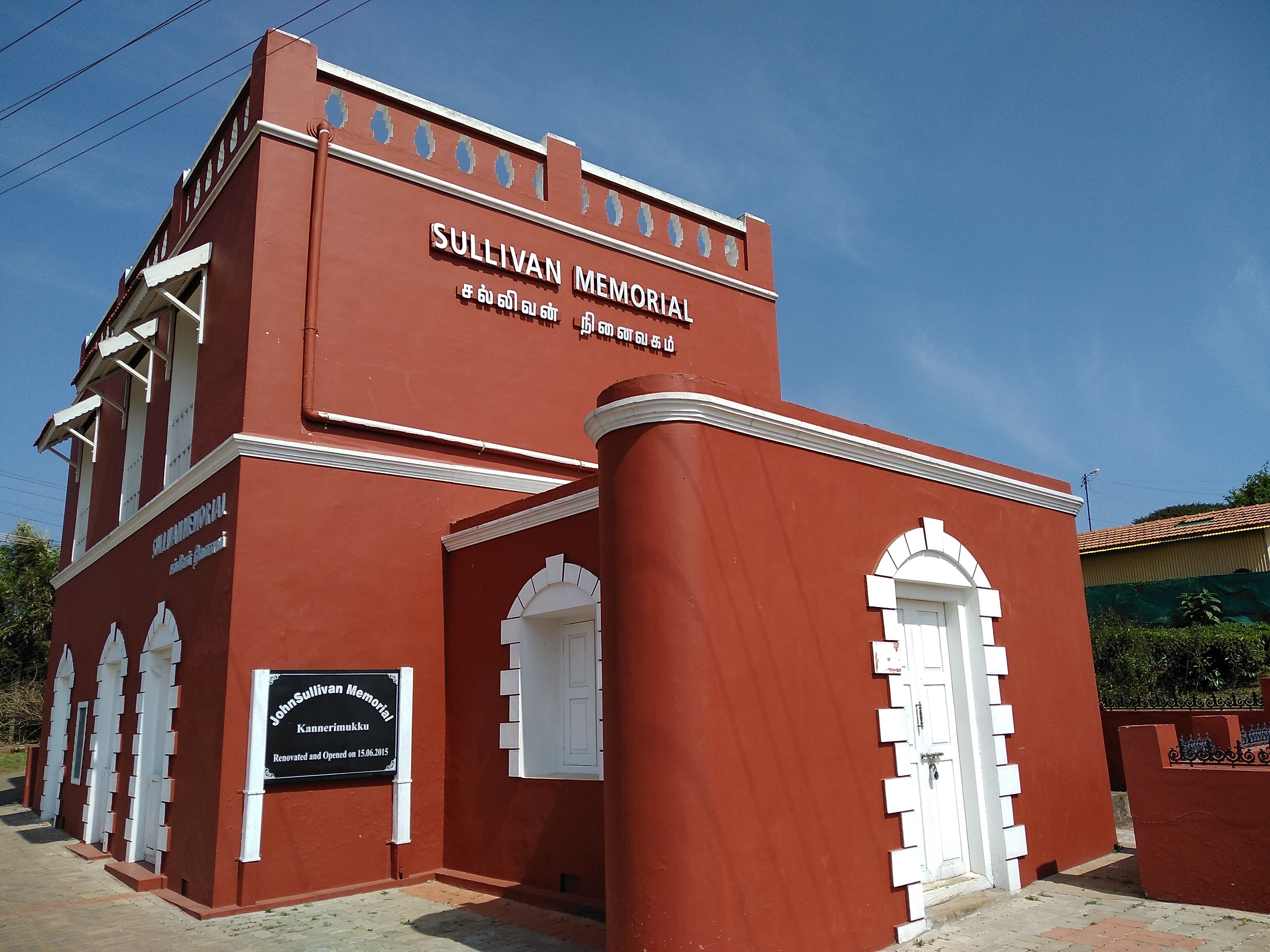
Memorial of John Sullivan in Kotagiri

Sullivan was driven by a spirit of innovation and enterprise. He was the first to introduce horticulture in the Nilgiris. Potato, barley and other "English" agricultural products are some of the crops he introduced. In 1822, John Sullivan, began construction of his residence, called the 'Stonehouse', on property he had purchased from the Todas. His wife, who had the distinction of being the first European woman in the Nilgiris, moved into the house in 1823 along with his infant son and others who made Ooty their abode including Sir Thomas Munro, the governor of Madras, who stayed at Ootacamund. The Ooty Lake was created between 1823 and 1825 by Sullivan as a source of irrigation. Years later. He explained to his superiors: "the climate is particularly salubrious, and I rejoice to say my health has derived infinite benefit from my residence in it."[9] This retreat quickly became a magnet for invalided officers and other Europeans in upper India seeking rest cures. Considering the age in which he lived, his attitudes towards the local population were remarkably progressive, arguing that the native people should be allowed to govern their own affairs. He also held that the Toda tribe had total proprietary rights over the Nilgiris, which set him at odds with East India Company officials.

By 1828 there were some 25 houses, not to mention churches and the housing of immigrants from the plains. This was also the year when Ooty was made a military cantonment. Sullivan's dream of making it a sanatorium for British troops had been fulfilled, but the Government's action meant that Ooty would no longer be in his control but in that of his rival Major William Kelso. But Sullivan wasn't through with Ooty. After he finished his tenure as Collector of Coimbatore, he returned in his capacity as the Senior Member of the Board of Revenue of the Madras Presidency.

== Return to England ==
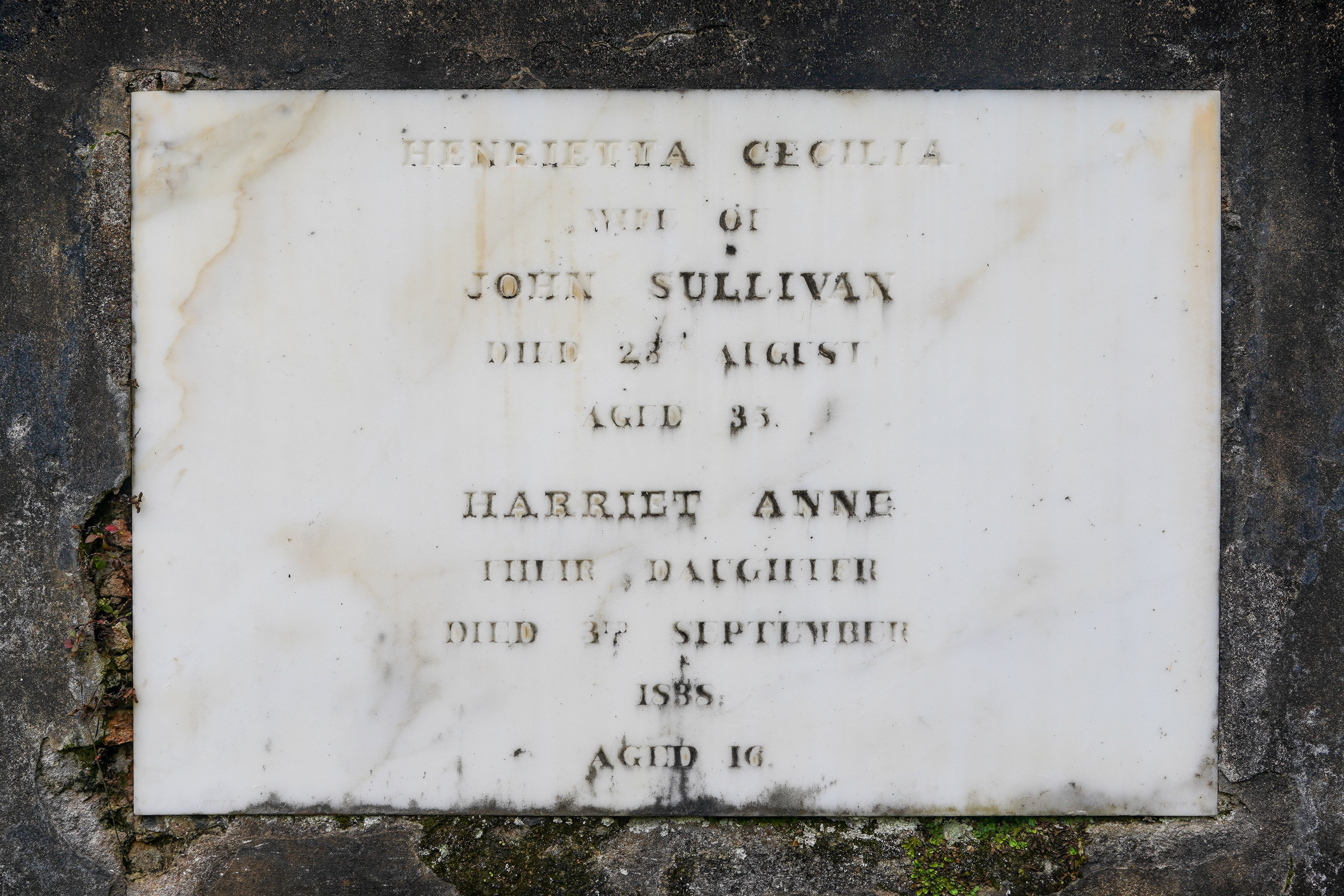
Grave of wife Henrietta and daughter Harriet in Ooty

In 1838, Sullivan's wife and daughter died within weeks of each other. John Sullivan's wife's and daughter's funeral were held at the St. Stephen's church and the graves can be seen even today. A grieving Sullivan left the hill station which he dearly loved and developed and returned to England with his eight children. He died 16 January 1855 and was buried in the churchyard of St Laurence, Upton-cum-Chalvey, Berkshire, where his grave may still be seen. The west window of the church is a memorial to him. The grave is shared by Frances, his second wife (1799–1876).

== Legacy ==
The first house which Sullivan built at the village Hosatti, near Kotagiri, is currently the only memorial left in the Nilgiris save for the font donated in his name to St. Stephen's Church by Col. & Mrs. Gilhlan in 1872. The house is known as the "Sullivan's Bungalow" and is located in a village called Kannerimukku, near Kotagiri town. Sullivan contributed to the diversified commercial crops in the region, introducing potatoes and other European vegetables to the local community at that time to Badagas and Kotas, and played a very important role in developing the district as well as its headquarters – Ootacamund [now called Udhagamandalam, in short Ooty] which is an important Hill Station. Under Sullivan's influence local roads, a market, and such civic buildings as a courthouse, a hospital, a post office, a bank and a jail arose. He also played an important role in developing the economy of several local tribes. John Sullivan is regarded with great respect by the locals even today, for his contribution to the district of the Nilgiris (also known as the Blue Mountains).

His son, Henry Edward Sullivan, also became a Collector at Coimbatore and is noted in the memoirs of Madame Helene Blavatsky whom he entertained at Ooty in 1869. A second son, Augustus William Sullivan, also served in the Madras Civil Service, born in 1813; he died in 1858 and is buried at St. John's Cemetery in Tellicherry.

A bronze statue of Sullivan was unveiled near the Government Botanical Garden, Ooty in May 2022 by M. K. Stalin, the then Chief Minister of Tamil Nadu.
