= Nilgiri Christian Guest Homes Association =

The Nilgiri Christian Guest Homes Association is a Protestant trust of uncertain origins that was set up to run guest houses in the scenic Nilgiri Hills or blue mountains of Southern India. It is a non-profit venture that provides places of rest and relaxation to Evangelical Protestant missionaries on the field. It is known to have consisted of at least three properties of which only the first is still functional:

- Brooklands, Coonoor
- Queenshill, Kotagiri
- Selbourne, Ooty
