= Moyar hydro-electric power house =

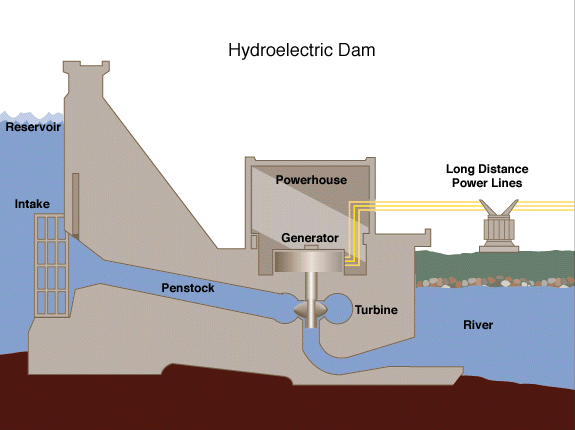
Power plant layout

The Moyar Power House is a hydroelectric power station located in the Nilgiris, Tamil Nadu, India. It is run by the Tamil Nadu State Electricity Board. It is 48 km from Ooty and 36 km from Gudalur. The power plant is situated at the bottom of the Moyar Gorge and is accessed by a winch system from the plateau above.

== Details ==
The installed capacity of power house is 36MW, consisting of 3 units with 12MW capacity each. The first two units were commissioned in 1960, and the third was commissioned in 1964.Moyar power house renovation 12MW to 14 MW of each unit from 2022 under construction by ANDRITZ india.

The elevation of the power station is 609 meters and the water source for the power house is from Moyar Forebay Dam, Maravakandy Dam, Pyakara Power House tail race and has a dam capacity of 446.25 Cusec.

== See also ==
- Kundah hydro-electric power house
- Kateri hydro-electric system
- Maravakandy hydro-electric Power House
- Pykara
