= Rangaswamy Peak and Pillar =

Tourist attraction in Nilgiris

Coordinates: 11.460833°N 76.986944°E

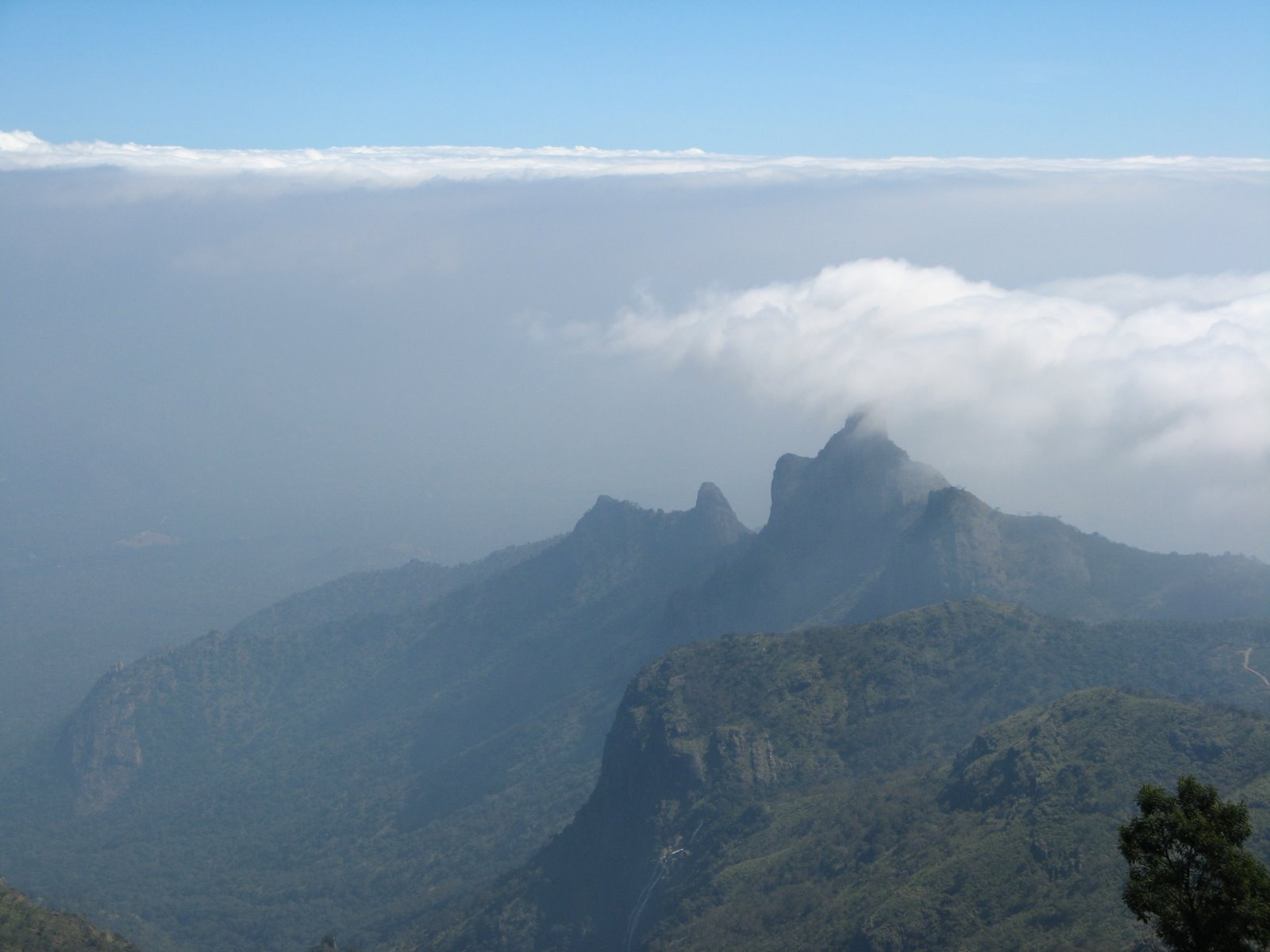
Rangasamy Peak

Rangaswamy Peak and Pillar is a rocky column in Kotagiri, The Nilgiris, Tamil Nadu. It is located at a distance of 20 km from Kotagiri.

== Rangaswamy Peak ==
The height of Rangaswamy Peak is above 5,885 ft (1,794 m) and it is visible from Kodanad View Point. This is the most sacred place for the Irulas who hold it as the home of the deity Rangaswamy and the Badagas who hold their rituals of Giri Habba. It is also known as Rangabottu and hosts an annual harvest-fertility festival.

== Rangaswamy Pillar ==
Rangaswamy Pillar is found on the northwest side of Rangaswamy Peak. The height of the pillar is about 400 feet. It was in this Peak that a DC-3 Air India plane carrying the statistician Abraham Wald crashed on 13 December 1950.

== See also ==
- Kotagiri
- Ooty
- Coonoor
