= Kundah Power House =

Power station in Tamil Nadu, India

Coordinates: 11°16′00″N 76°36′30″E

The Kundah Power House is located in the Nilgiris, Tamil Nadu, India. It is one of the biggest electricity generating schemes in Tamil Nadu. The group of peaks Devarbatta, Karaikada, Koulingabetta and Porthimund, all over 2400 Metres ASL (above sea level) drain into two streams, Avalanche and Emerald. Total estimated cost of the Kundah scheme is Rs. 35 44 lakhs. This project is whole of it Canadian Aid under the Colombo Plan Avalanche and Emerald Dams, along with Upper Bhavani, form the major source of water for the Kundah hydro-electric project. The project is a symbol of India-Canada friendship and co-operation. The project was executed by then TNEB Civil engineer R.S. Sankaranarayanan (Retd.), Chennai The Power houses were commissioned from the year 1960 to 1964.

== Generation ==
=== Kundah Power House 1 ===
Kundah Power House 1 is located in Kundah Bridge, 25 km from Ooty. There are 3 units and the installed capacity of the power house is 60MW. The water source for the power house is Avalanche and Emerald Dams.

=== Kundah Power House 2 ===
Kundah Power House 2 is located at Geddai, 16 km from Kundah/Manjoor. There are 5 units and the installed capacity of power house is 175MW. The water source for the power house is Kundah forebay dam, (the tail race water of Power House-1) and its Forebay Capacity is 1000 Cusec.

=== Kundah Power House 3 ===
Kundah power house 3 is located at Parali and its installed capacity is 180 MW (3*60)...This power house has one of the big power generating unit in kundah circle

=== Kundah Power House 4 ===
Kundah Power House 4 is located at Pillur. There are 2 units and the installed capacity of the power house is 100MW. The water source for the power house is Pillur Dam, the tail race water of Power House 3) and its Forbay Capacity is 6000 Cusec.

=== Kundah Power House 5 ===
Kundah Power House 5 is located at Avalanche, 18 km from Kundah. There are 2 units and the installed capacity of the power house is 40MW. The water source for the power house is Western Catchment Dam 1 and Upper Bhavani Dam and its Forebay Capacity is 700 Cusec.

=== Kundah Power House 6 ===
Kundah Power House 6 is located at Kattukuppai. There is 1 unit and the installed capacity of the power house is 30MW. The water source for the power house is Western Catchment Dams 2 & 3, Porthimund Dam and Parsons Valley Dam, and its Forebay Capacity is 683 Cusec.

== See also ==
- Kateri hydro-electric system
- Tamil Nadu Electricity Board
- Moyar hydro-electric Power House
- Maravakandy hydro-electric Power House
