= Kateri hydroelectric system =

Hydroelectric power station in Tamil Nadu, India

Hydroelectric Power house

The Kateri (Katery) hydro electric power station is located in Nilgiris, Tamil Nadu, India. It is a series of dams and a power house with four 125 KW generators and one 500 KW. The plant powers the Cordite Factory at Aruvankadu.

A reservoir with a capacity of 12.25 million cubic feet was created by the first dam, which was completed in 1902. A second reservoir with capacity of 10 million cubic feet was formed by the second dam, completed in 1916.

== Other hydro-electric systems ==
The following are the other hydro-electric systems in the Nilgiris district:

- Pykara hydro-electric systems
- Moyar hydro-electric systems
- Kundah hydro-electric systems
- Mukurthi micro power house
- Maravakandy Power House

== See also ==
- Kundah hydro-electric power house
- Maravakandy hydro-electric Power House
- Moyar hydro-electric Power House
- Pykara
- Katary Falls
