= Maravakandy hydro-electric power house =

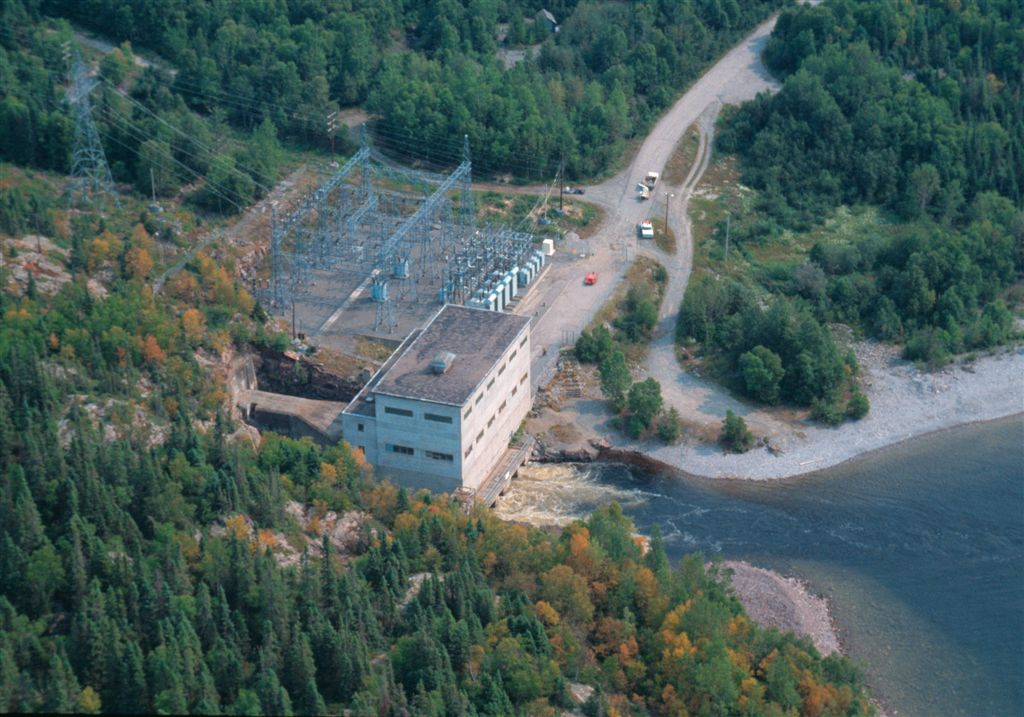
Hydro electric power house

Maravakandy Power House is located in Gudalur, Nilgiris, Tamil Nadu, India. It is controlled by the Tamil Nadu State Electricity Board and is 32 km from the Ooty. The elevation of the power house is above 884 meters and the installation capacity is 750KW.

== See also ==
- Kundah hydro-electric power house
- Kateri hydro-electric system
- Moyar hydro-electric Power House
- Pykara
