= Kodanad View Point =

Scenic viewpoint in Tamil Nadu, India

Coordinates: 11.5253°N 76.9160°E

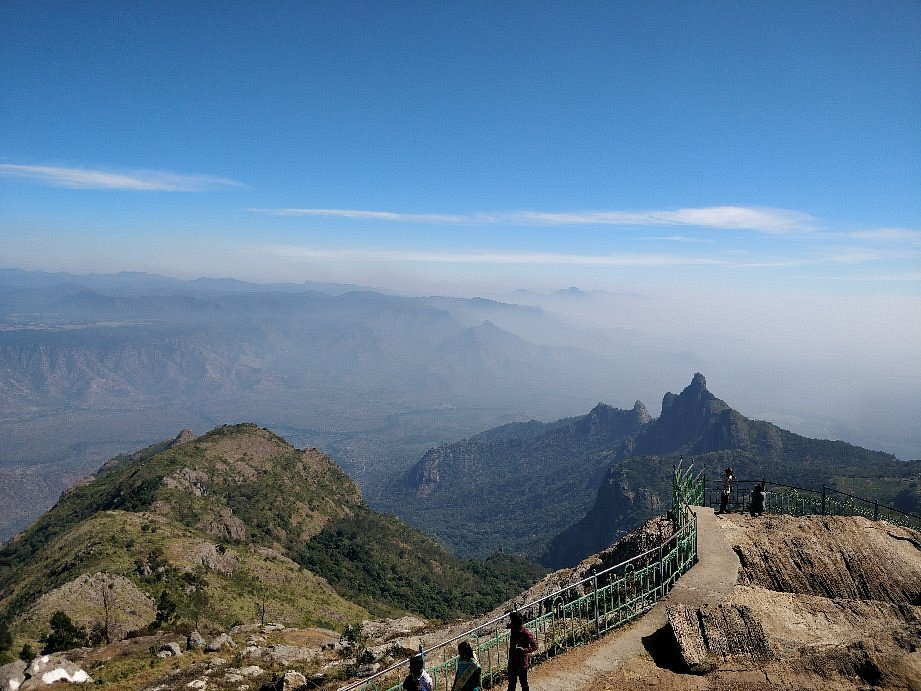
View from Kodanad View Point. Looking ENE.

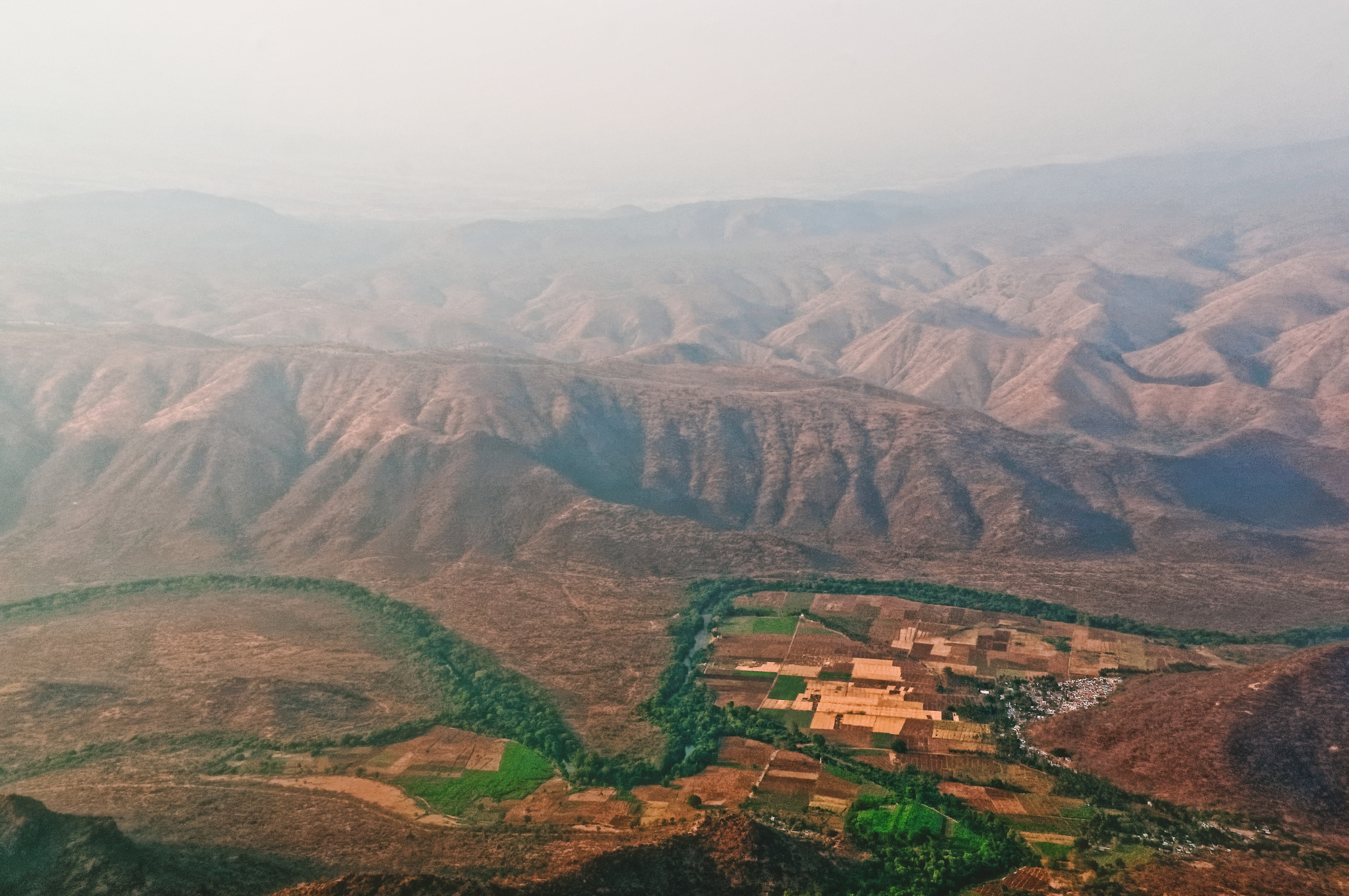
Looking north.

Kodanad view point is a tourist spot in Kotagiri, Nilgiris district, in the Indian state of Tamil Nadu.

== Location ==
It is located about 18 km east of Kotagiri on the eastern edges of Nilgiris. Due to its location, it is also called the Terminus Country.

== See also ==
- Catherine Falls
