= Kotagiri =

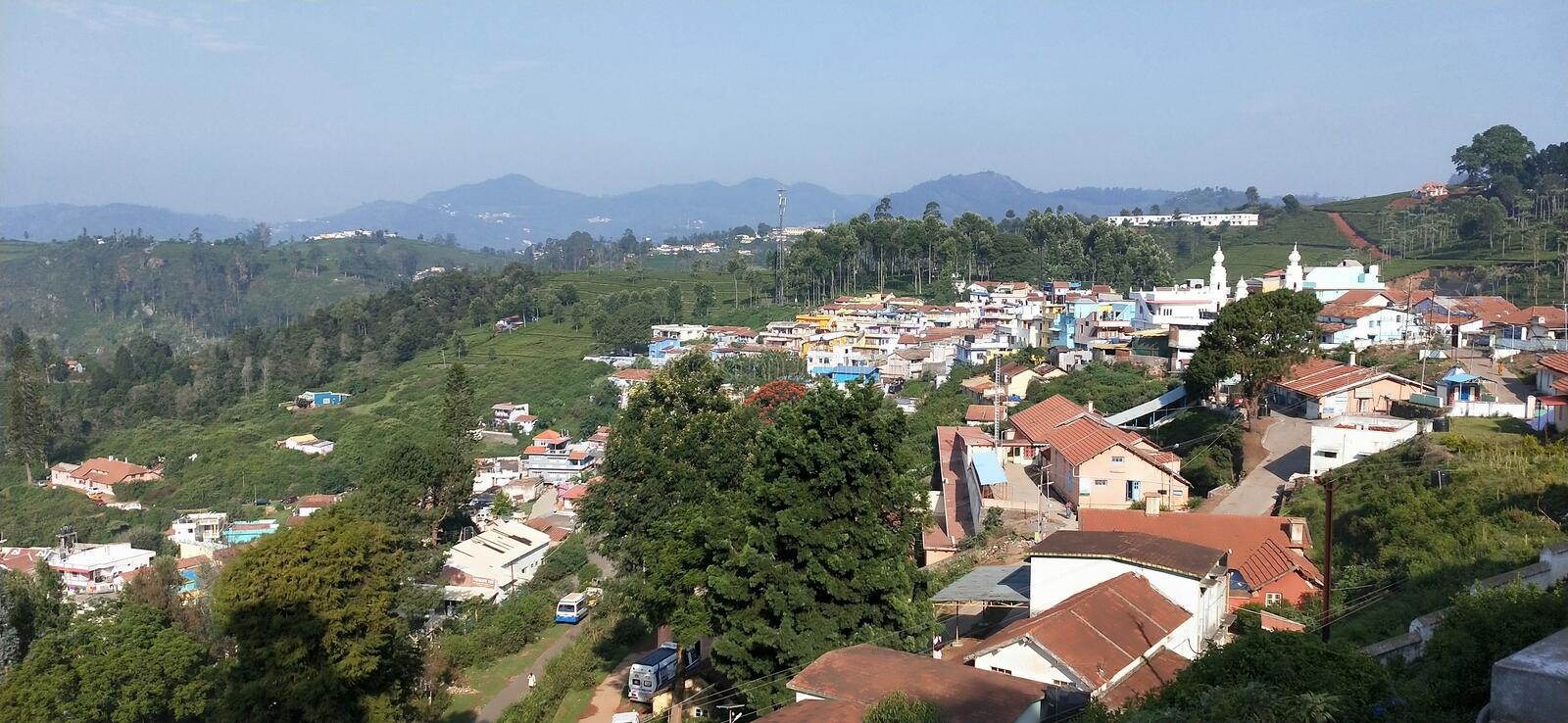
- Nickname: KTG
- Location within Tamil Nadu
- Coordinates: 11.43°N 76.88°E
- Country: India
- State: Tamil Nadu
- District: The Nilgiris

Government
  - Type: Second Grade
  - Body: Municipality
- Elevation: 1,950 m (6,400 ft)

Population (2011)
  - Total: 28,207

Language
  - Official: Tamil
- Time zone: UTC+5:30
- Postal code: 643217
- Area code: 04266
- Vehicle registration: TN43

Kotagiri is a hill station and a municipality in the Nilgiris district of the Indian state of Tamil Nadu. The Nilgiri Hills have been the traditional home of the "Kota" tribes. The name "Kota-giri" itself means 'mountains of the Kotas'. Kotagiri was known in the past as 'Kota-keri' or 'Kota-gherry', the 'street of Kotas'. The town has developed around numerous knolls and valleys. Located at an average elevation of 1,950 m (6,400 ft), it was one of the summer resorts of the Madras Presidency. The British administrator John Sullivan visited the area in 1819, arriving at a village called Dhimbatty to the north of Kotagiri.

== Demographics ==
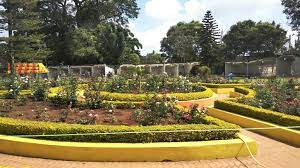
Nehru Park

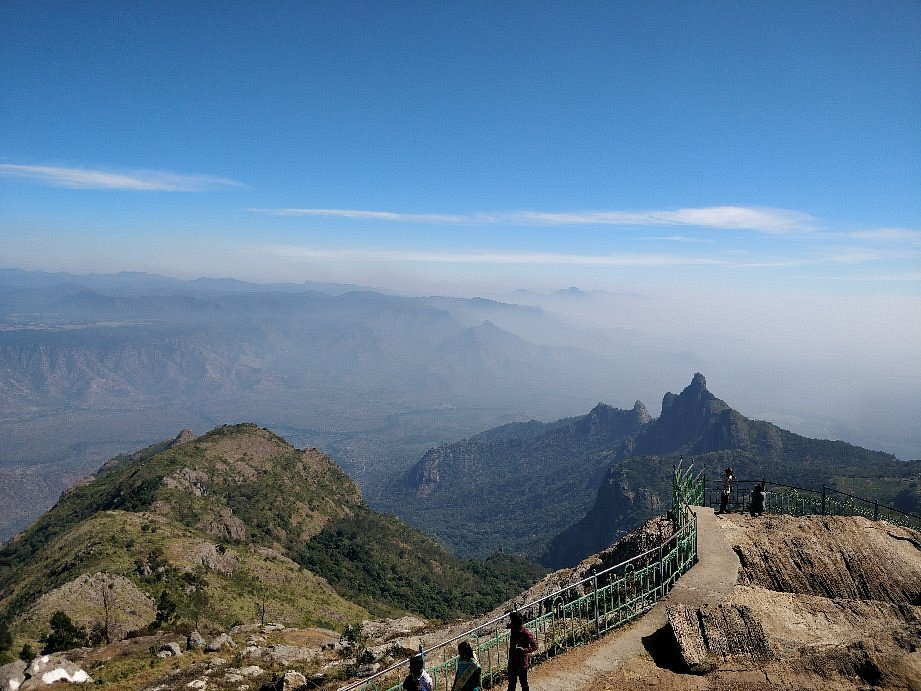
Kodanad View Point

As of 2011, according to the India census, the Kotagiri second-grade municipality has a population of 28,207, of which 13,607 are males while 14,600 are females. The population of children aged 0–6 is 2,340, which is 8.30% of the total population of Kotagiri (TP). In Kotagiri, the Female Sex Ratio is 1073 against state average of 996. Child Sex Ratio is 945 compared to the Tamil Nadu state average of 943. The literacy rate of Kotagiri is 86.79% — higher than state average of 80.09%. The male literacy rate is around 93.55%, while the female literacy rate is 80.57%.

== Educational institutions ==
Kotagiri has a District Institute of Education and Training (DIET), a district resource centre for teacher training. It operates under the State Council of Educational Research and Training.

The NPA Centenary Polytechnic College was established in 1991 by the NPA Centenary Charitable Trust, formed by the Nilgiri Planters' Association to mark its centenary. A government-aided institution approved by the All India Council for Technical Education, it offers three-year diploma programmes in engineering.

The town also has a number of government, aided and private schools across the Kotagiri block.

== Landmarks ==
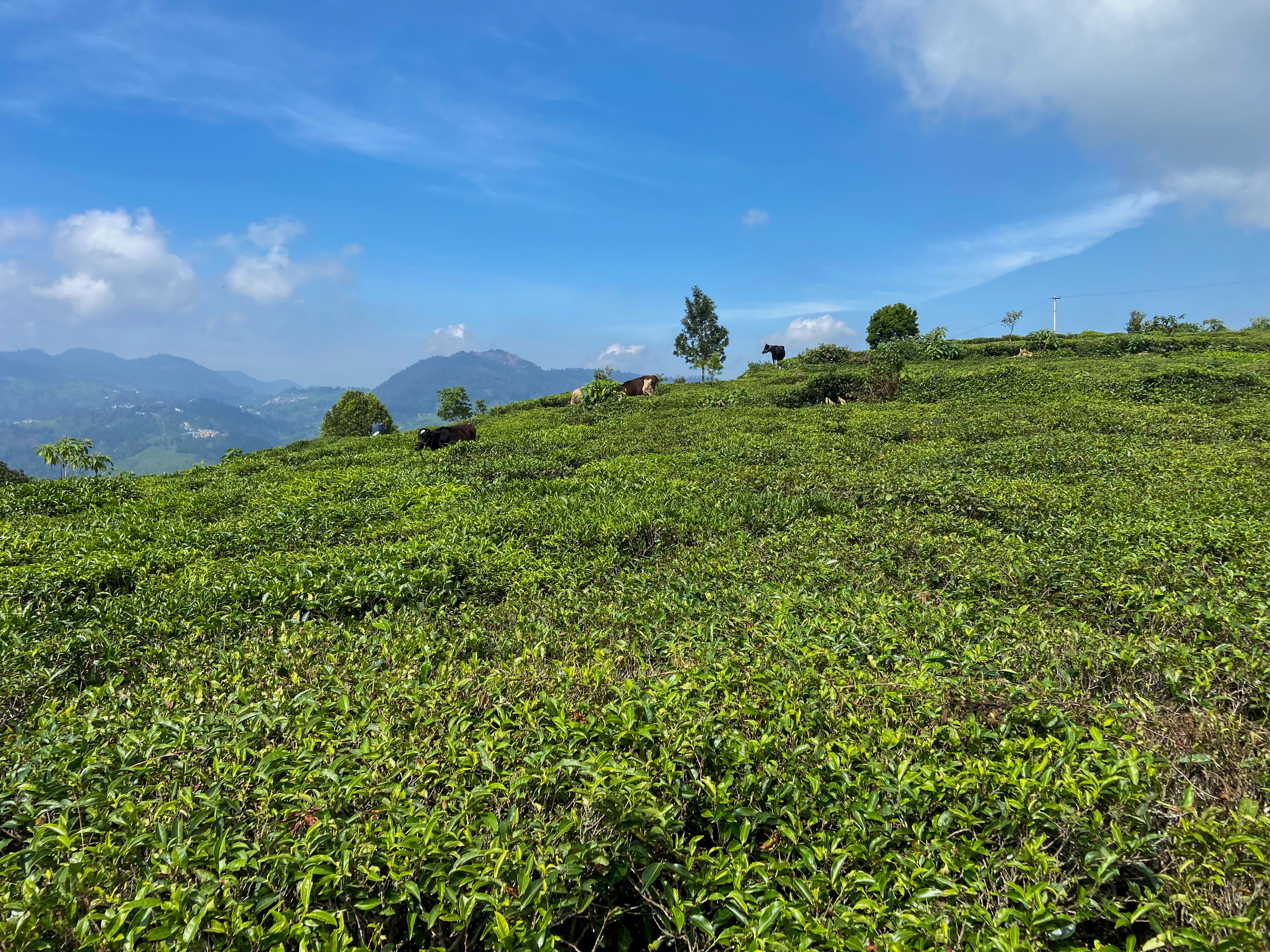
Tea cultivation is the main land use around Kotagiri.

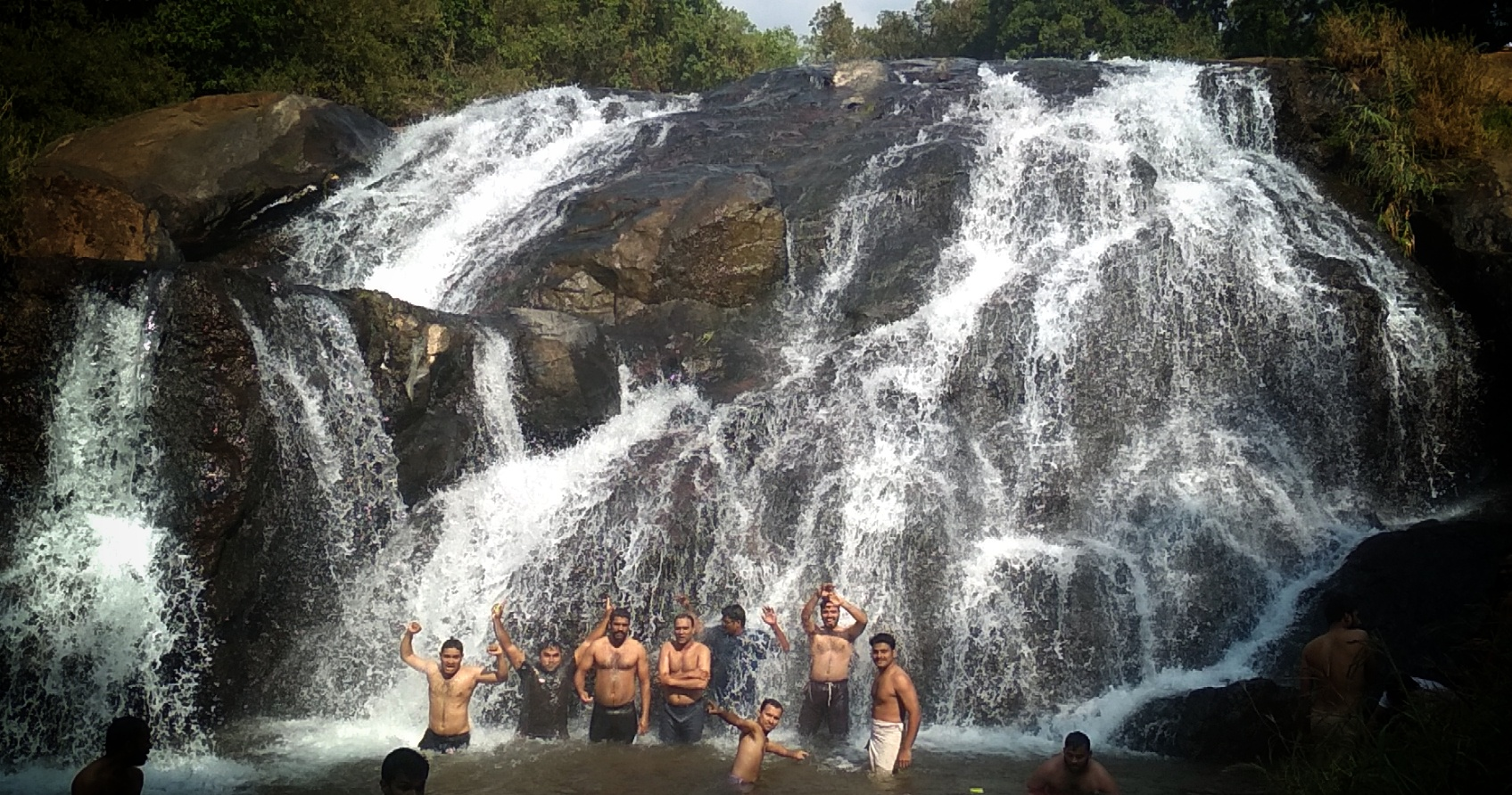
Catherine Falls

Longwood Shola, on the edge of the town, received QCC accreditation in 2022. Nehru Park hosts the annual vegetable show that opens the Nilgiris summer festival. Other landmarks in and around the town include Kodanad View Point, Catherine Falls, Rangaswamy Peak and Pillar, Elk Falls and the John Sullivan Memorial.

== Revenue villages ==
The Kotagiri Taluk consists of the following official revenue villages.

#	Villages	Administrative Division	Population (2011)
1	Aracode	Kotagiri	781
2	Denad	Kotagiri	8,284
3	Hallimoyar	Kotagiri	225
4	Jackanarai	Kotagiri	4,602
5	Jagathala	Kotagiri	N/A
6	Kadinamala	Kotagiri	407
7	Kallampalayam	Kotagiri	1,691
8	Kengarai	Kotagiri	6,820
9	Kil-Kotagiri	Kotagiri	N/A
10	Kodanad	Kotagiri	4,153
11	Kokkode	Kotagiri	147
12	Konavakorai	Kotagiri	7,511
13	Kotagiri	Kotagiri	N/A
14	Naduhatty	Kotagiri	10,278
15	Nandhipuram	Kotagiri	172
16	Nedugula	Kotagiri	13,071

== Climate ==
Climate data for Kotagiri
Month	Jan	Feb	Mar	Apr	May	Jun	Jul	Aug	Sep	Oct	Nov	Dec	Year
Mean daily maximum °C (°F)	23.7 (74.7)	25.3 (77.5)	27.4 (81.3)	28.7 (83.7)	28.1 (82.6)	25.6 (78.1)	24.6 (76.3)	24.5 (76.1)	24.9 (76.8)	24.1 (75.4)	23.0 (73.4)	22.8 (73.0)	25.2 (77.4)
Daily mean °C (°F)	18.7 (65.7)	20.2 (68.4)	22.2 (72.0)	23.5 (74.3)	23.2 (73.8)	21.4 (70.5)	20.7 (69.3)	20.6 (69.1)	20.8 (69.4)	20.2 (68.4)	19.3 (66.7)	18.6 (65.5)	20.8 (69.4)
Mean daily minimum °C (°F)	14.2 (57.6)	15.2 (59.4)	17.2 (63.0)	19.0 (66.2)	19.5 (67.1)	18.5 (65.3)	17.9 (64.2)	17.7 (63.9)	17.6 (63.7)	17.3 (63.1)	16.3 (61.3)	14.9 (58.8)	17.1 (62.8)
Average precipitation mm (inches)	24 (0.9)	27 (1.1)	49 (1.9)	92 (3.6)	171 (6.7)	209 (8.2)	206 (8.1)	186 (7.3)	146 (5.7)	207 (8.1)	139 (5.5)	58 (2.3)	1,514 (59.4)
Average precipitation days	4	4	6	11	18	18	18	17	15	16	12	7	146
Average relative humidity (%)	66	58	54	60	70	80	82	82	80	82	80	73	72
Mean monthly sunshine hours	8.5	9.3	9.9	10	9.2	8.2	7.7	7.6	7.7	6.9	6.7	7.5	99.2
