= Catherine Falls =

Waterfall in Tamil Nadu, India

Coordinates: 11.384°N 76.855°E

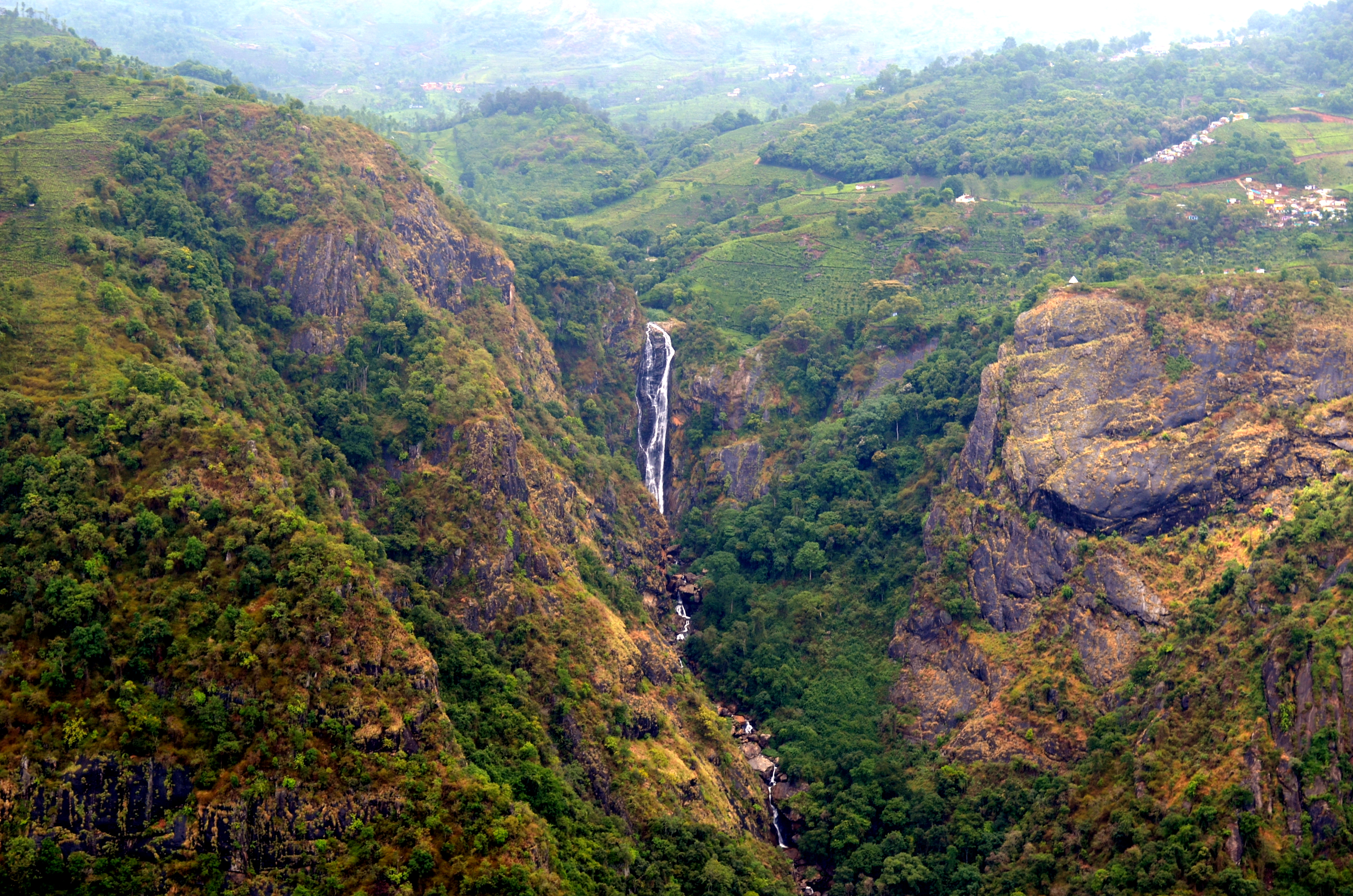
Catherine's Falls from Dolphin's Nose Viewpoint

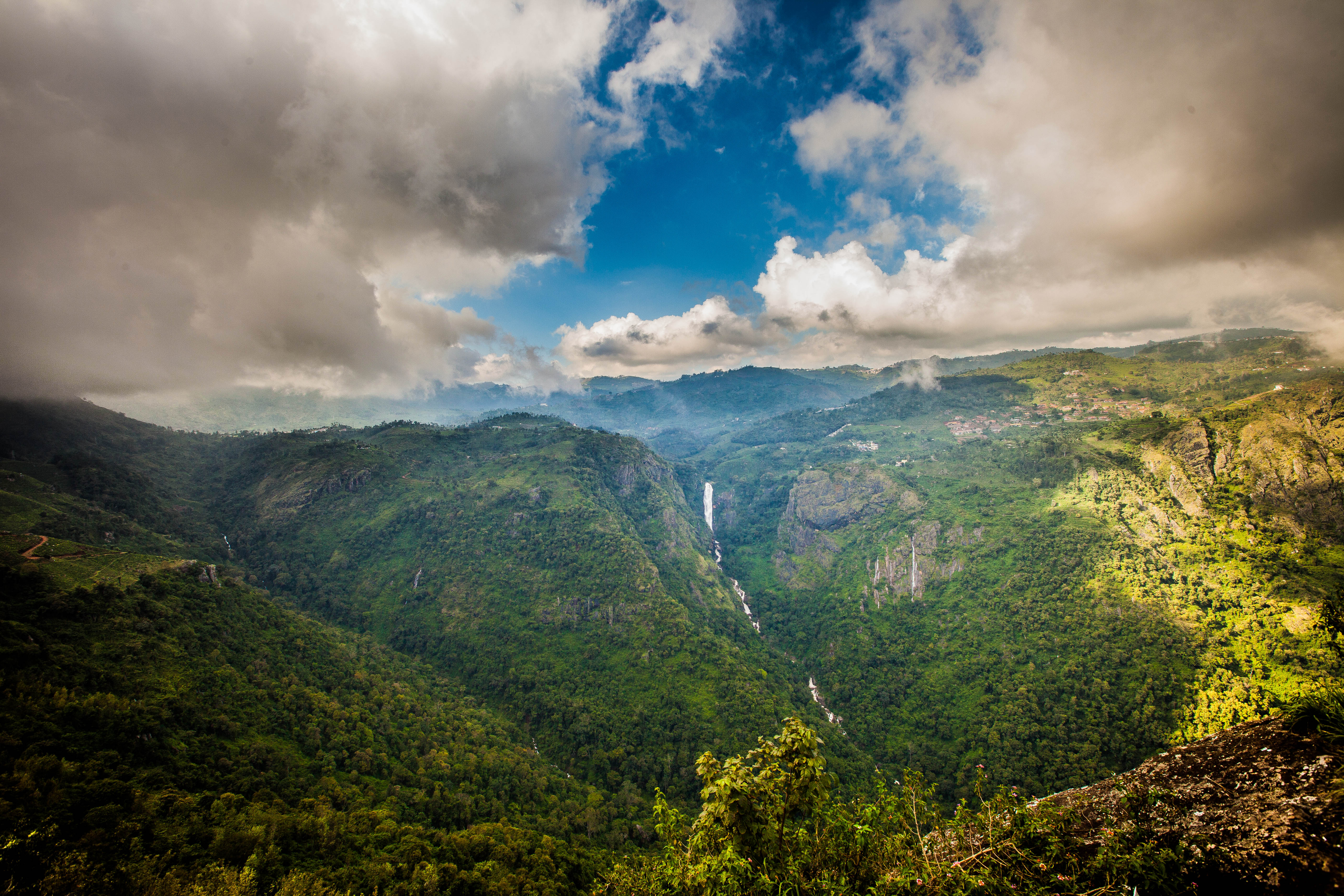
Surroundings

Catherine Falls is a double-cascaded waterfall located in Kotagiri, The Nilgiris District, in the Indian state of Tamil Nadu. It is a major tourist spot, located on the Mettupalayam road branching off at Aravenu. The upper fall drops to the floor, and is the second-highest in the Nilgiri Mountains. The waters from the upper stream of the Kallar River are crossed by the Mettupalayam-Ooty road beyond the mountains in the southwest. The combined height of both falls is about 76 metres (250 ft).

It has been generally claimed that Catherine Falls is named after the wife of M.D. Cockburn, who is said to have introduced coffee plantations to Kotagiri, however the name St. Catherine's Falls was in use even in 1852 while Catherine Jane Cockburn née Lascelles died in 1879. The native name of Catherine Falls is Geddhehaada Halla, meaning "Foothills Dale River". The entire waterfall can clearly be seen from the top of Dolphin's Nose. It is also possible to take a road to the top of the falls.

== See also ==
- List of waterfalls
- List of waterfalls in India
- Kotagiri
- Kodanad View Point
- Rangaswamy Peak and Pillar
