= Lamb's Rock =

Coordinates: 11°21′7.39″N 76°50′18.63″E

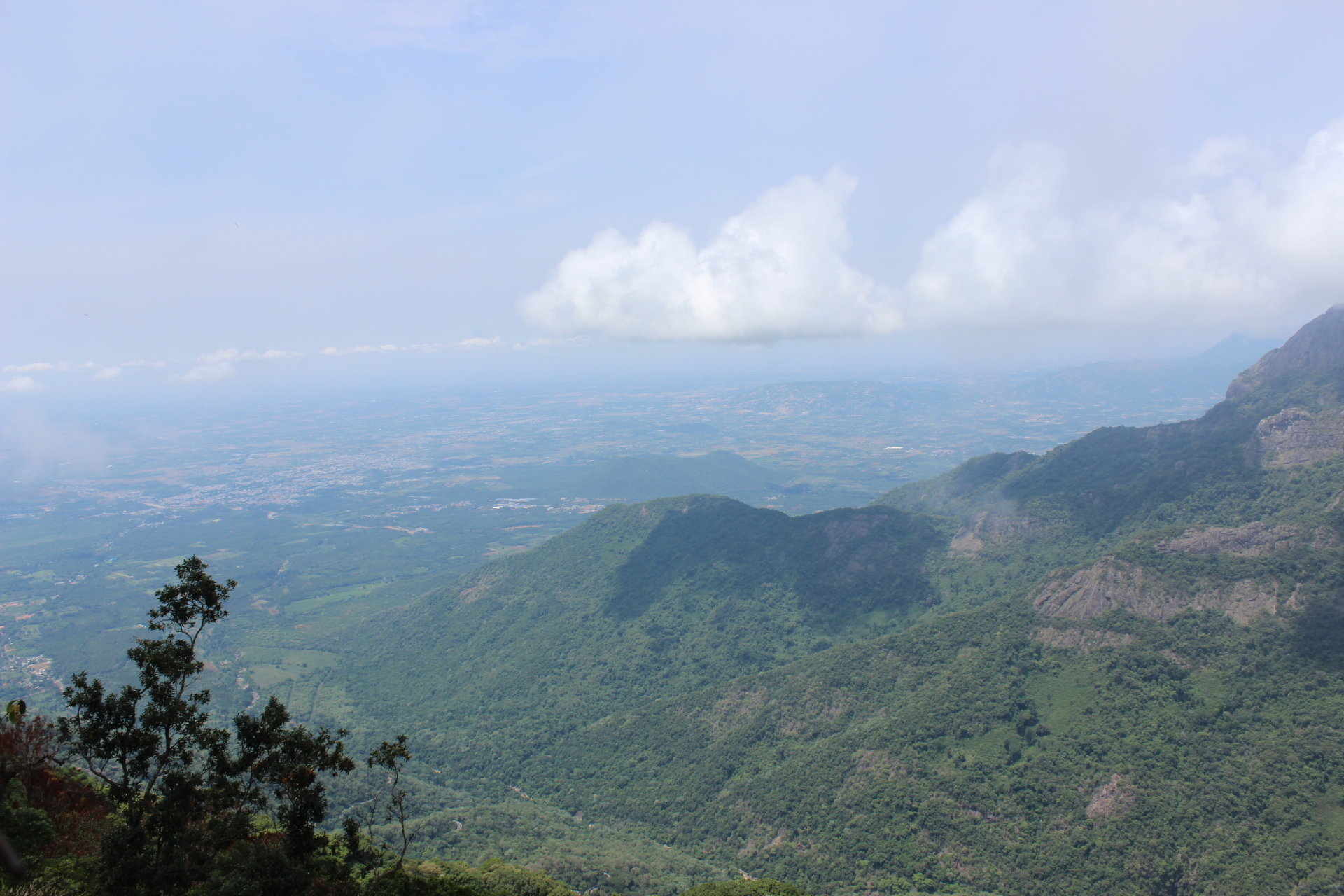
View from Lamb's Rock

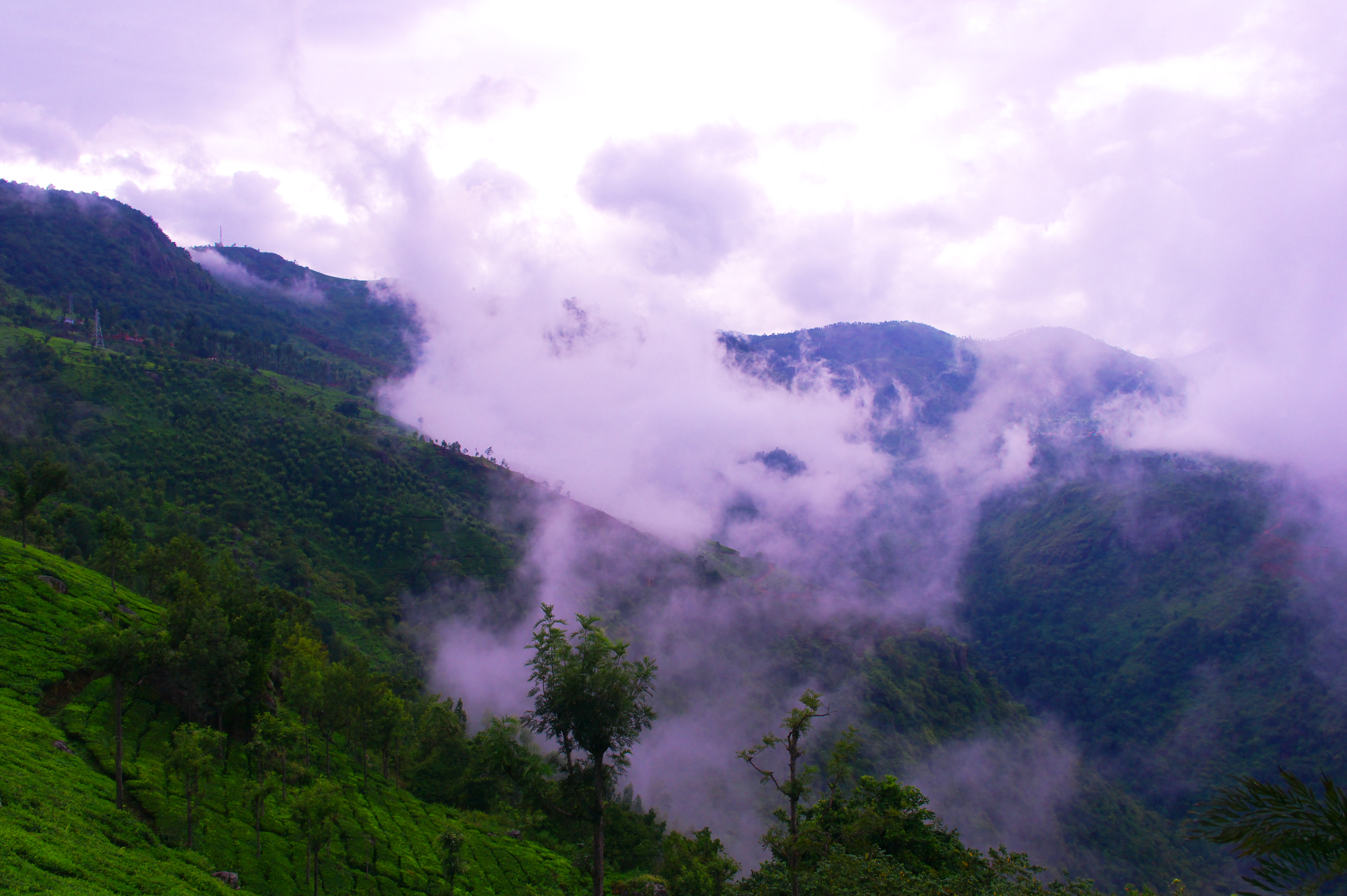
View from Lamb's Rock

Lamb's Rock is a tourist spot in Coonoor, Tamil Nadu, India, on the slopes of the Nilgiri Hills. It is located at a distance of 8 kilometers from Coonoor. It has a view of the Coimbatore plains, tea estates and coffee estates.
