= Hullathy =

Gram Panchayat and village in Tamil Nadu, India

Hullathy Gram Panchayat Hullathi Gram Panchayat
- Gram Panchayat
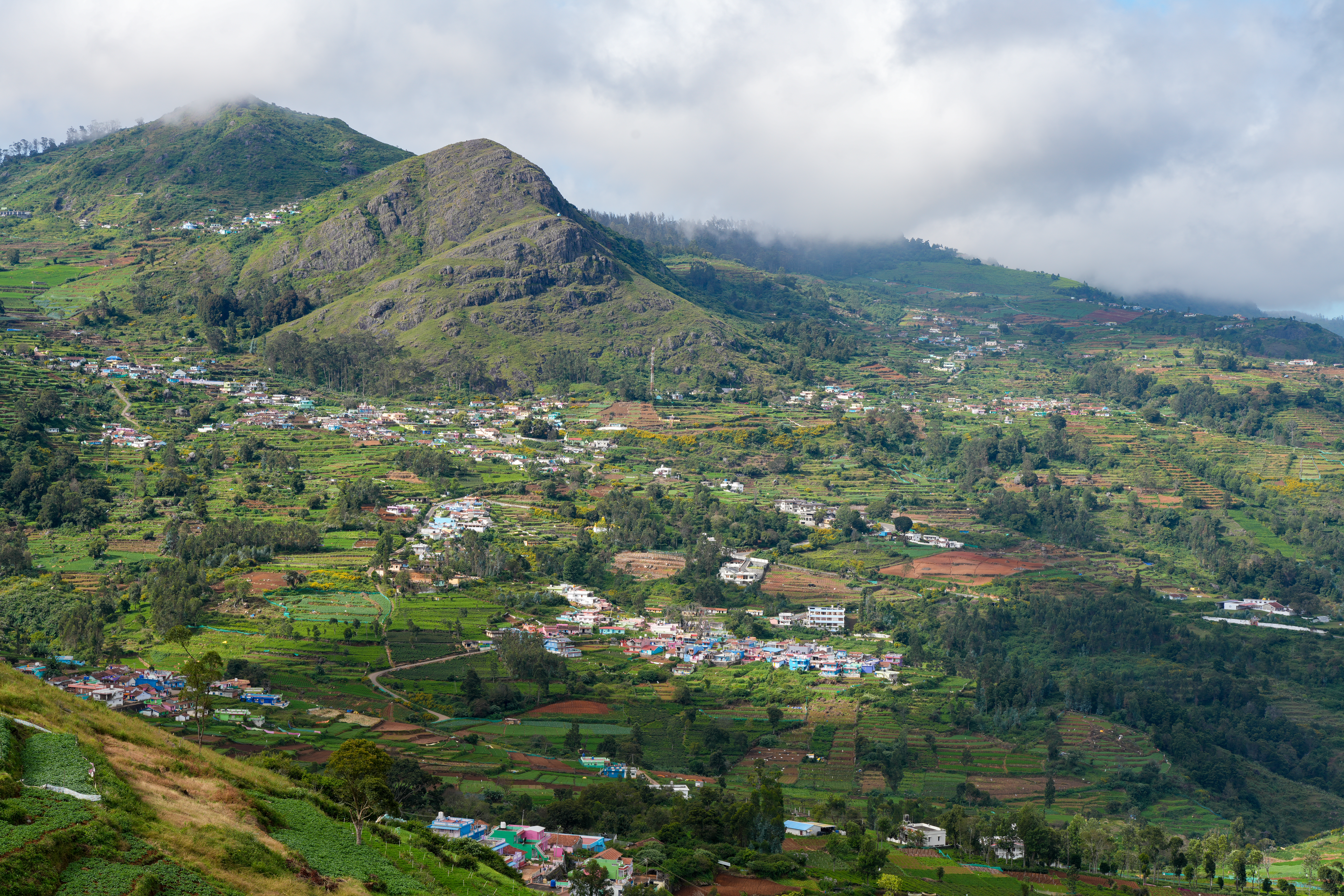
- Villages in west part of Hullathy Gram Panchayat

- Location within Tamil Nadu
- Coordinates: 11.4772108°N 76.6959024°E
- Country: India
- State: Tamil Nadu

Area
  - Total: 27.29 km^{2} (10.54 sq mi)

Population (2011)
  - Total: 9,187
  - Density: 336.6/km^{2} (871.9/sq mi)

Languages
- Time zone: UTC+5:30 (IST)
- Postal Index Number: 643007
- Vehicle registration: TN-43
- Website: https://nilgiris.nic.in/

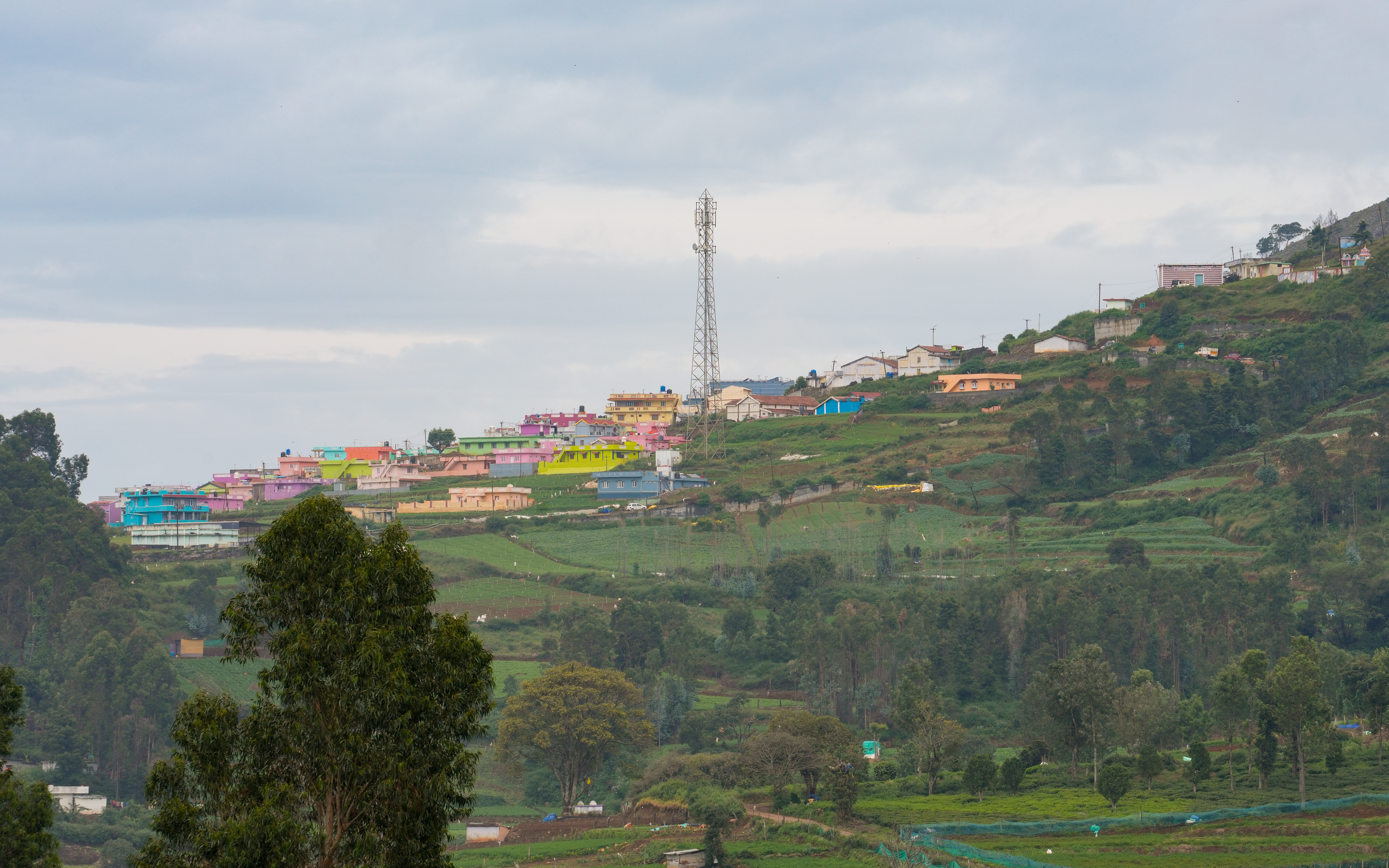
Hullathy village from the southwest

Hullathy (also Hullathi) is a Gram Panchayat and village in the Nilgiris district, Tamil Nadu, India. The Gram Panchayat is responsible for a total of 32 villages with a population of 9,187, covering an area of 2,729.18 ha (6,744.0 acres). The villages are located on both sides of MDR 700 as it descends steeply down the Sigur Ghat from Ooty to Masinagudi.

== Description ==
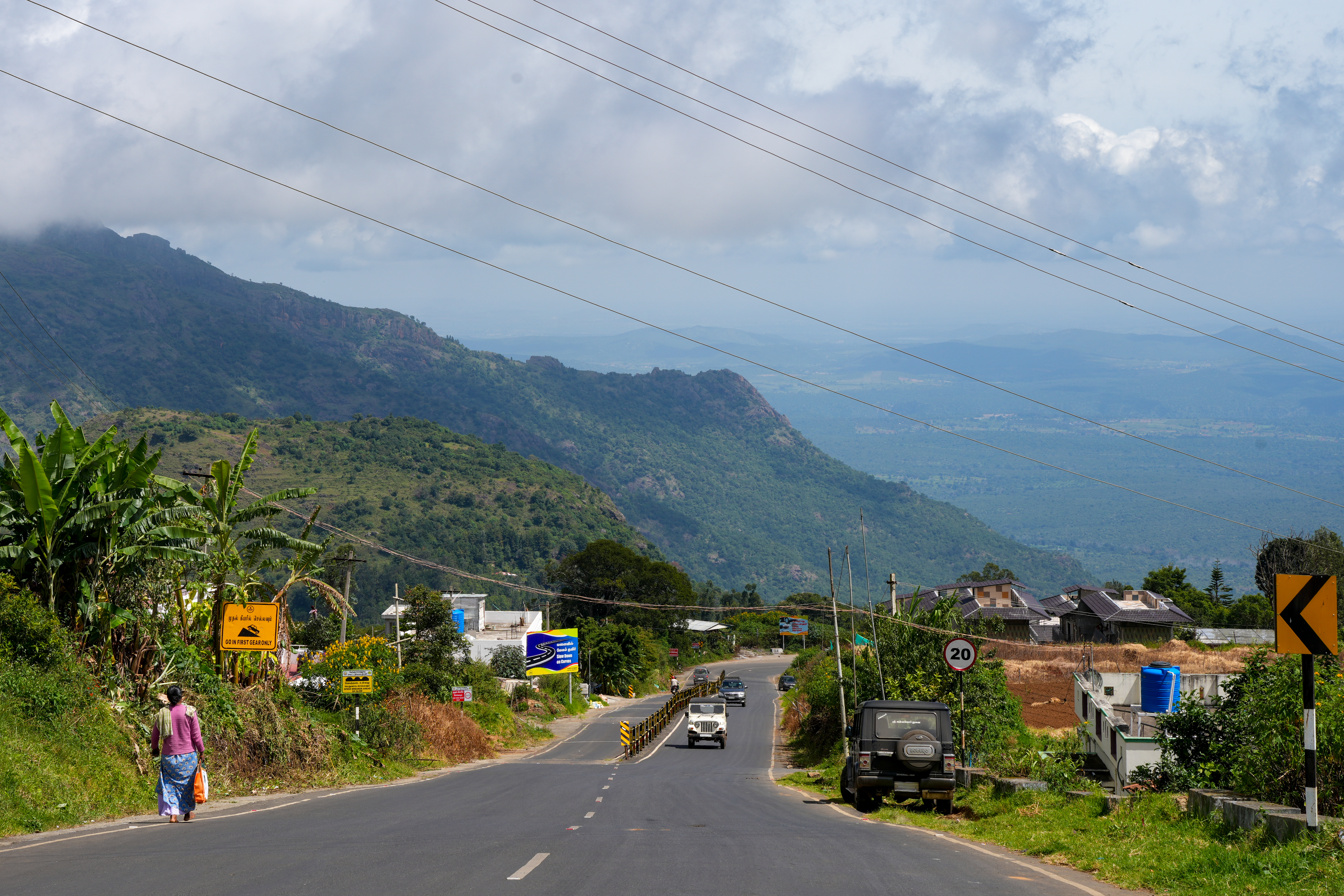
Steep Sigur Ghat road below Kalhatty

Hullathy Gram Panchayat is located in Udhagai taluk in the Nilgiris district of Tamil Nadu. It falls under the Udhagamandalam assembly constituency and the Nilgiris Lok Sabha constituency. The Hullathy panchayat covers 32 villages, including Hullathy village. According to the 2011 India census, the villages cover an area of 2,729.18 ha (6,744.0 acres). The villages are located on both sides of the Thalaikundah - Theppakadu Road (MDR 700) as it descends steeply down the Sigur Ghat from Ooty to Masinagudi.

== Demographics ==
The total population is 9,187 in 2,593 households. Among these 50.5% are female. 26.4% belong to scheduled castes and 10.3% to scheduled tribes. The literacy rate is 68%. In the Nilgiris District, Hindus comprise 86.1% of the rural population, with Muslims and Christians being 6.8% each.

== Governance ==
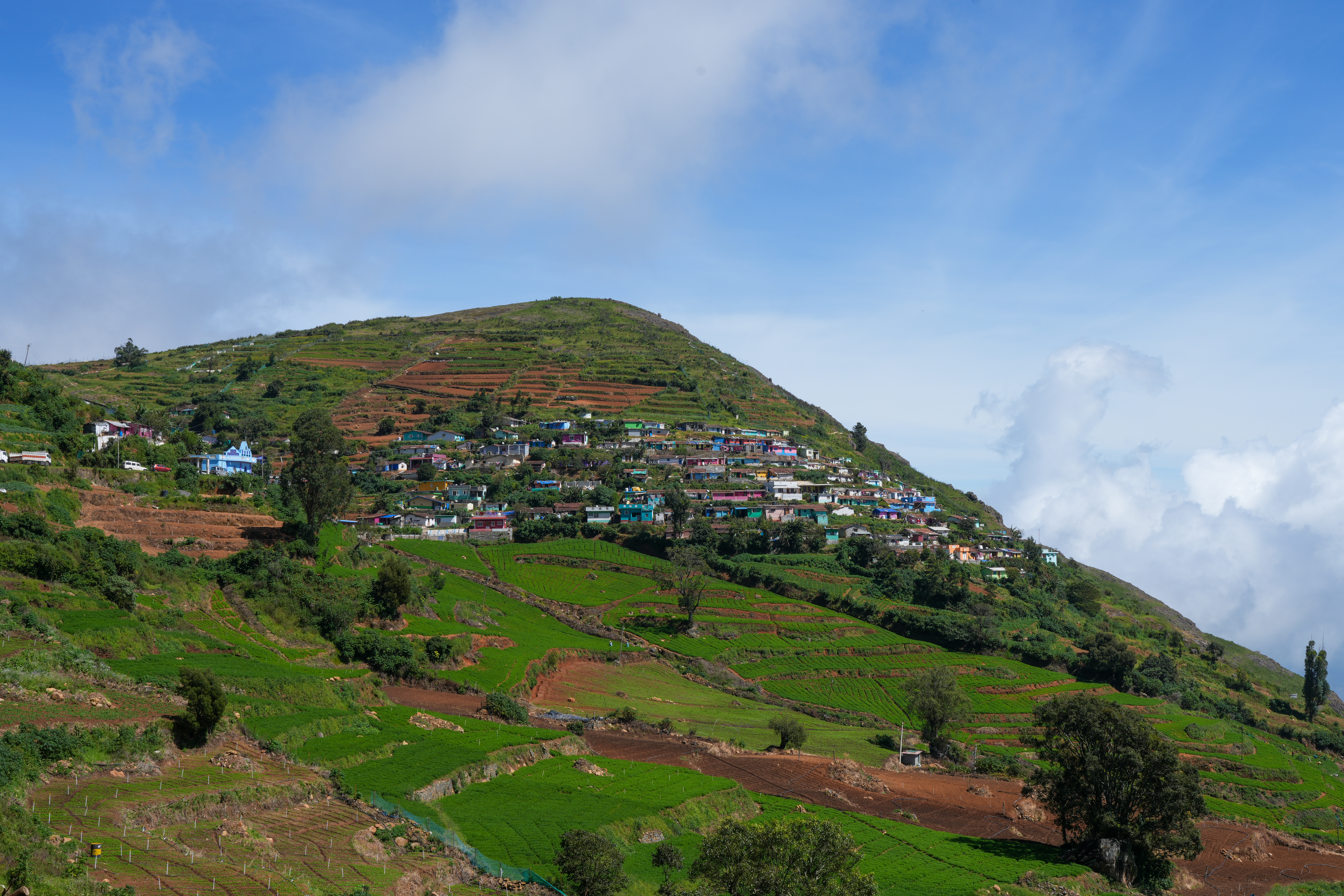
Alagarmalai from the south-east

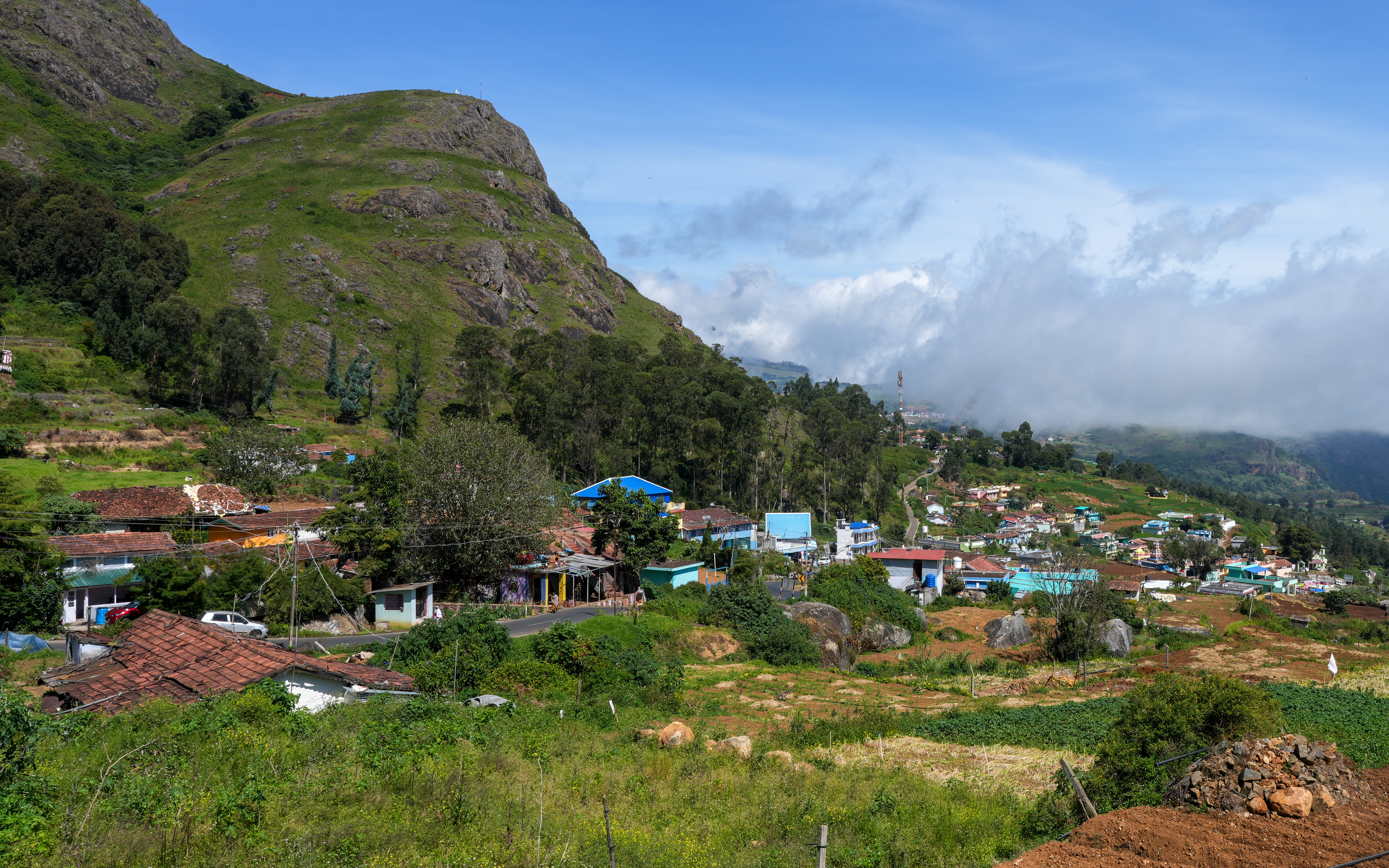
Kalhatty from the south

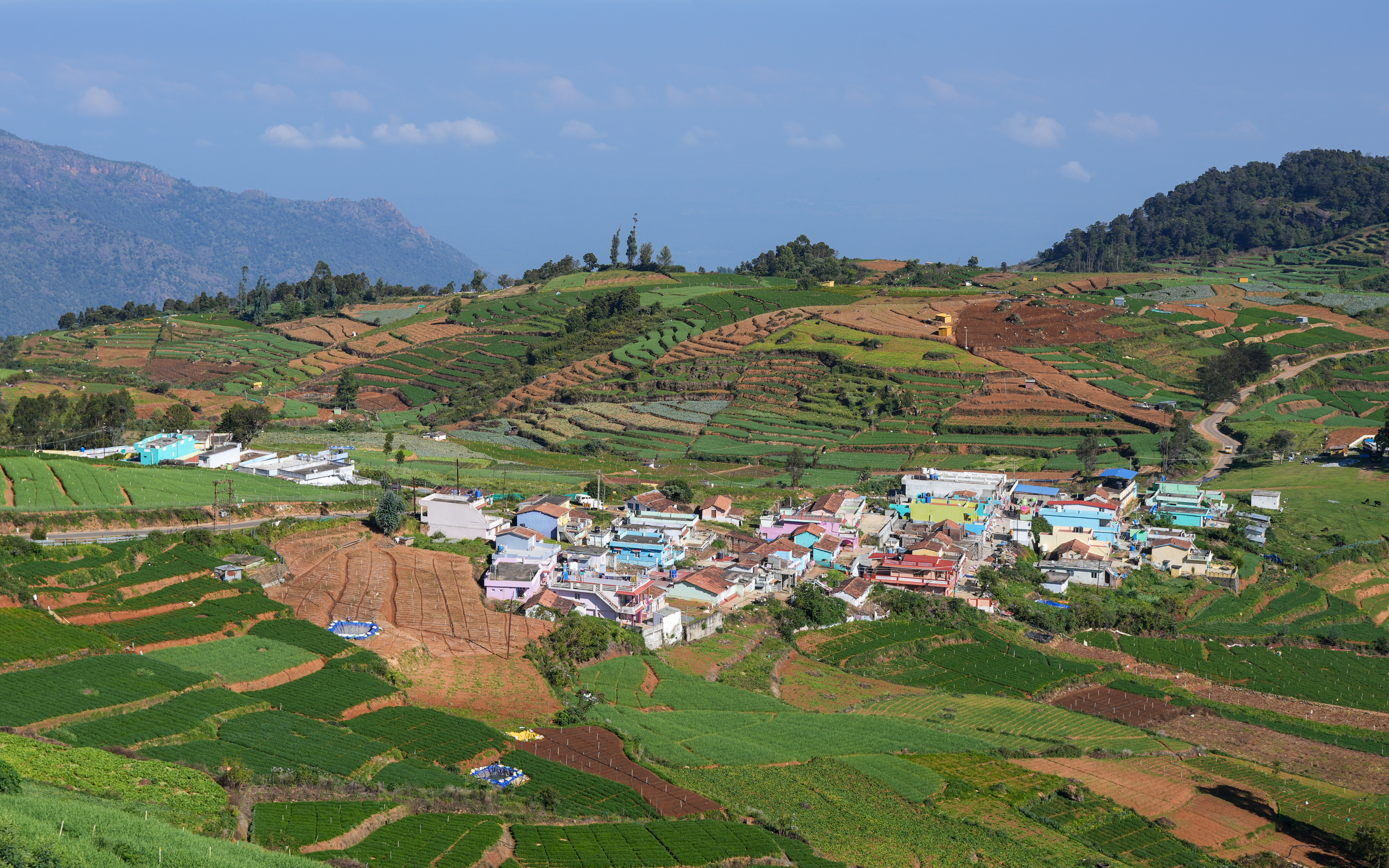
Looking down on Kavaratty

The Hullathy Gram Panchayat has a total of 12 wards and 12 Council members elected from these. The 32 villages in the Panchayat, listed in order of Habitation Code, are:

1. Alagarmalai
2. Ammanadu
3. Hullathy
4. Asaganthorai
5. Atthikkal
6. Begulamand
7. Bannimara
8. Bharathi Nagar
9. Bikkatty
10. Econy
11. Gandhi Nagar
12. Halkat Nagar
13. Kadasholai
14. Karapillu
15. Karimullimand
16. Kavaratty
17. Kembelai
18. Kil Kallatty
19. Kombuthookimand
20. Masikal
21. Mel Kallatty
22. Melur
23. Muthanadmand
24. Neethi
25. Sakthi Nagar
26. Sholada
27. Thalaikundha
28. Thattaneri
29. Annanagar
30. MGR Nagar
31. Indranagar
32. Alkadulease

== Amenities ==
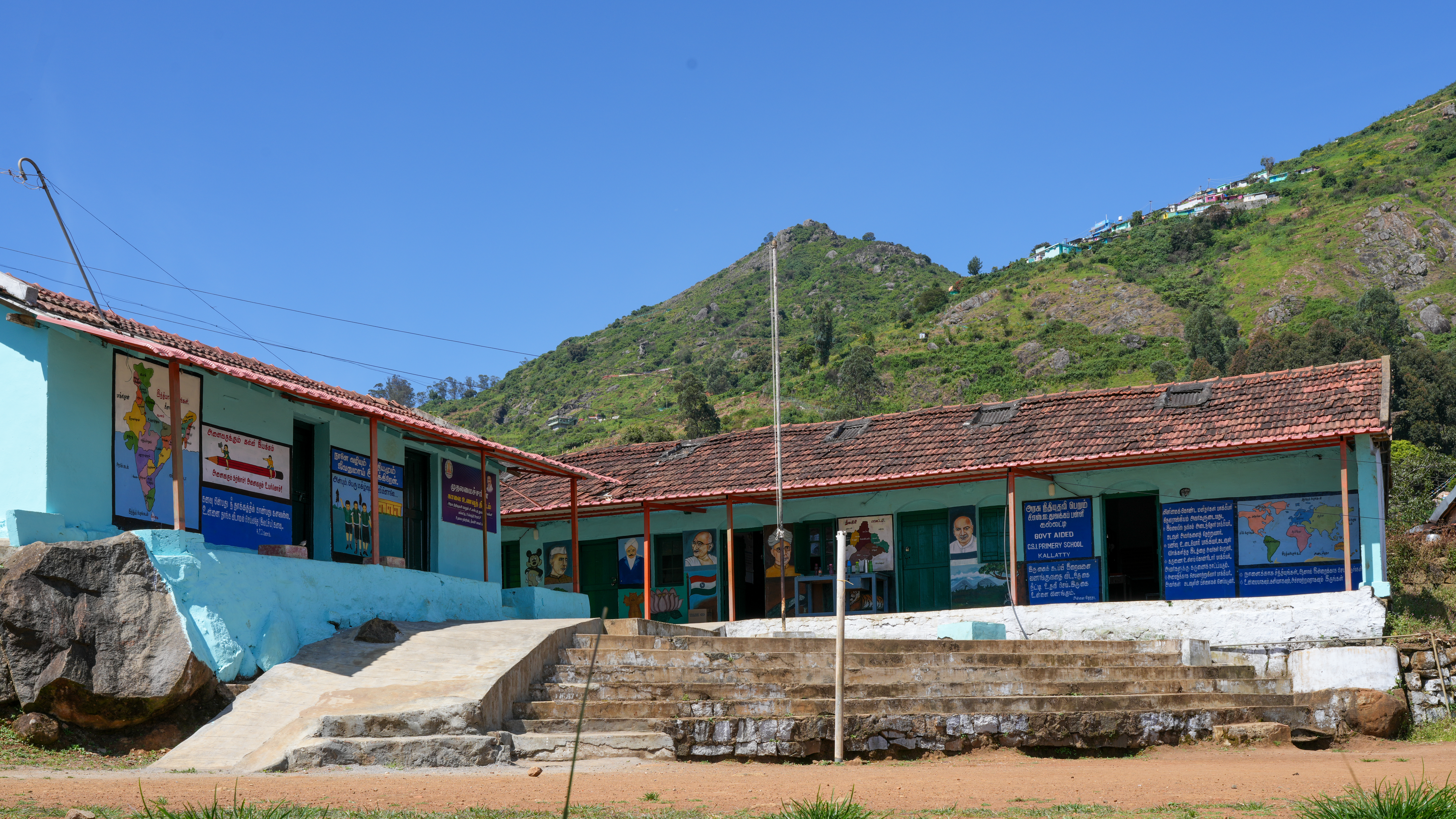
CSI Primary School, Kalhatty

The Hullathy villages have several primary and middle schools, and a secondary school. They have a primary health centre and several sub-centres and dispensaries. There is a private hospital, a few doctors and a pharmacy. Landline and mobile telephony, and electricity supply are available. There is an India Post Branch Office (B.O.) with pincode 643007.

== Fauna and flora ==
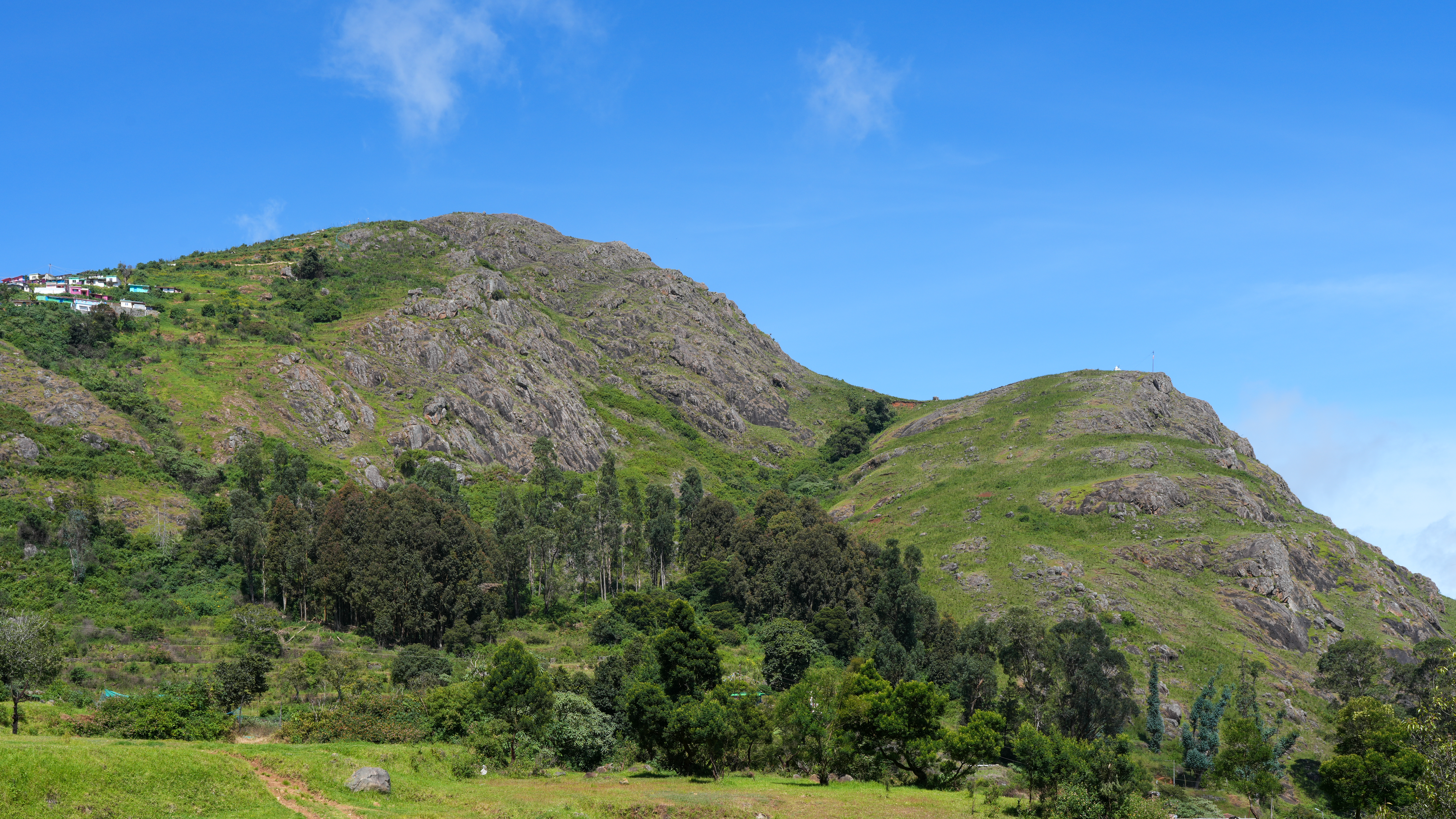
Forest between Kalhatty and Alagarmalai

As it is close to the Mudumalai Tiger Reserve, wild animals such as deer, wild buffalo and sambhar are found in this area.

== Economy ==
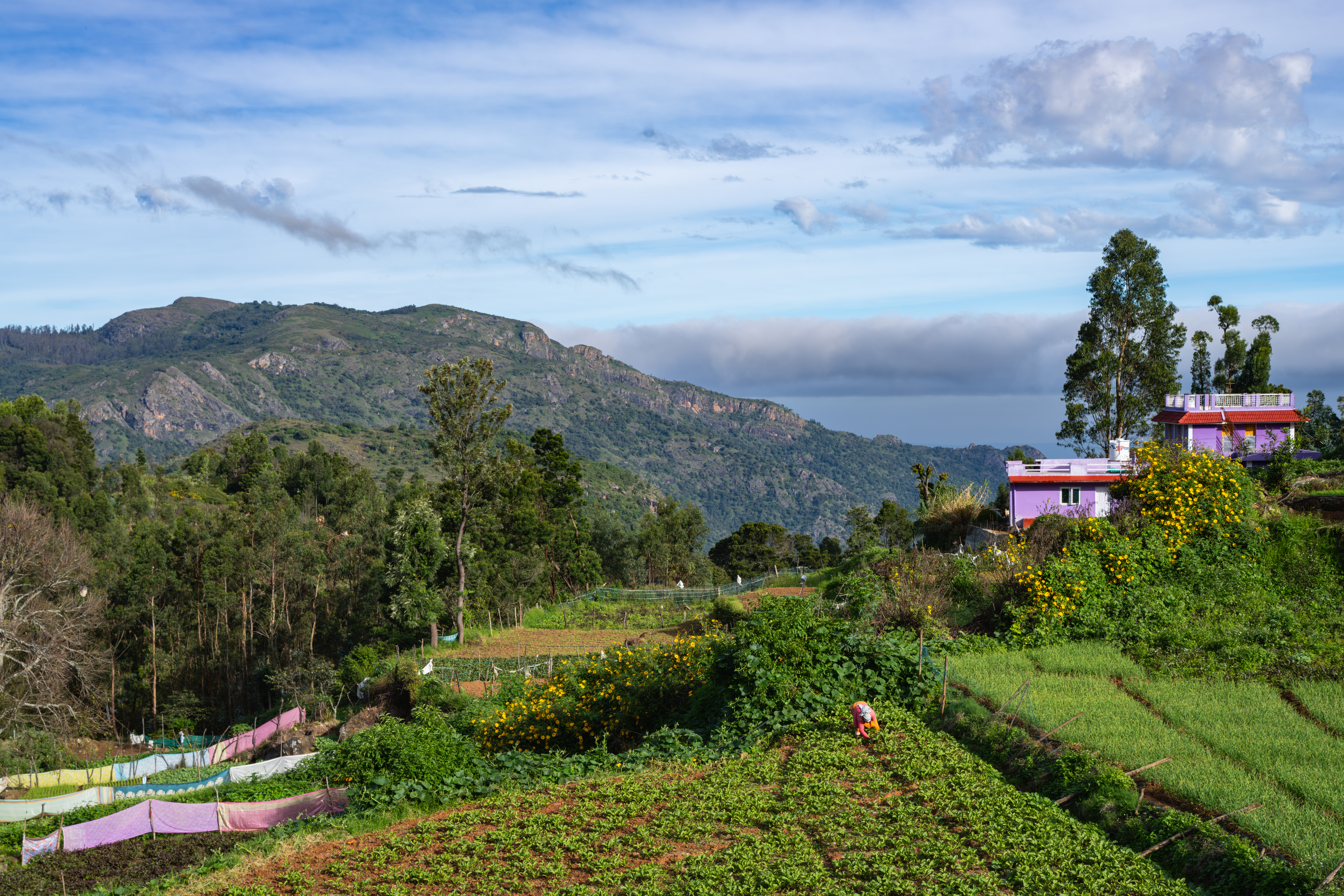
Radish and garlic fields, Econy

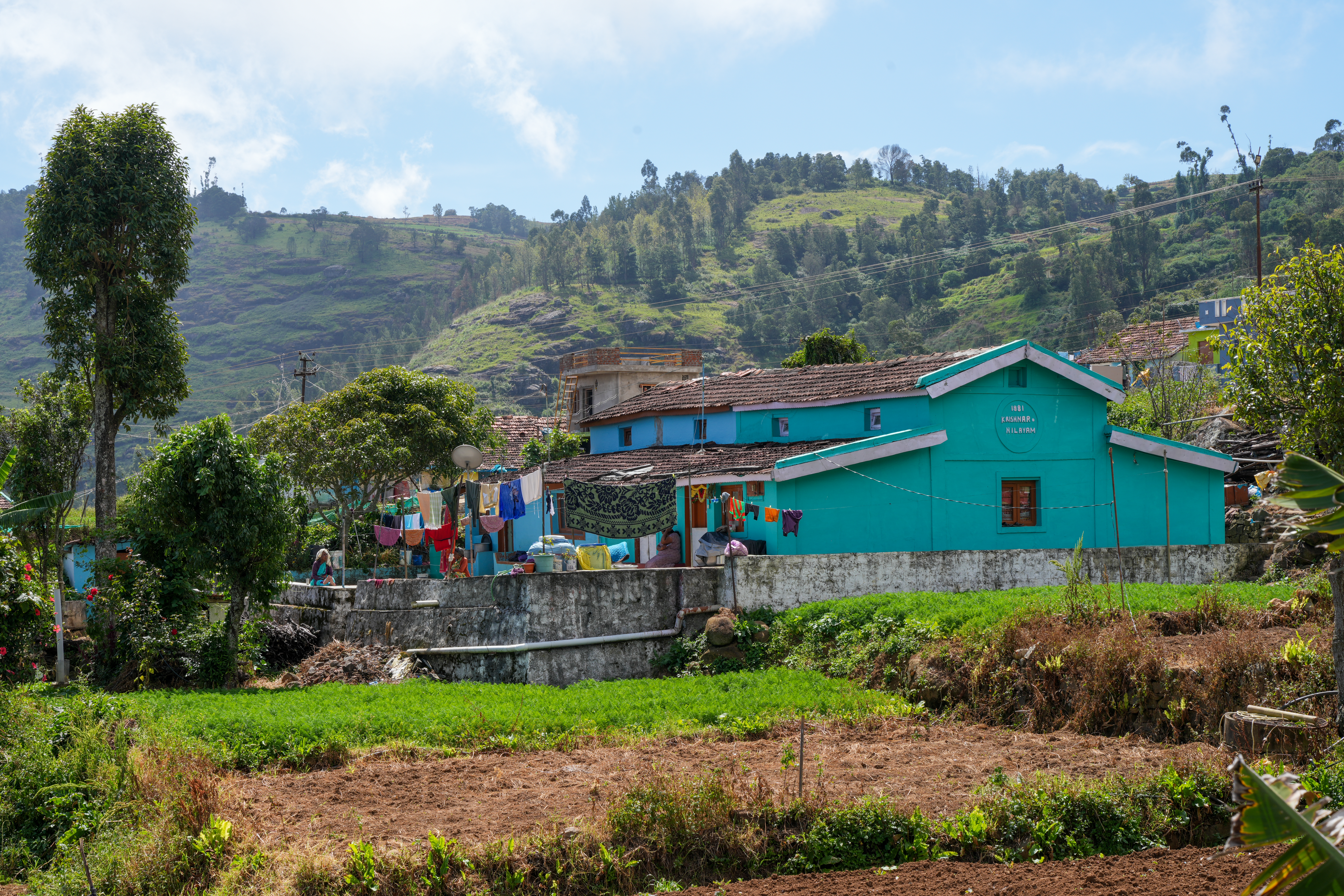
Vegetable fields and farm house, Bikkatty

The economy is largely agrarian. In 2011, 80% of the workers in the gram panchayat were engaged in agriculture. At that time, forests comprised 41% of the total panchayat area, 30% was cultivated and 4.2% was permanent grazing area. Tourism also provides jobs and income.

== Transport ==
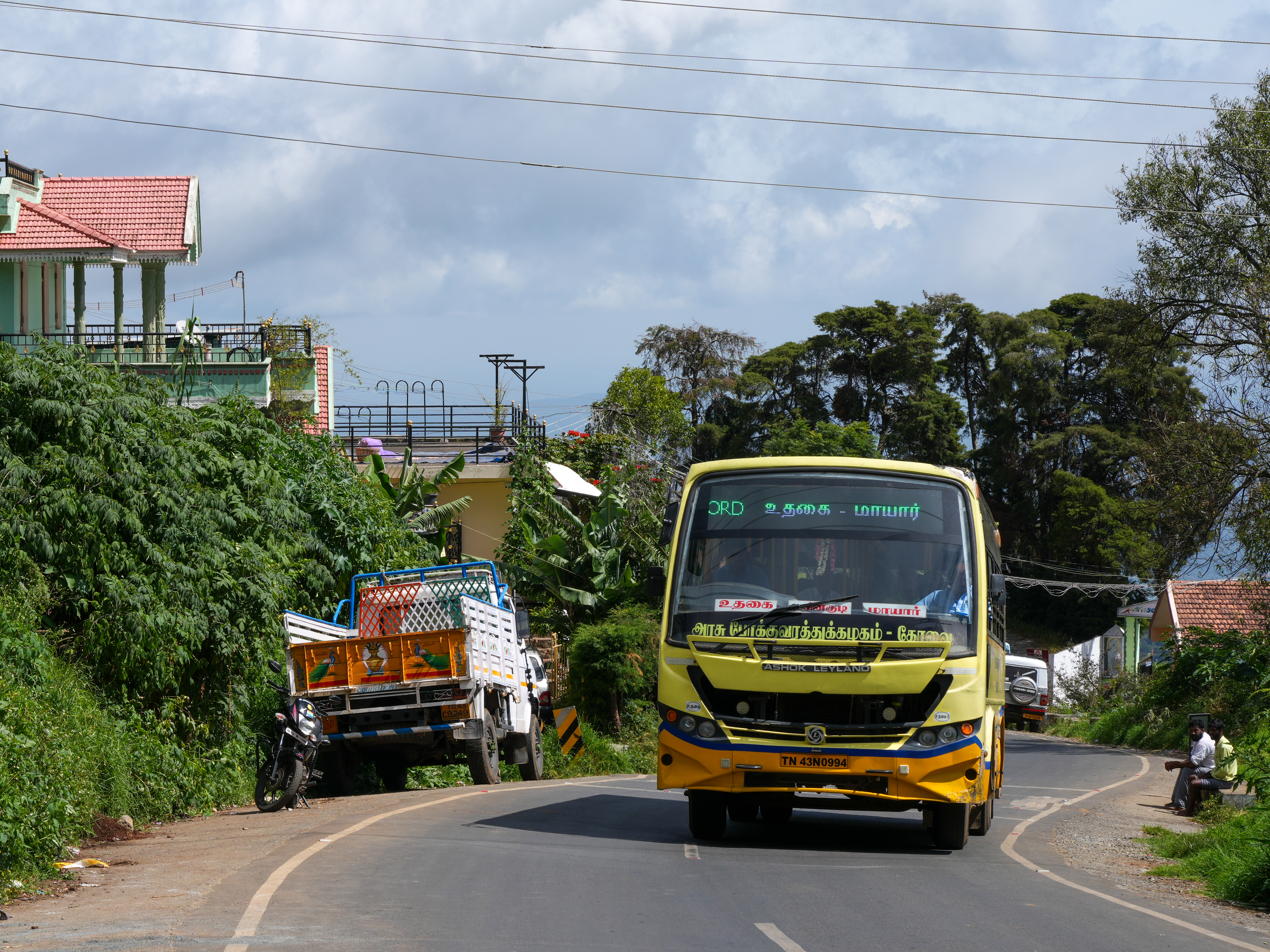
Moyar to Ooty bus in Kalhatty

Public and private buses serve the villages. Taxis and vans are available for hire.

== Tourism ==
The villages of Hullathy Gram Panchayat overlook the Mudumalai National Park. Kalhatty Falls is a popular tourist spot. It is rich in bird life. Wild animals may be seen coming to drink water. Tourists from Karnataka and Kerala drive up MDR 700 through these villages to reach the popular destination Ooty.
