= Kalhatti Falls (Ooty) =

Tourist spot near Ooty, Tamil Nadu, India

Coordinates: 11.47719°N 76.67980°E

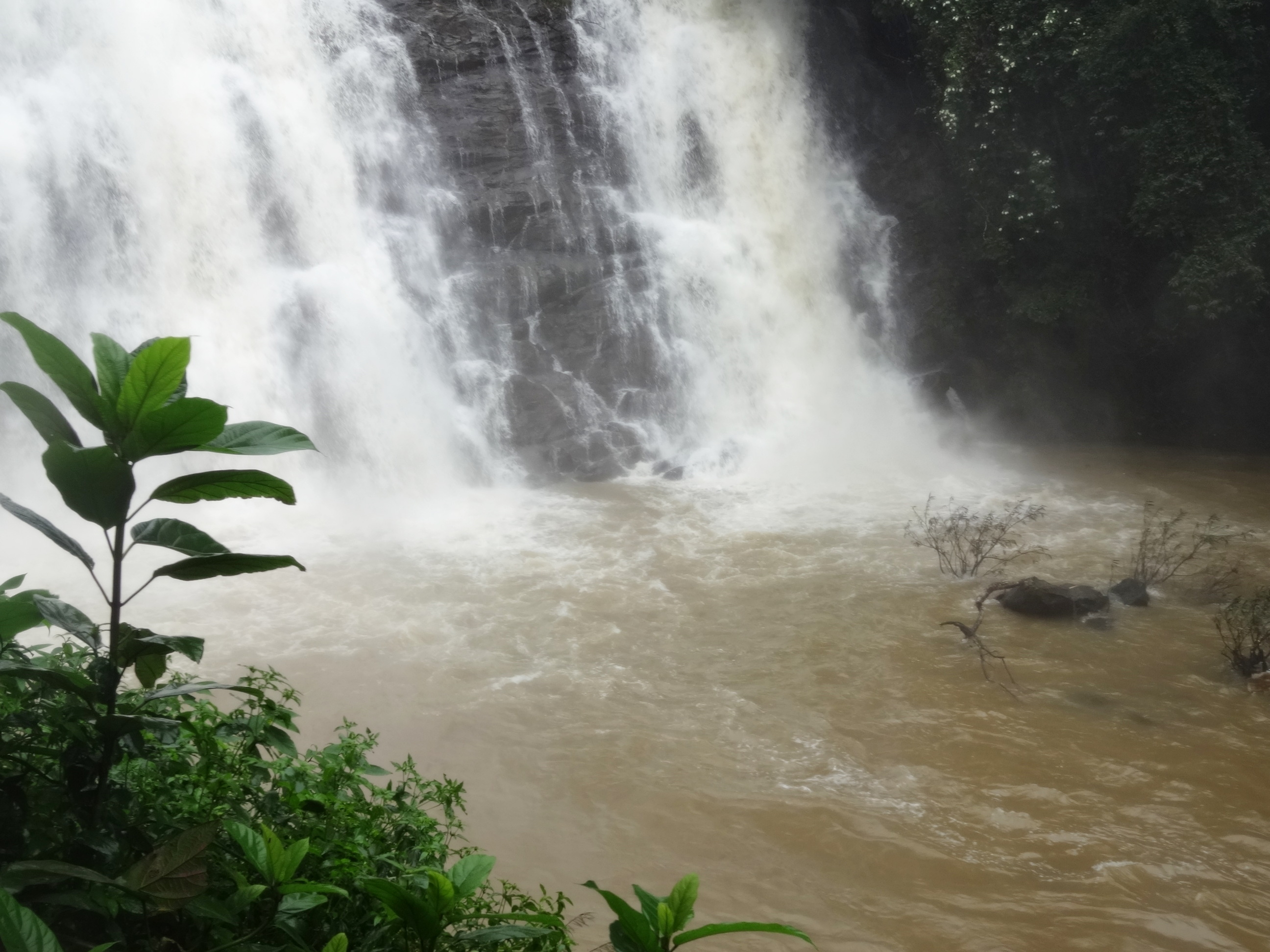
Kalhatti Falls

Kalhatti Falls also called as Bird Watcher's Falls is a tourist spot near Ooty, The Nilgiris, Tamil Nadu. These falls are about 13 km (8.1 mi) from Ooty, on the Ooty to Mysore Road or Sigur Ghat Road, It is situated at an elevation of about 1,600 m (5,200 ft) in the Sigur Plateau. This place is rich in bird life. Wild animals such as deer, wild buffalo and sambhar come to drink water. From Kalhatti village the falls can be reached by trekking for 3 km (1.9 mi).

== See also ==
- Nilgiri Mountains
- Catherine Falls
- Law's Falls
- Katary Falls
- Upper Bhavani
- Pykara
- Ooty Lake
- Kamaraj Sagar Dam
