= Mukkadahalli =

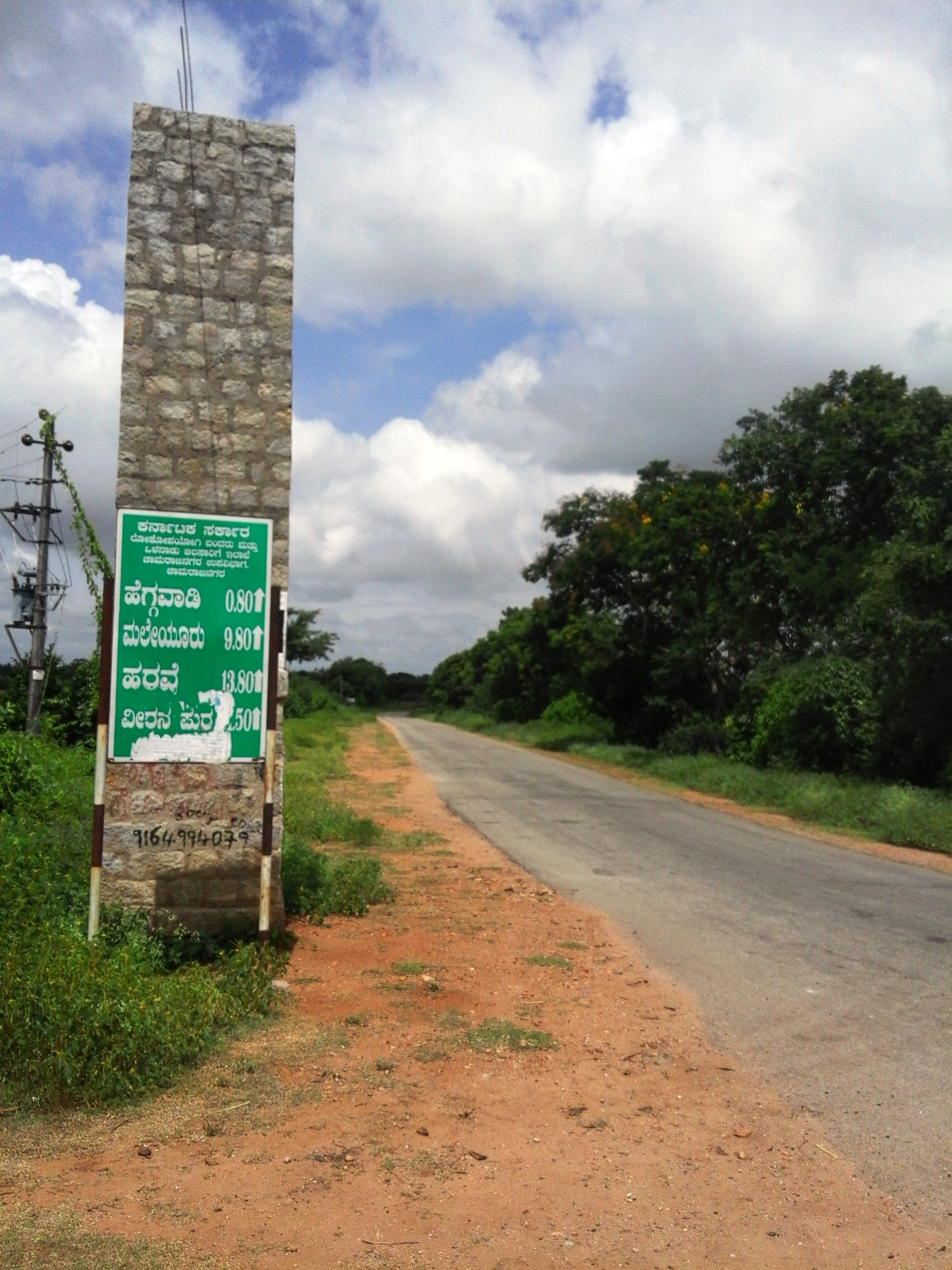
- Heeguuvadi Gate
- Interactive map of Mukkadahalli
- Coordinates: 11.971666°N 76.796404°E
- Country: India
- State: Karnataka
- District: Chamarajanagar
- Time zone: UTC+5:30 (IST)
- PIN: 571128
- Vehicle registration: KA

Mukkadahalli is a village in Chamarajanagar district of Karnataka state, India.

== Location ==
Mukkadahalli village is located on the highway from Chamarajanagar to Mysore. The nearest railway station is Konanur on Mysore–Chamarajanagar branch line. Only two slow trains stop here. The nearest major railway station is Mysore Junction.

== Economy ==
Most of the people in the village are employed in the agrarian sector. The village has a branch of Canara Bank.

== Post office ==
There is a post office in Mukkadahalli and the postal code is 571128.

== See also ==
- Konanur
- Konanur railway station
- Badanavalu
- Narasam Budhi
- Kavalande
- Badana Guppe
- Mariyala-Gangavadi Halt
- Badanaguppe
