= Badanaguppe =

Badanaguppe Moogooru, Kurburu
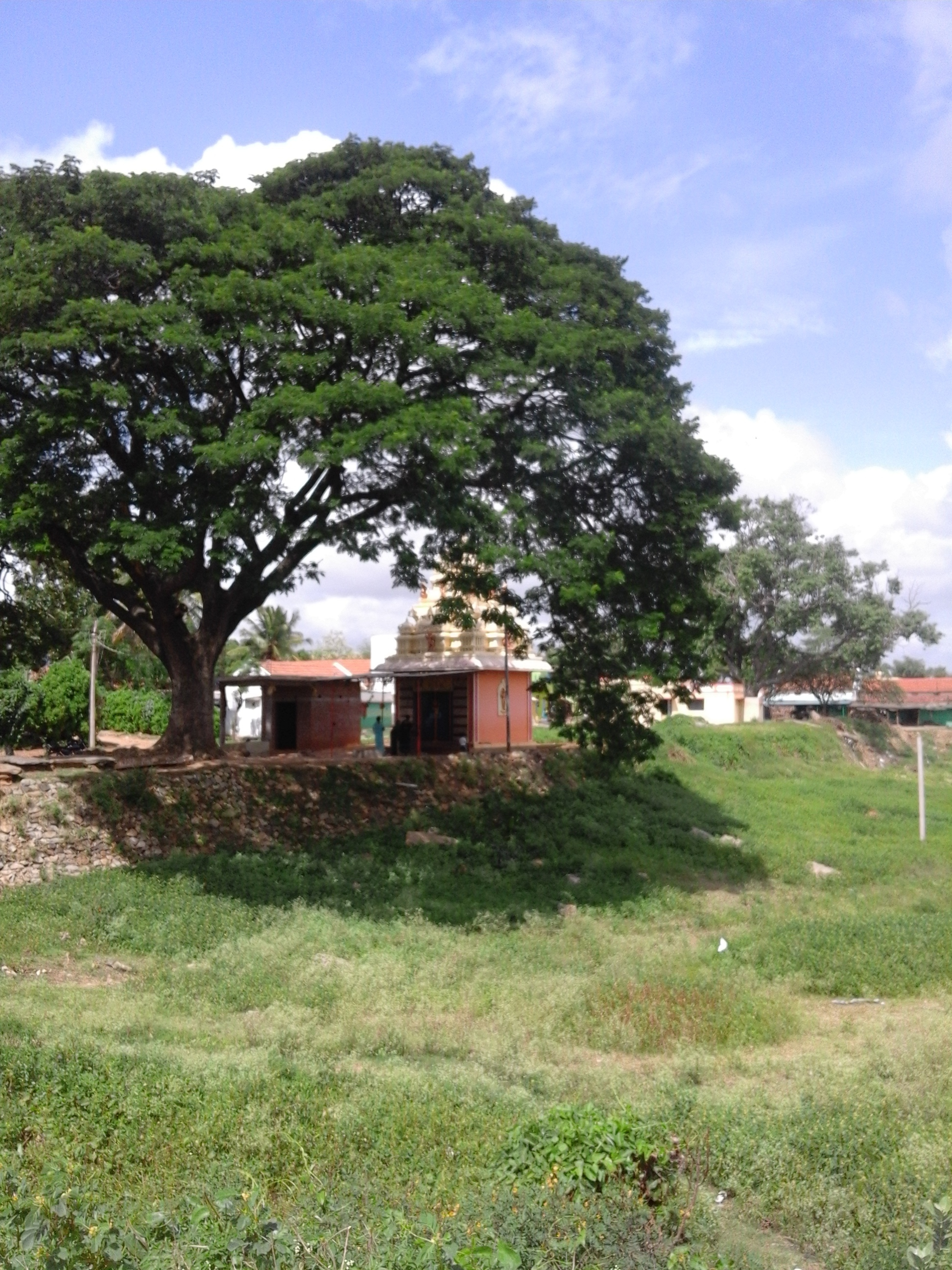
- Badanaguppe Temple
- Interactive map of Badanaguppe
- Coordinates: 11.983215°N 76.877861°E
- Country: India
- State: Karnataka
- District: Chamarajanagar
- Time zone: UTC+05:30 (IST)
- PIN: 571313

Badanaguppe is a village in Chamarajanagar district of Karnataka state, India.

== Location ==
Badanaguppe is located 11 km from Chamarajanagar town and 157 km from Bangalore, on the highway between Chamarajanagar and Nanjangud town.

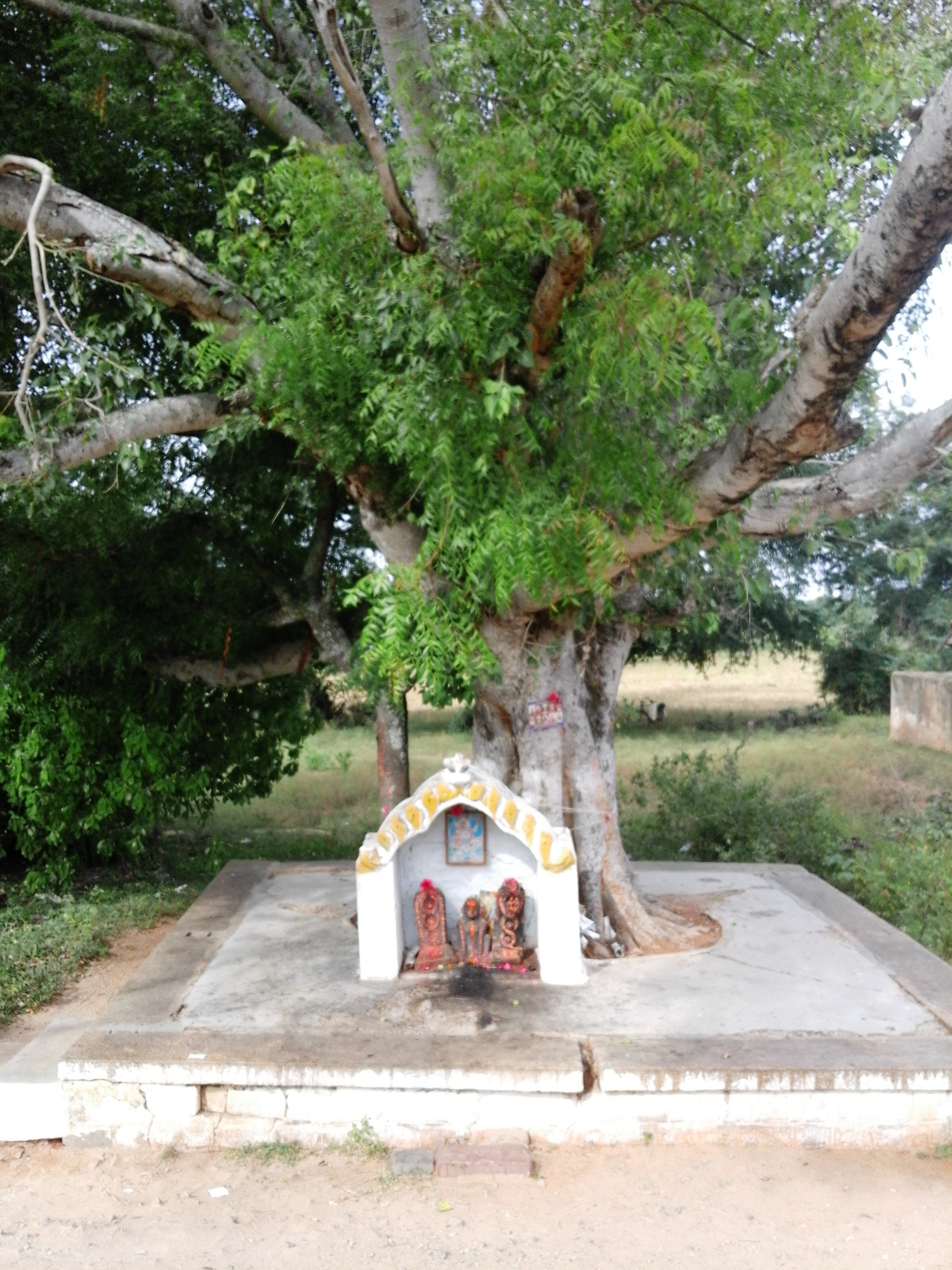
A temple on Badanaguppe railway station road

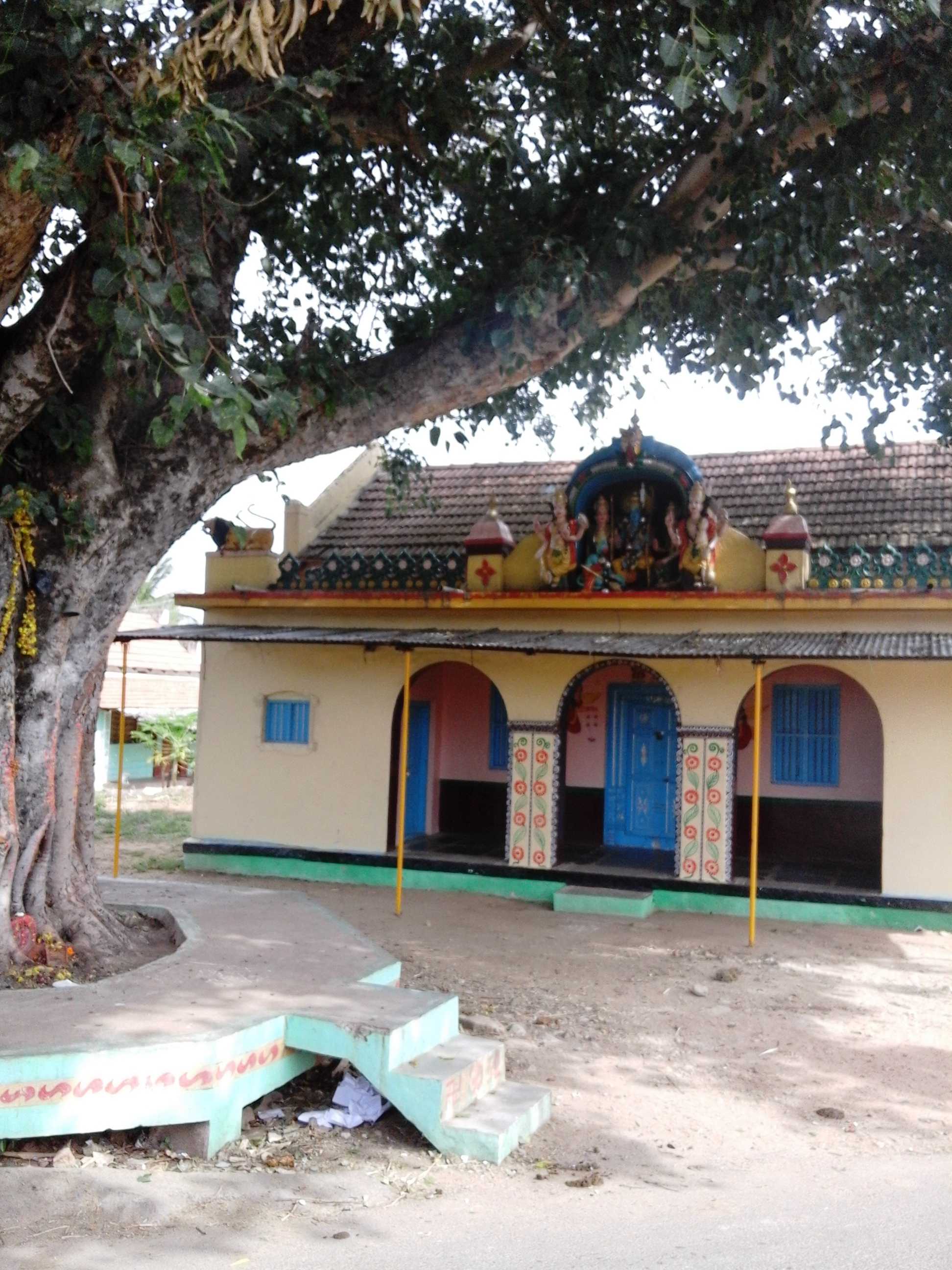
Rama Mandira Devasthana

== Economy ==
The people of the village are completely agrarian in their occupation. There is a branch of Canara Bank in the village. The provincial government has started a ₹400 crore (US$42 million) project on 1,595 acres of land called Badanaguppe-Kellamballi Industrial Estate which will include sectors like automobile, food processing, textiles, leather, granite and agriculture related industries.

== Tourist attractions ==
- Panyada Hundi temple, Badanaguppe.

== Post office ==
There is a post office at Badanaguppe and the pin code is 571313.

== Nearby places ==
Nanjedevanapura (8 km), Mukkadahalli (9 km), Madapura (10 km), Harave (10 km), Kuderu (10 km) are the nearby villages to Badanaguppe.

== Demographics ==
3,498 people live in Badanaguppe and there are 717 houses in the village. The area of the village is 1,139 hectares.

== Transportation ==
The village is served by Badanaguppe railway station, and Konanur railway station is also nearby. The village is on the highway from Chamarajanagar to Mysore.

== Image gallery ==
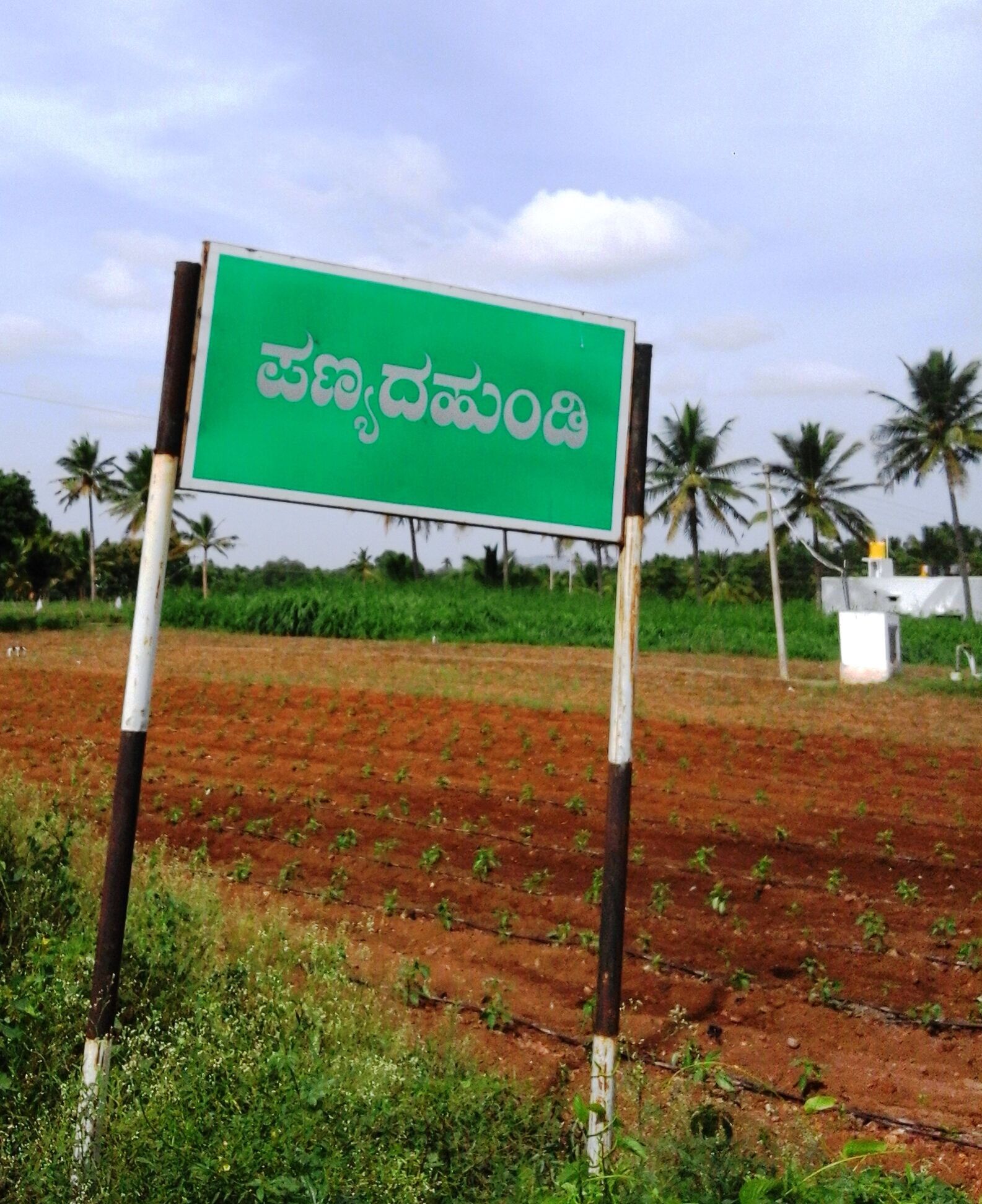
Pannethundi village

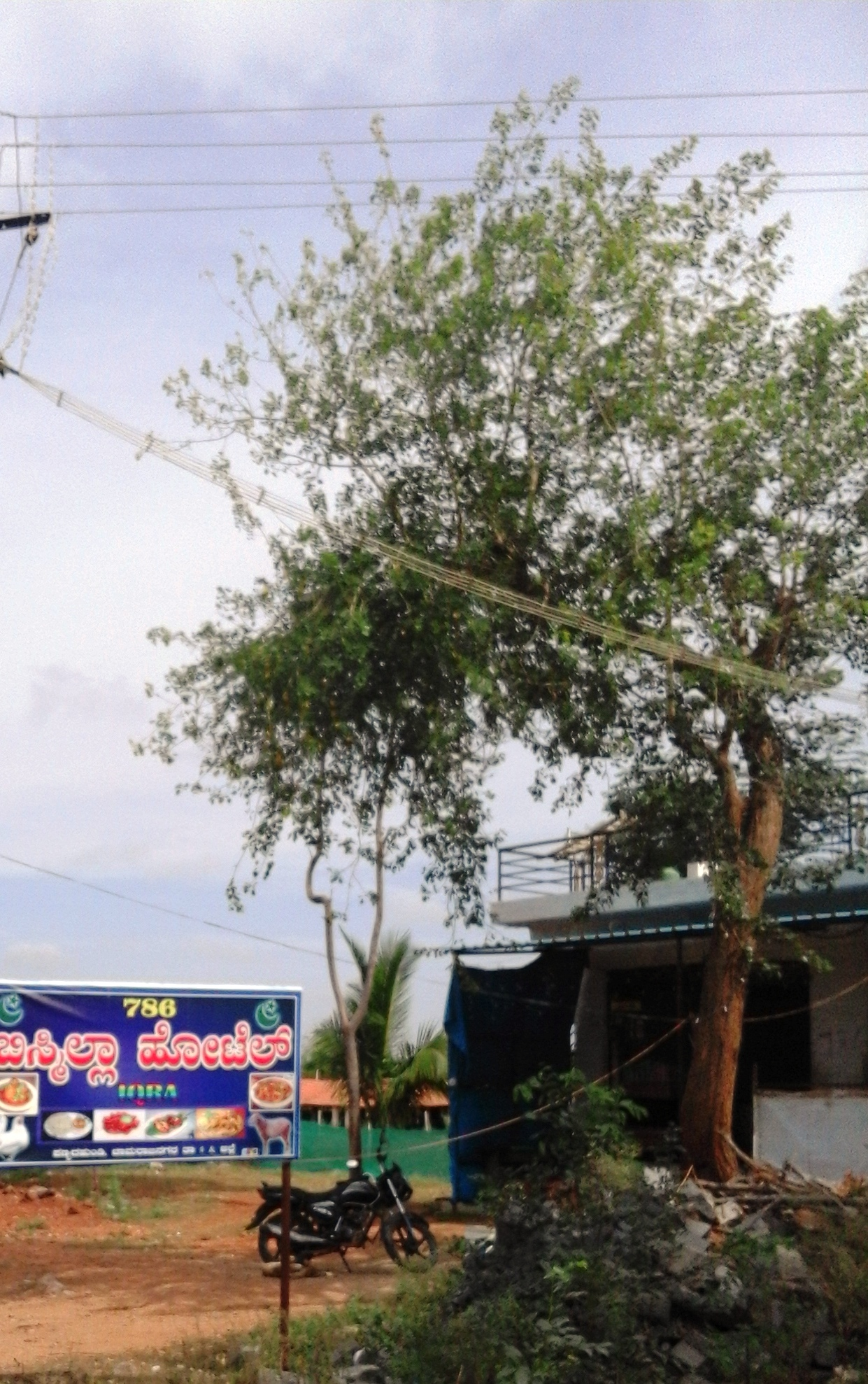
Iqra restaurant

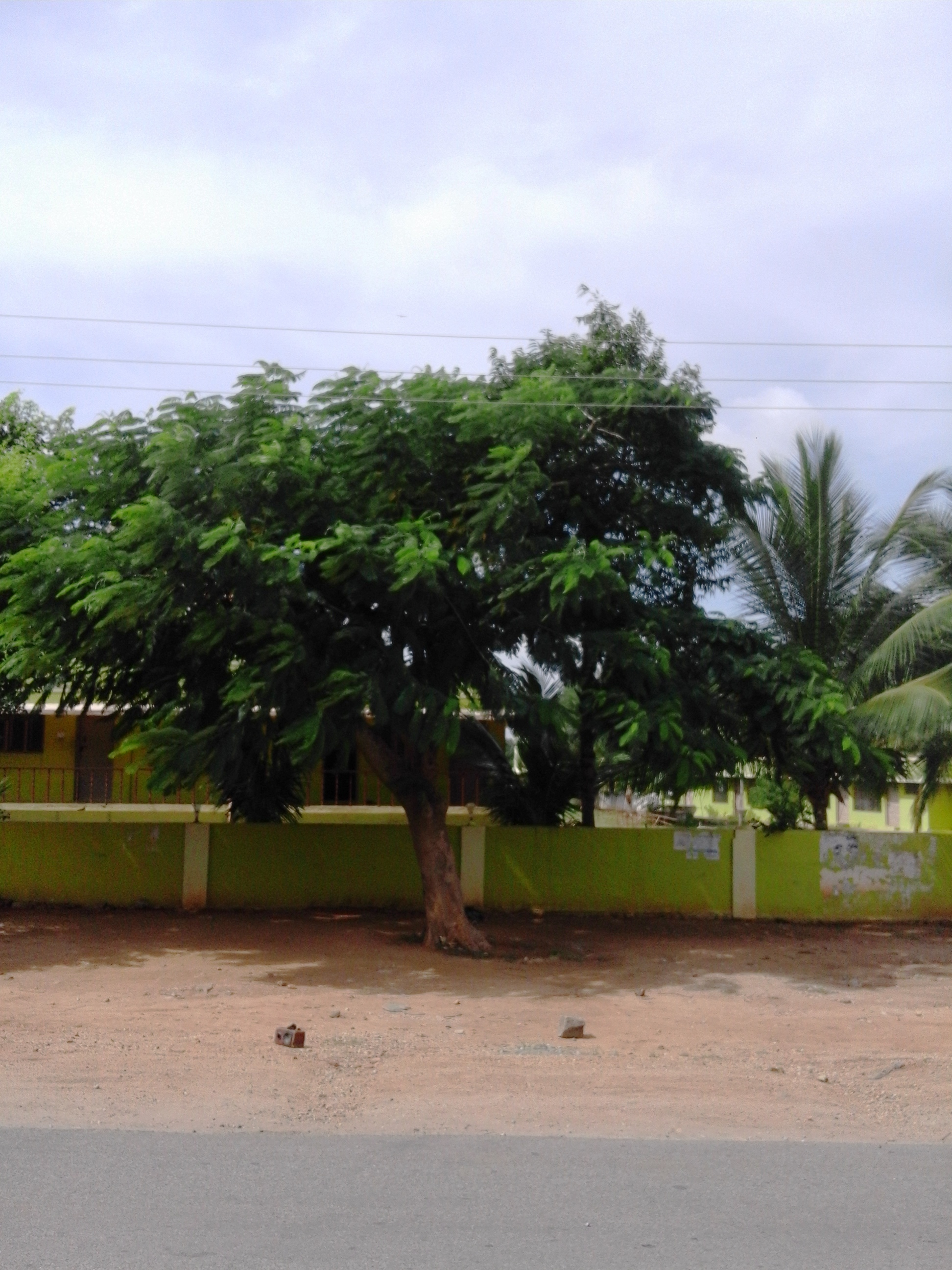
Gururajbhavana Choultry

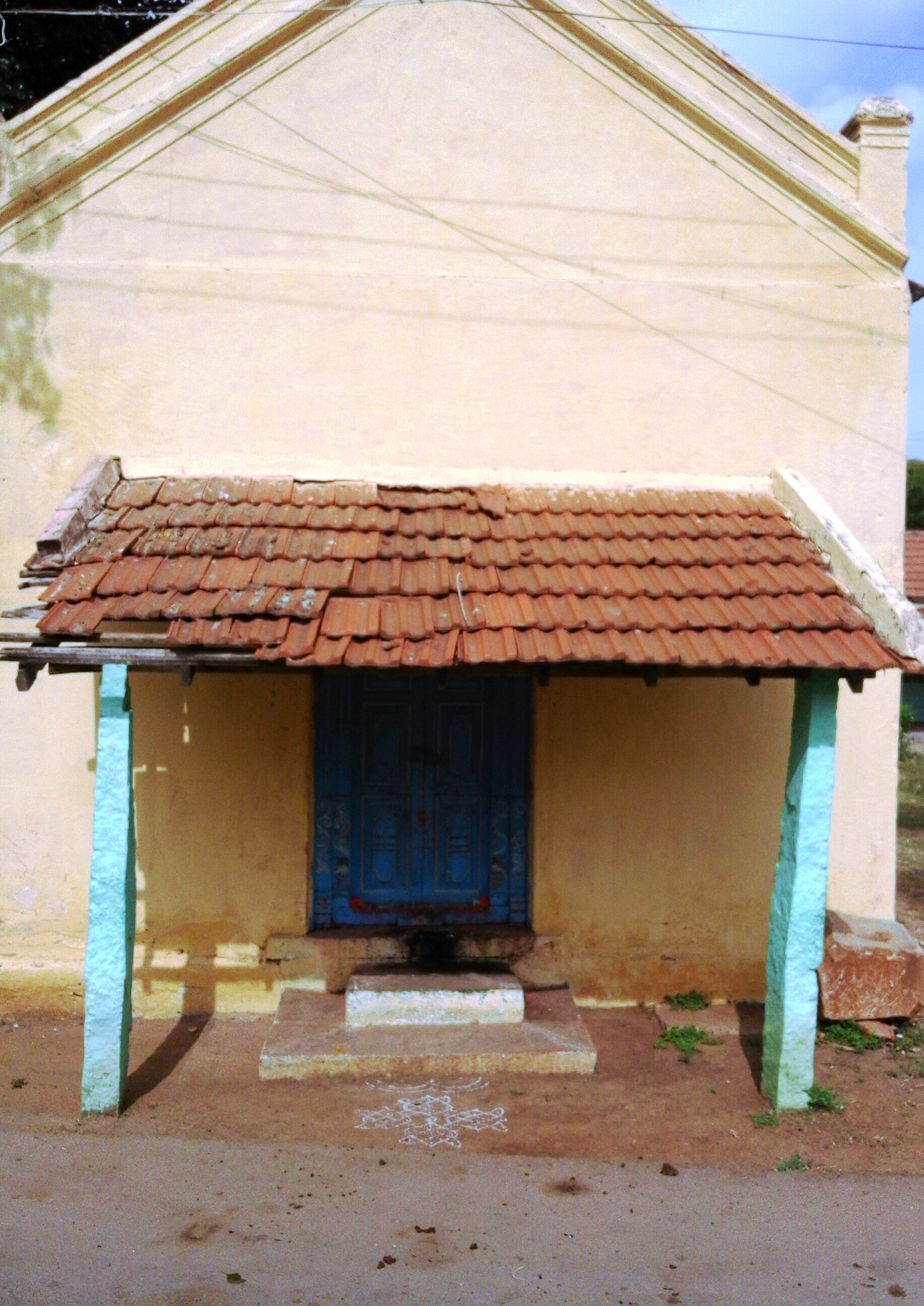
Pannethundi temple

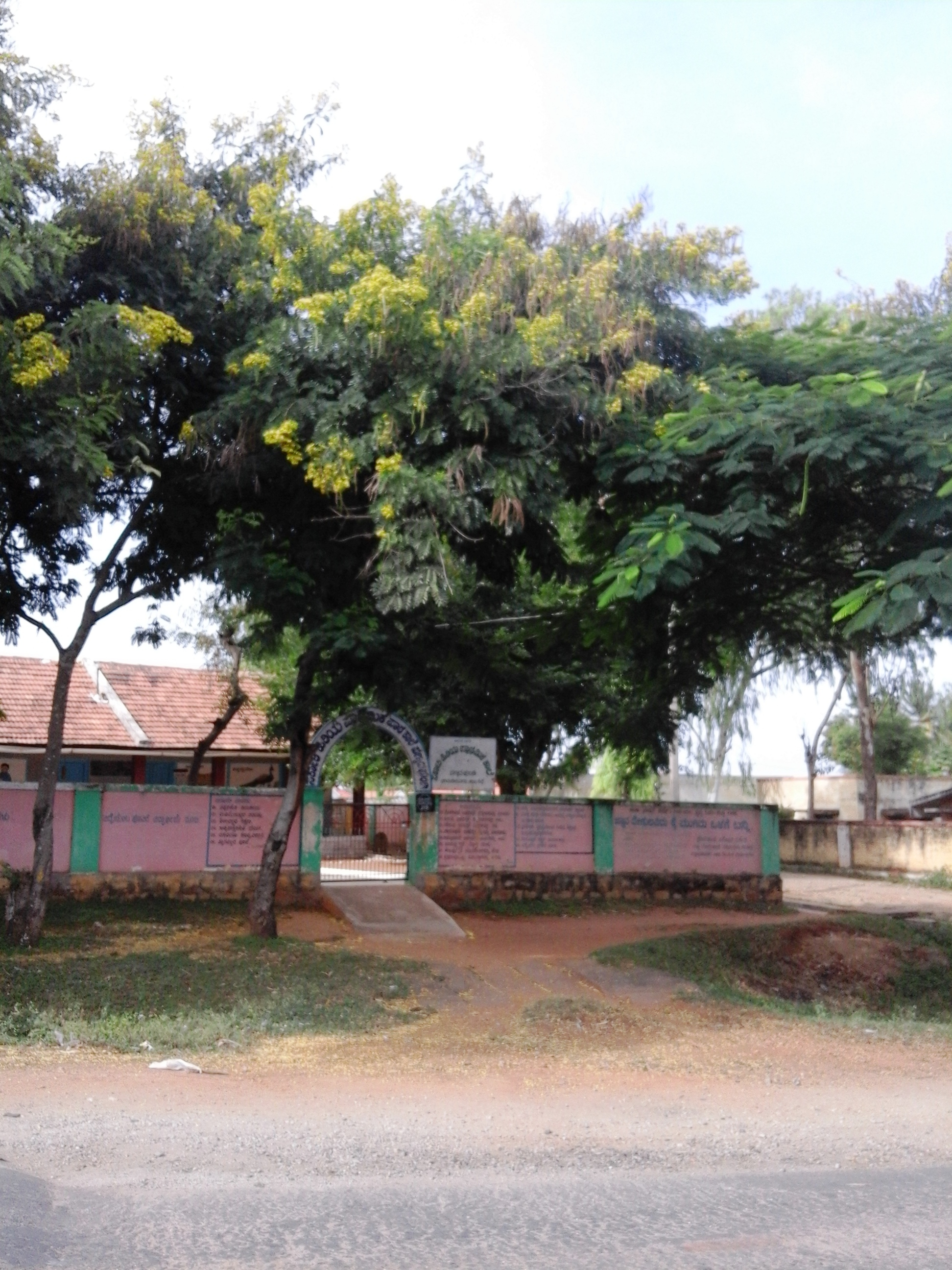
Government school

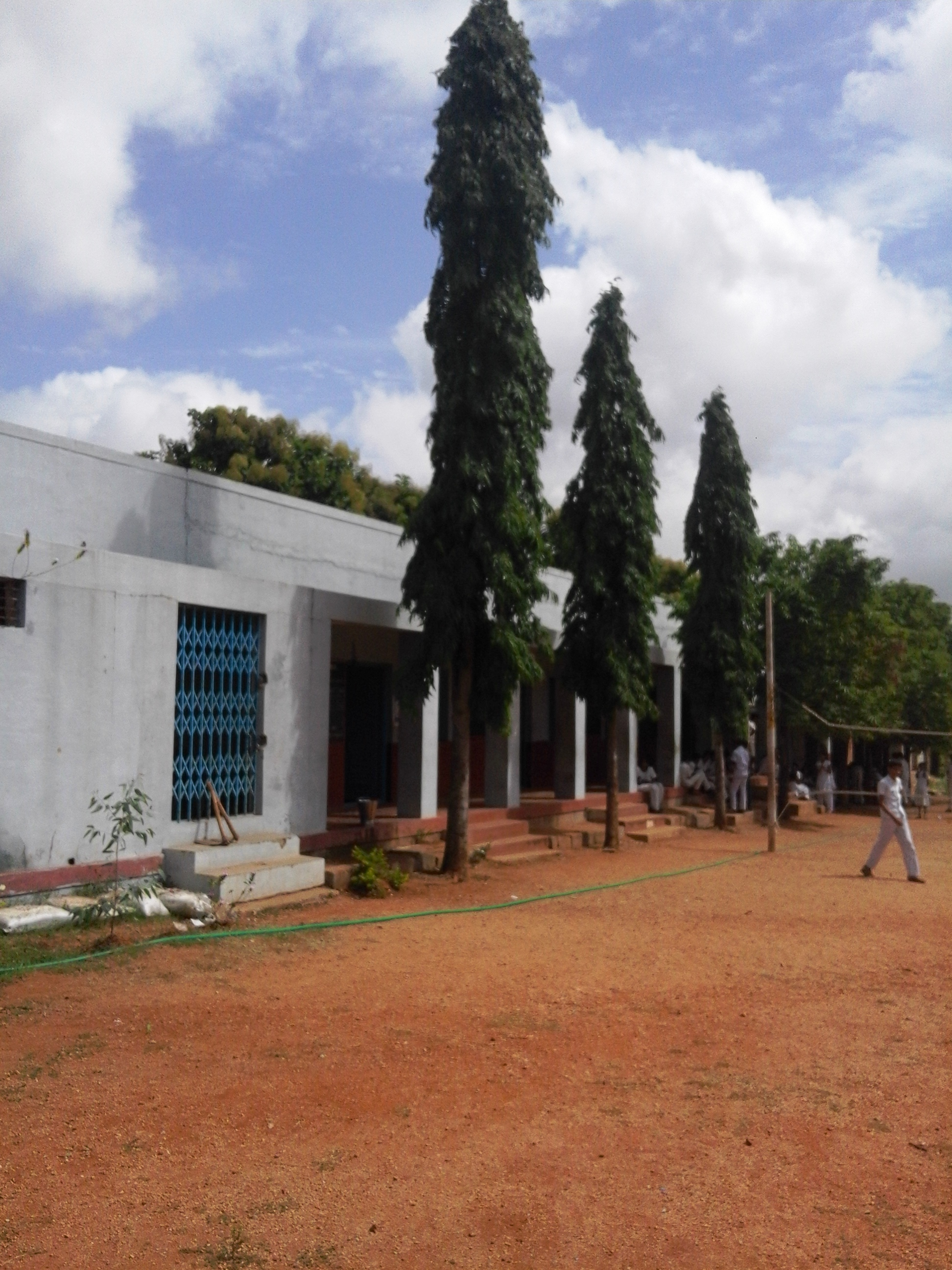
Highschool

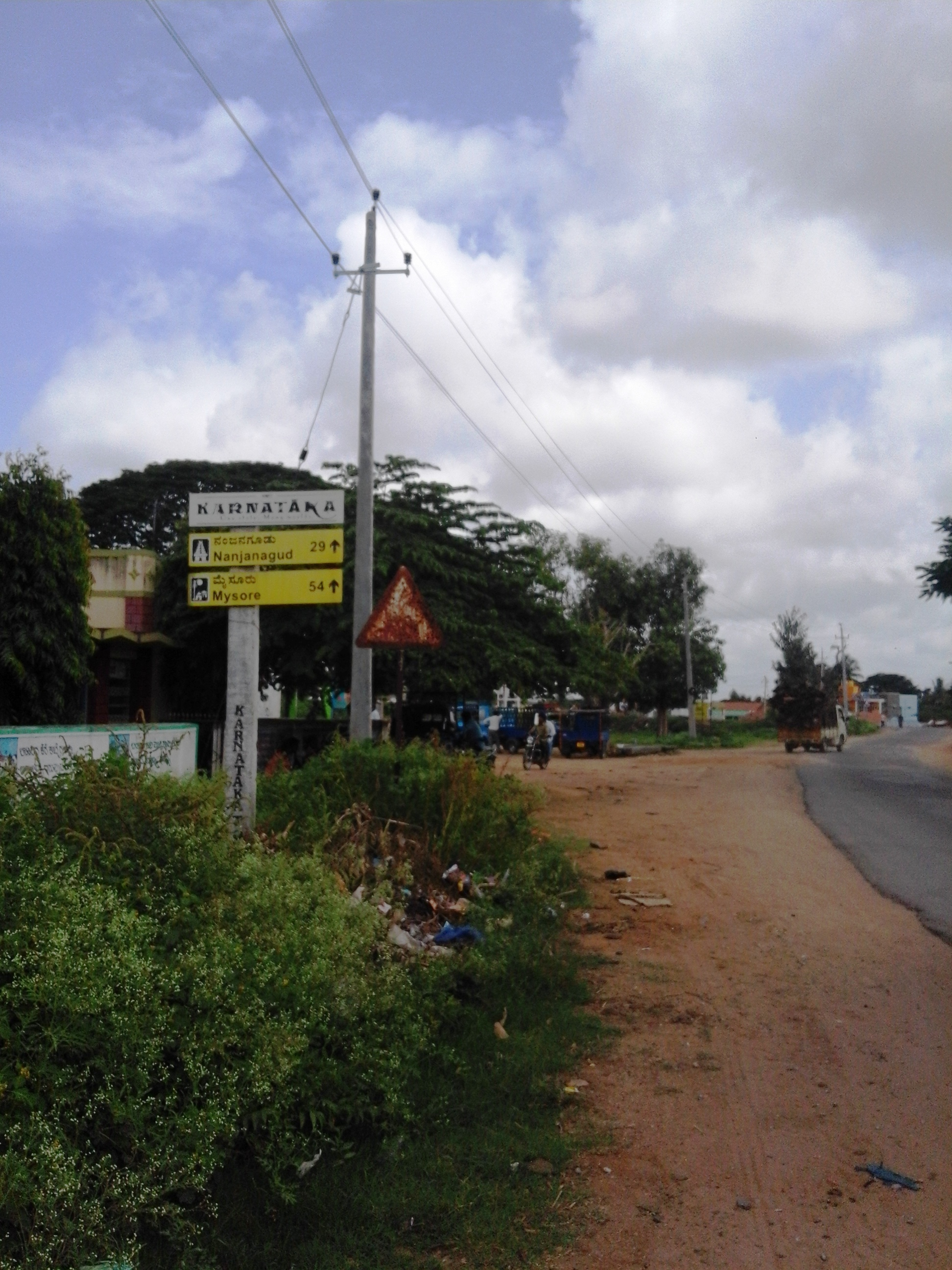
Mysore road

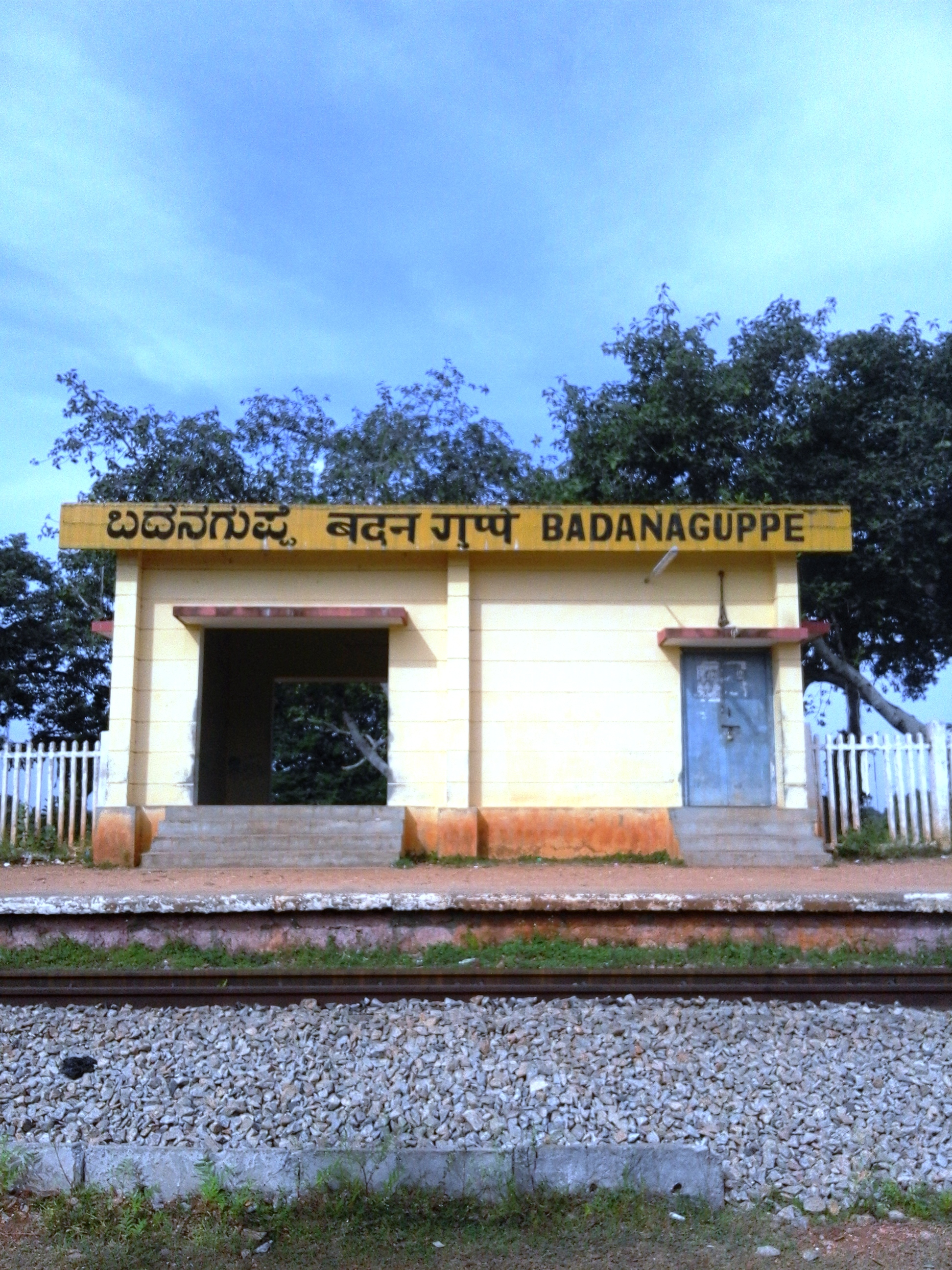
Railway station

== See also ==
- Chinnadagudihundi
- Badanavalu
- Narasam Budhi
- Kavalande
- Mariyala
- Kellamballi
