= Konanur, Mysore =

Coordinates: 12.119977°N 76.680093°E

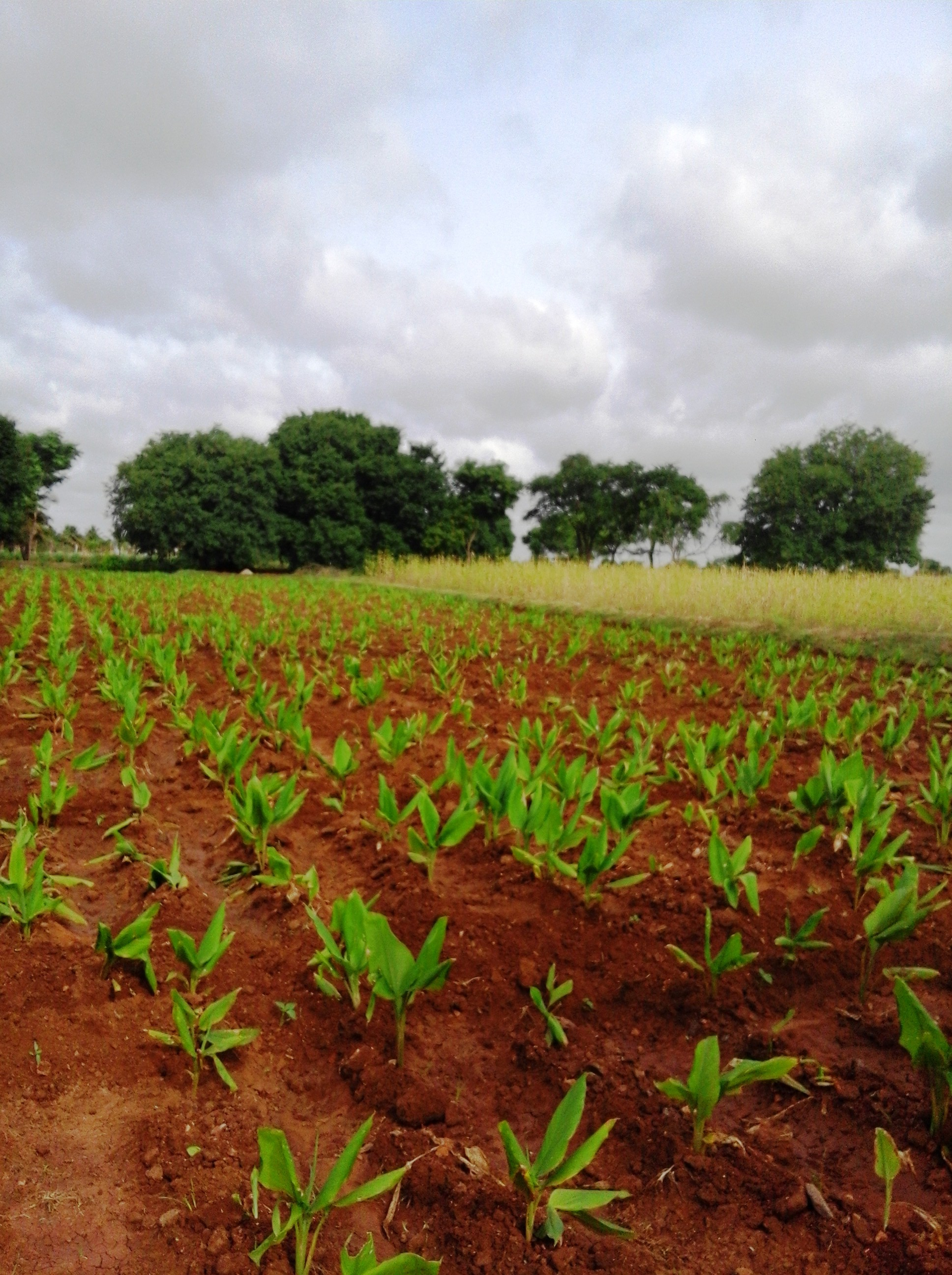
Farm at Konanur

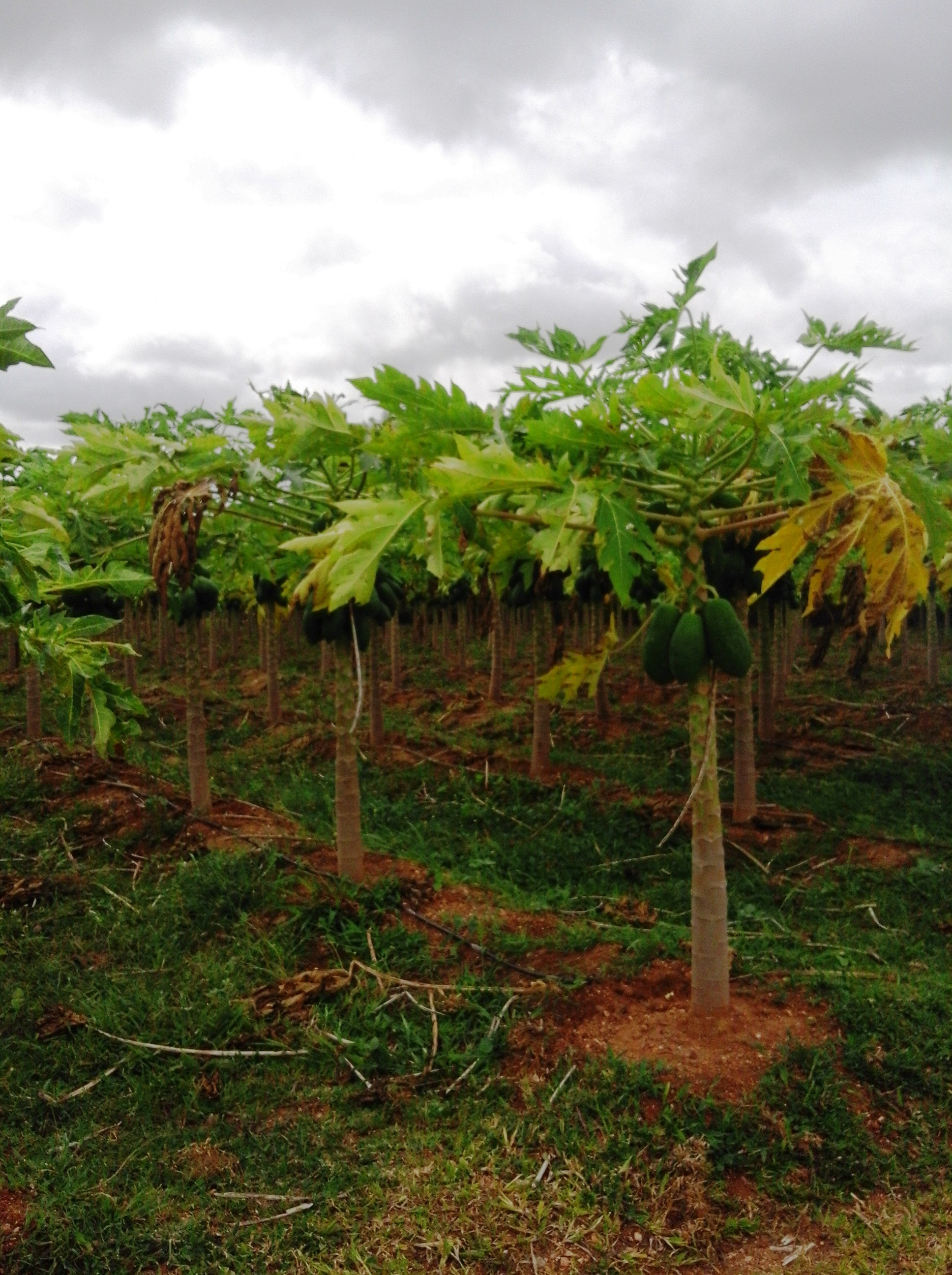
Papaya farm at Konanur

Konanur or Paduvalamarahalli is a village in Nanjangud taluk of Mysore district, Karnataka state, India.

== Location ==
Konanur is located about 15 km from the nearest town of Chamarajanagar. Nanjangud town is also nearby.

== Demographics ==
There are 1,924 people in the village living in 482 houses. The total area of the village is 705 hectares.

== Transportation ==
The village has a railways station called Konanur railway station.

== See also ==
- Nanjangud Town
- Chinnada Gudi Hundi
- Narasam Budhi
- Kavalande
- Badana Guppe
- Mariyala-Gangavadi Halt
- Chamarajanagar
- Mukkadahalli

== Image gallery ==
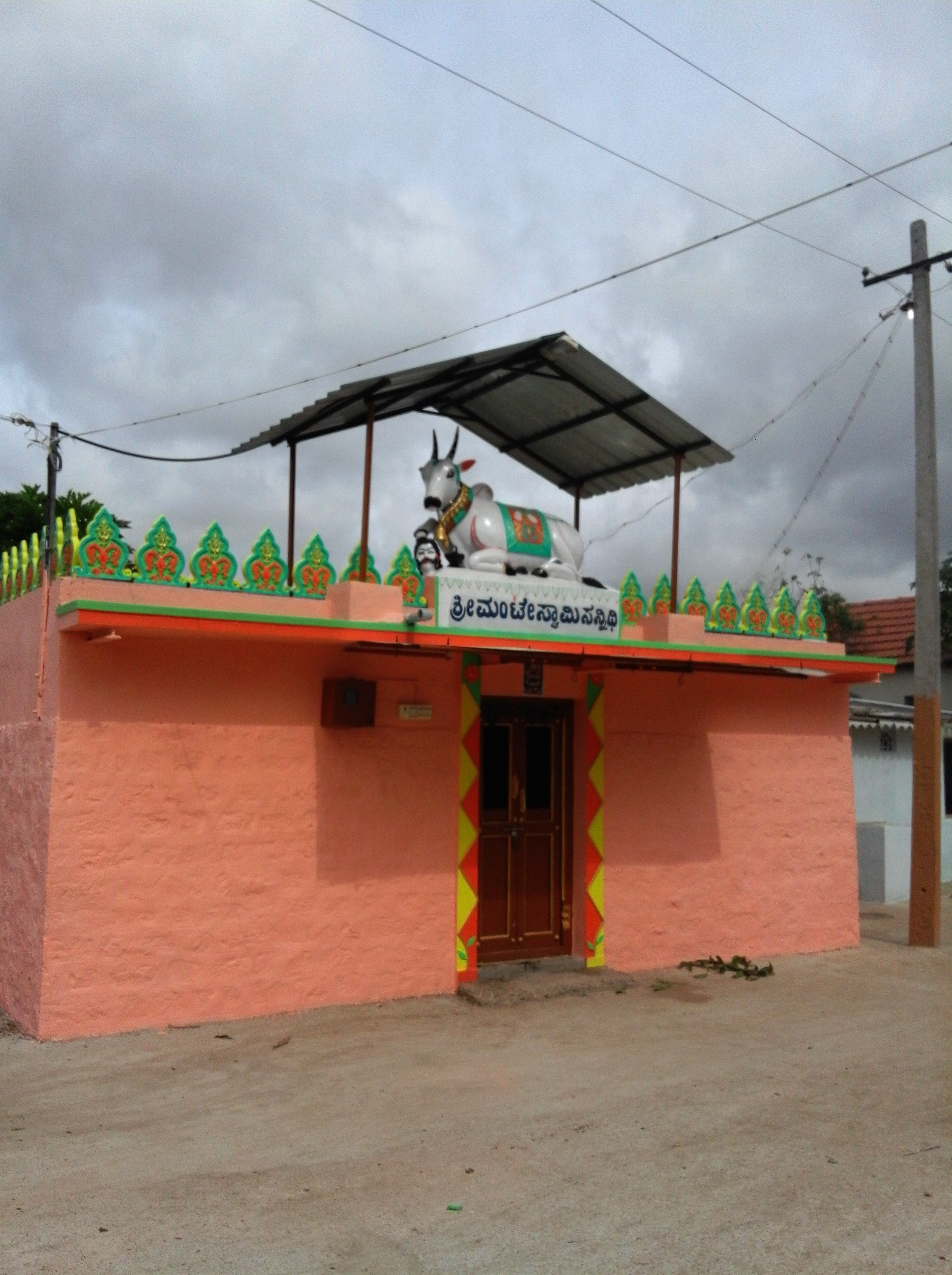
Konanur Devasthana

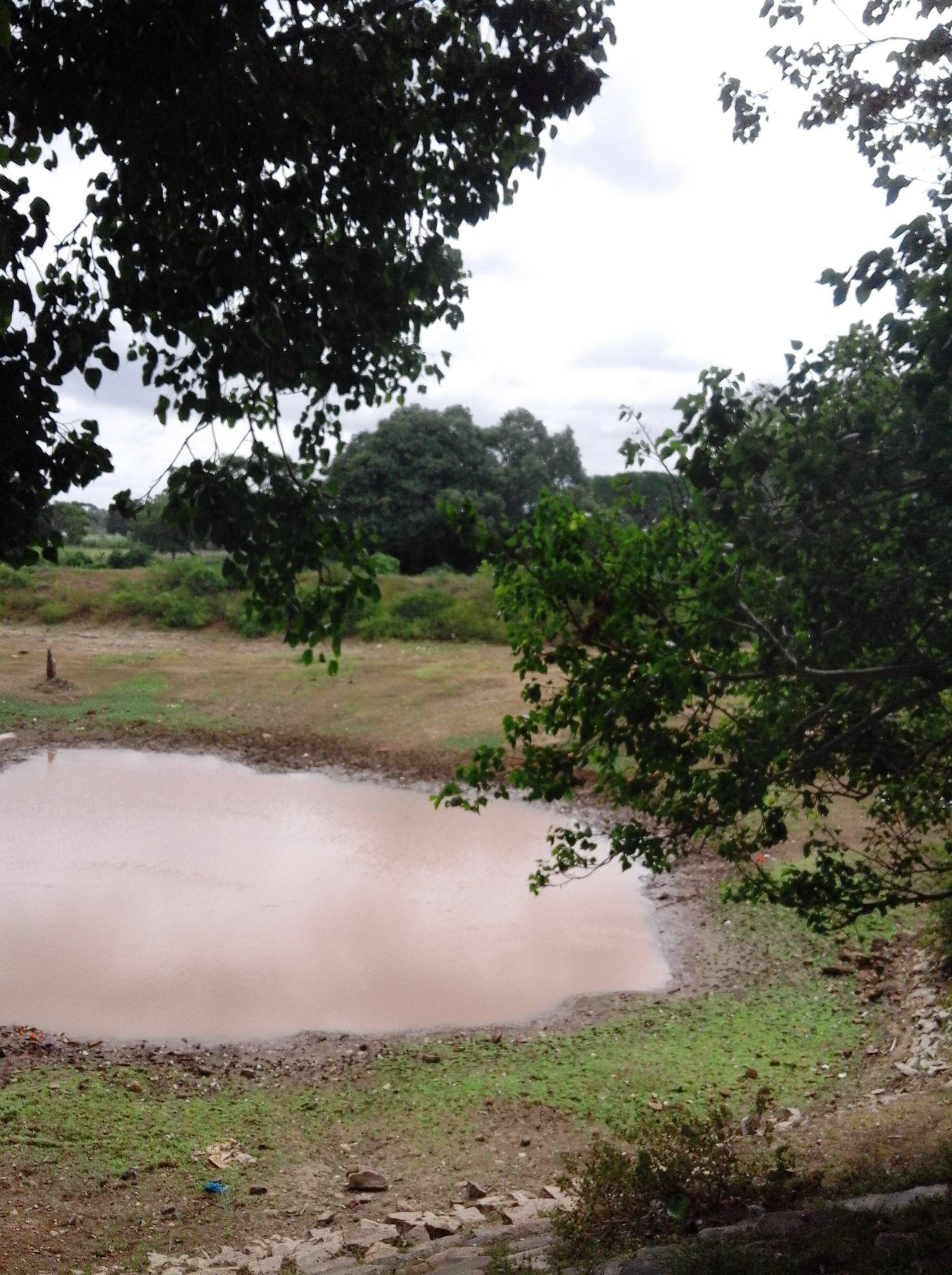
Konanur Kere

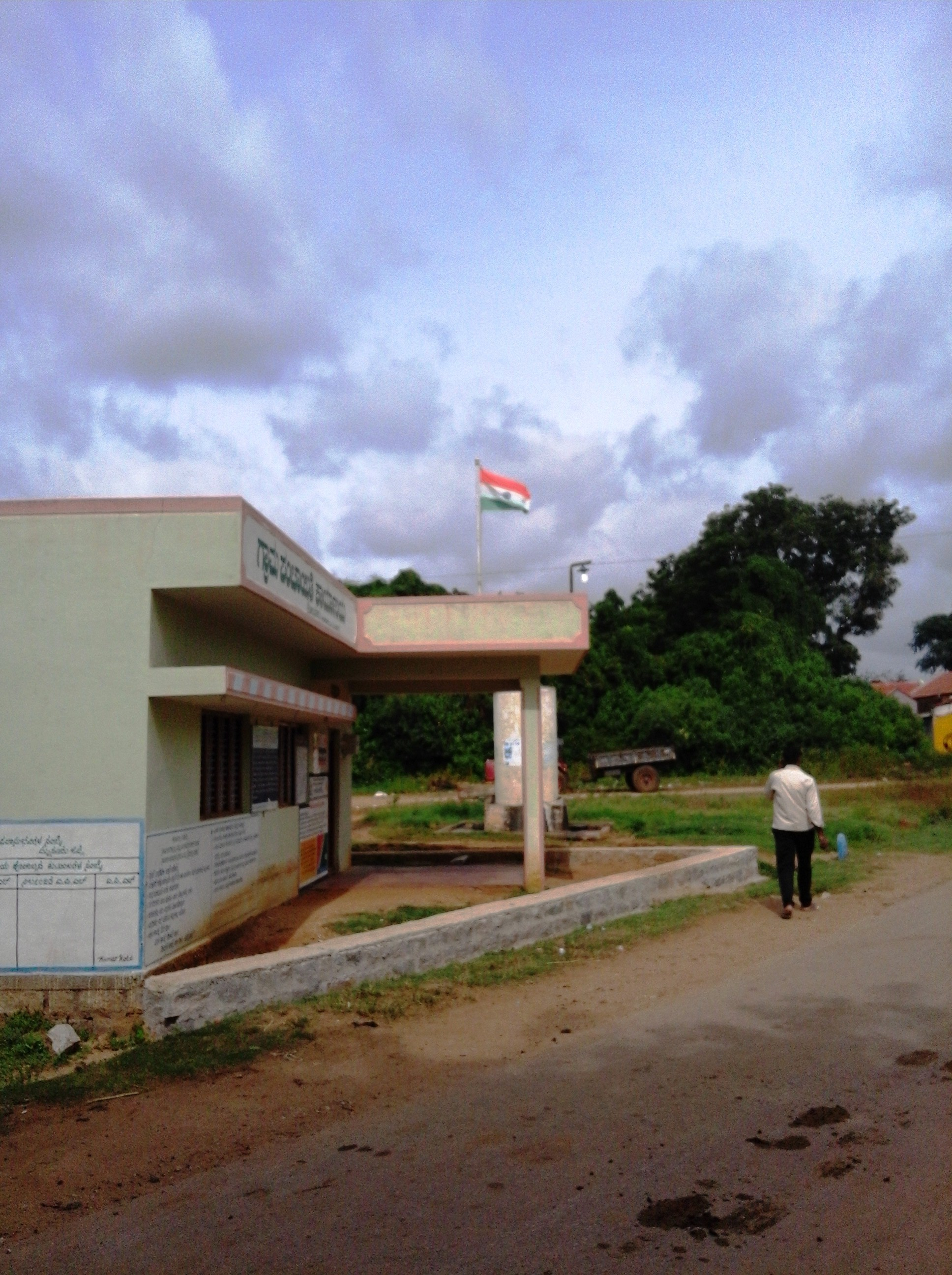
Panchayath Office

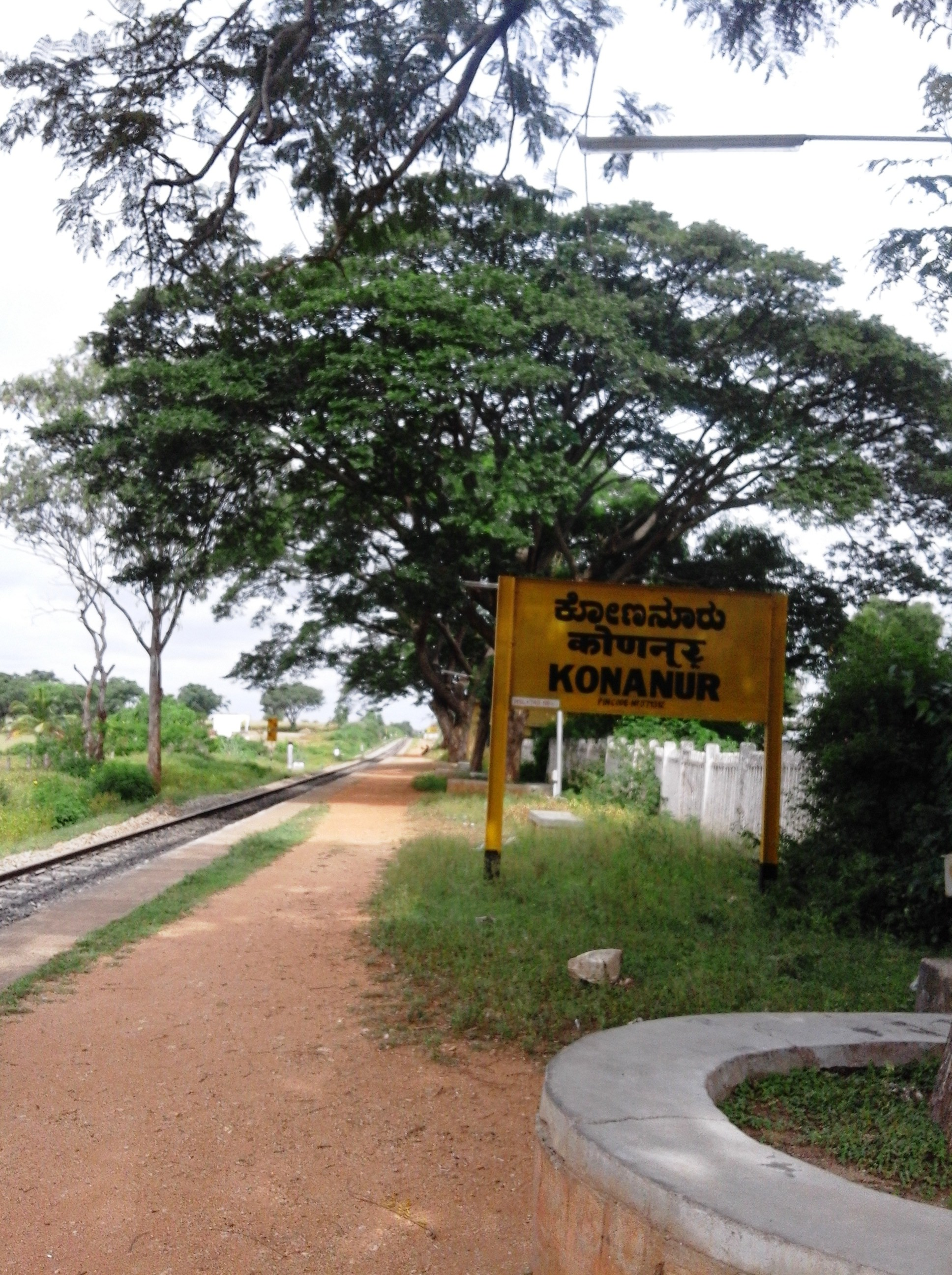
Railway Station

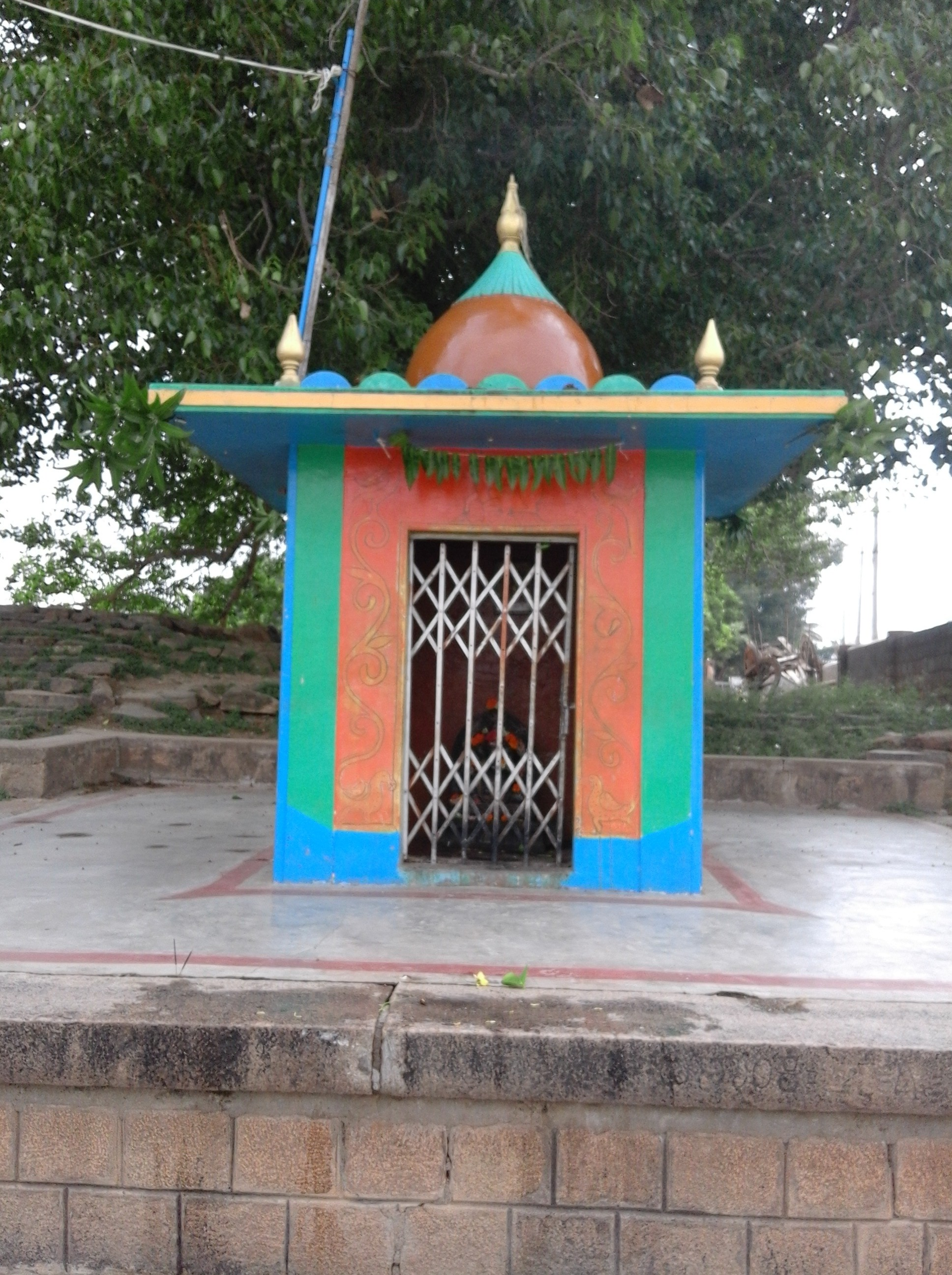
Lakeside temple
