= Konanur =

Konanur may refer to:

- Konanur, Hassan district, Karnataka, India
- Konanur, Mysore district, Karnataka, India
- Konanur railway station, Mysore district, Karnataka, India

== See also ==
- Kannur, also known as Cannanore, a city in Kannur district, Kerala, India
- South Kannanur, a town in Tamil Nadu, India
