= Badanavalu =

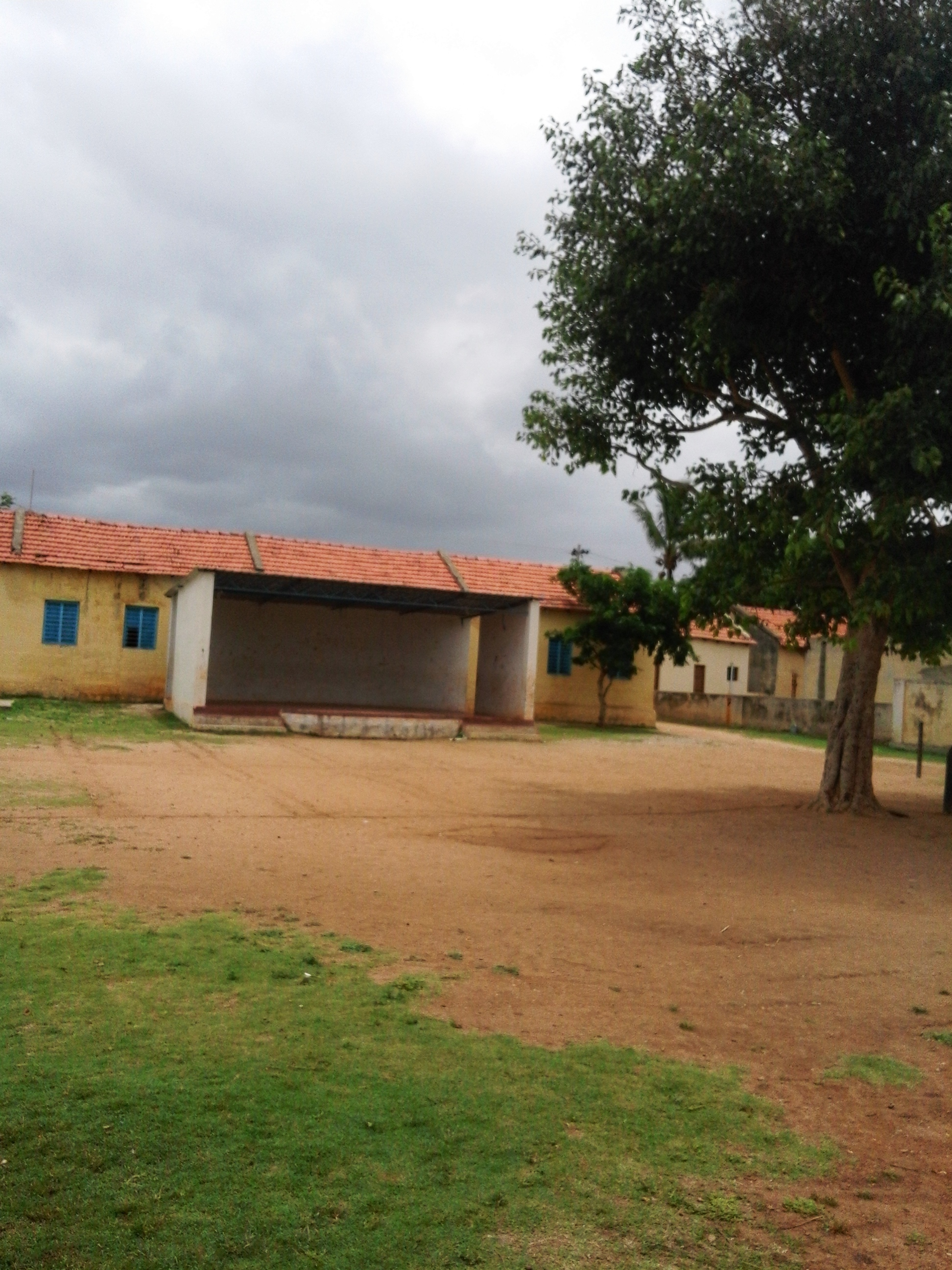
- Badanavalu School
- Interactive map of Badanavalu
- Coordinates: 12.070845°N 76.752409°E
- Country: India
- State: Karnataka
- District: Mysore
- Time zone: UTC+5:30 (IST)
- 7975265593: 571312

Badanavalu is a village in Mysore district of Karnataka state, India.

== Location ==
Badanavalu is located in Nanjangud taluk of Mysore district, on the road between Mysore and Chamarajanagar. Badanavalu is 34 km from Mysore, 10 km from Nanjangud, and 158 km away from the state capital Bangalore.

The village railway station is called Narasambudhi

== History ==
The village was formerly called Narasam Budhi.

Mahatma Gandhi visited this village in 1932. At that time Badanavalu village was a center of khadi production, and Gandhi wanted to promote the village industries. Gandhi was surprised by the success of a khadi plant that ran on a 7.5-acre campus. In 1927, they established a khadi center with only four Dalit women. Today more than 300 women work in that center.

=== Communal Clashes ===
In 1993, three backward class farmers were murdered by a group of upper caste people in Badanavalu village. The criminals were punished only after 17 years. As a retaliation, the Dalits set fire to the house of the upper caste people living in Ummathur village. A Dalit rally in Nanjangud was fired upon by the police and two of the volunteers died in the mishap.

== Railway Station ==
Badanavalu is served by Narasambudhi railway station.

== Demographics ==
The population of the village is 2,784 and there are a total of 632 families. The literacy is 63%. There are a total of 632 houses.

== Legends ==
According to one mythological story, a god called Bhairaveshwara came to the village and threw brinjal to each house and named the village Badanavalu.

== Temples ==
- Lakshmi Kantha Swamy Temple, Badanavalu

== Post Office ==
Badanavalu has a post office and the postal code is 571312.

== Schools ==
- Government Higher Primary School, Badanvalu.
- A private Secondary school

== Events ==
- National Symposium on Sustainable Living

On 19 April 2015, a National Symposium on Sustainable Living was held in Badanavalu. It was led by noted theatre director and playwright Prasanna. Many noted social activists were present and participated in various seminars. Thousands of people attended the symposium. They also visited the Khadi Center established in 1927.

== See also ==
- Chinnadagudihundi
- Kavalande
- Badanaguppe
- Mariyala Gangavadi railway station
- Mukkadahalli

== Image Gallery ==
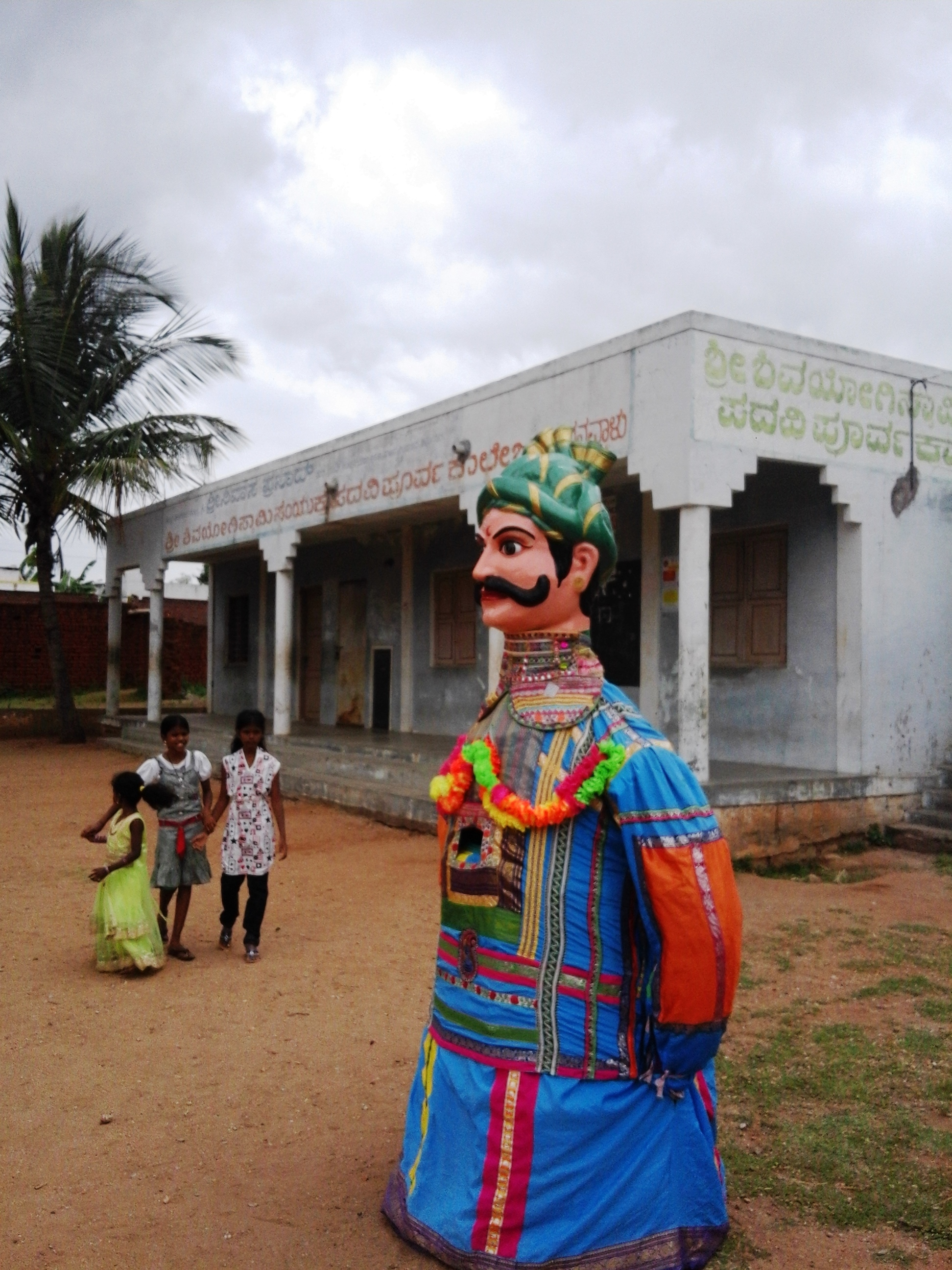
Badanavalu Highschool

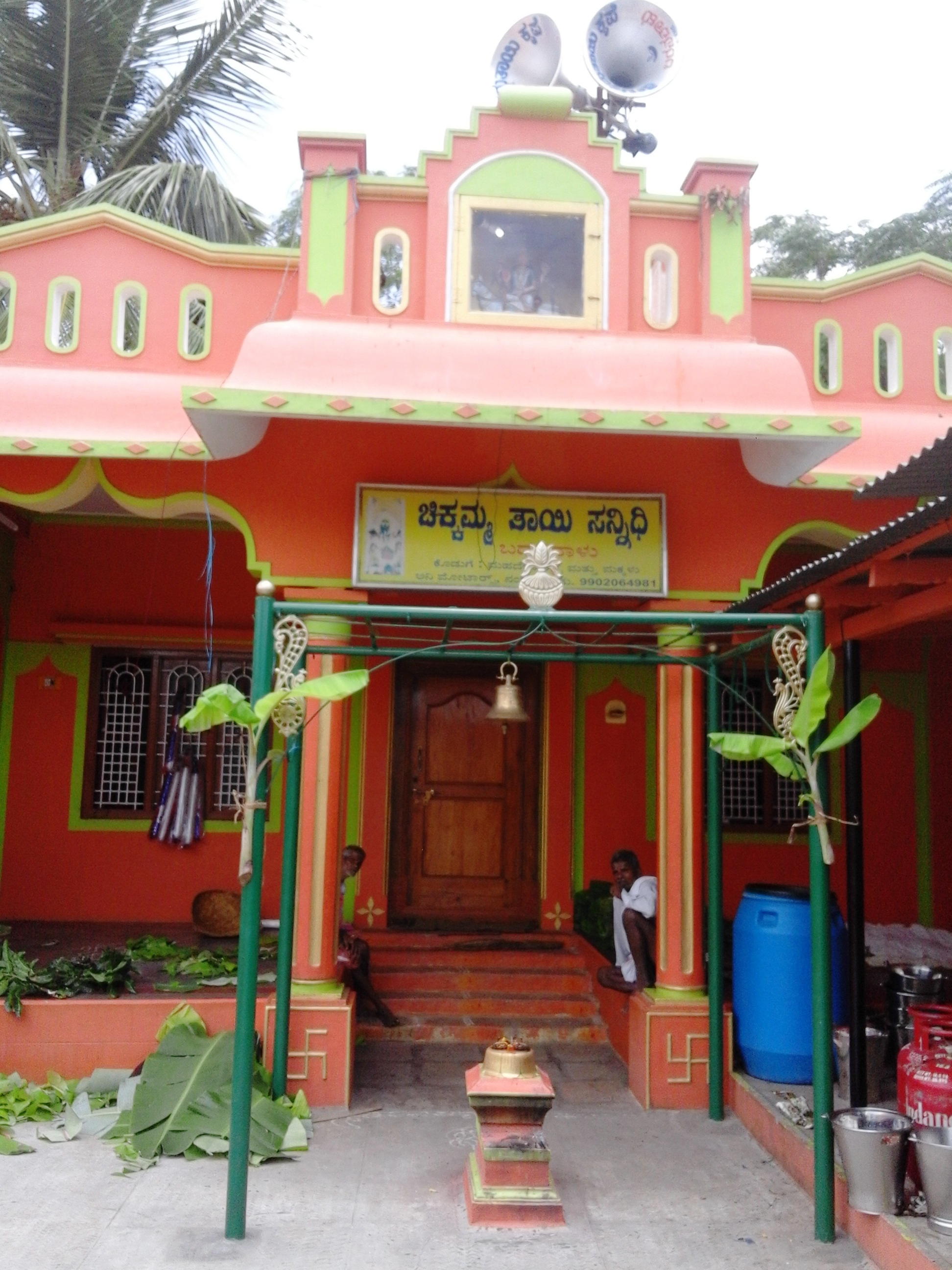
Badanavalu Temple

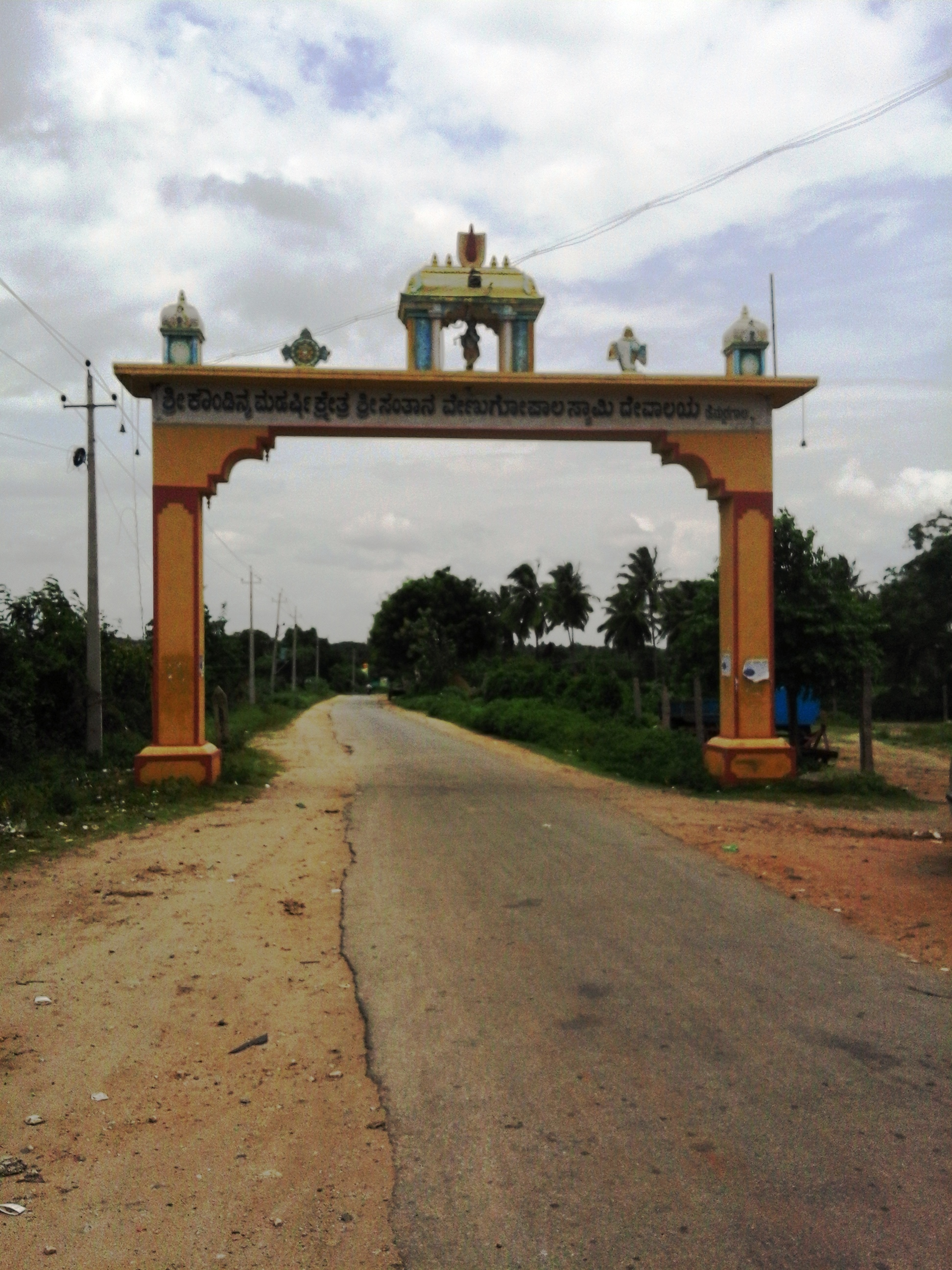
Village gate
