= Badanaguppe railway station =

Railway station in Karnataka, India

Badanaguppe
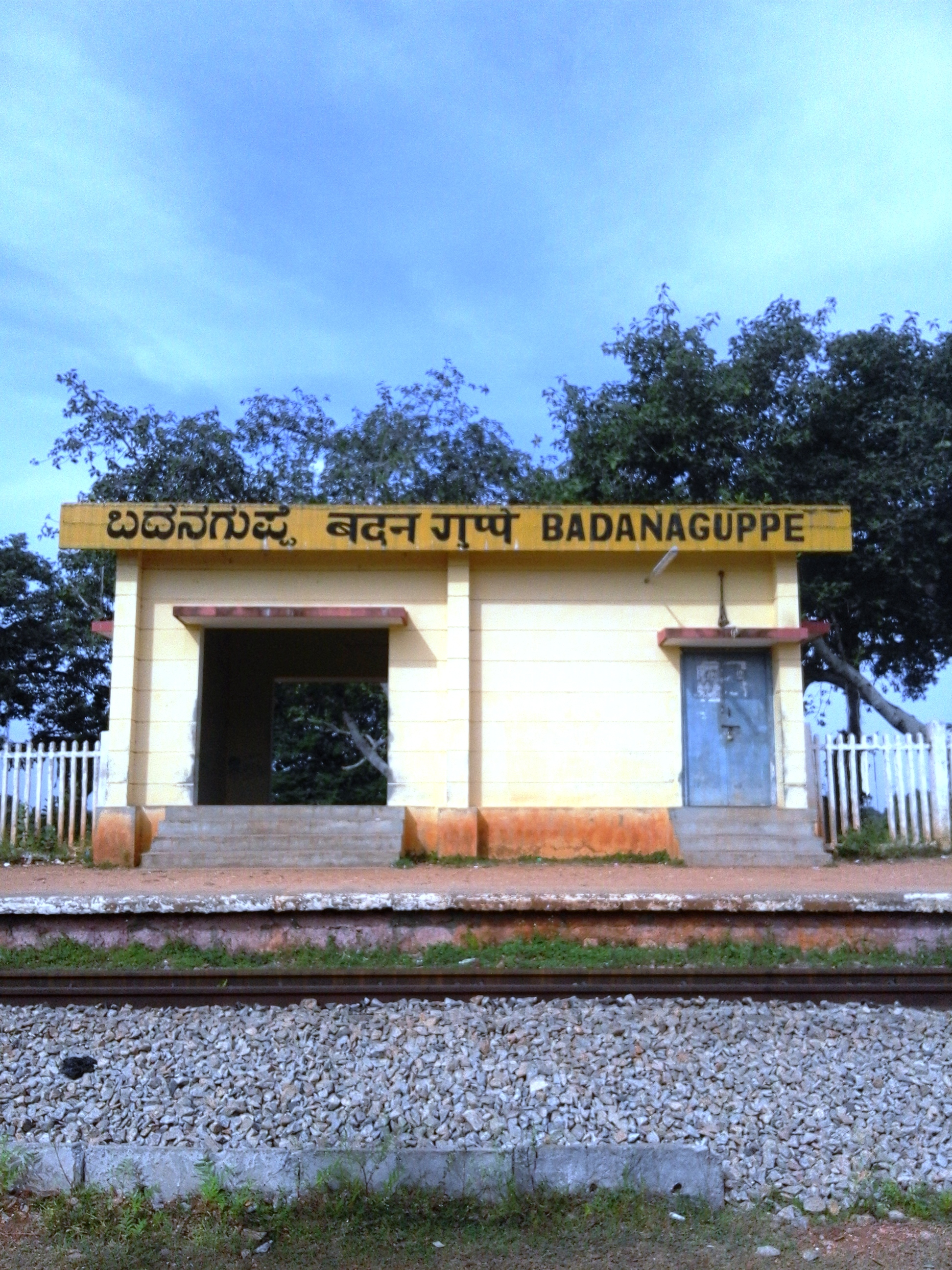
- Badanaguppe railway station

General information
- Location: Chamarajanagar District, Karnataka; India
- Coordinates: 11.996138°N 76.858921°E
- Elevation: 760 m (2,490 ft)
- System: Indian Railways station
- Platforms: 2

Construction
- Structure type: Standard (on ground station)
- Parking: Yes

Other information
- Status: Functioning
- Station code: BDGP
- Zone(s): South Western Railway
- Division(s): Mysore

History
- Opened: 2008
Location

Badanaguppe is a railway station on Mysore–Chamarajanagar branch line. The station is located in Chamarajanagar district, Karnataka state, India.

== Location ==
Badanaguppe railway station is located near Badanaguppe village in Mysore district.

== History ==
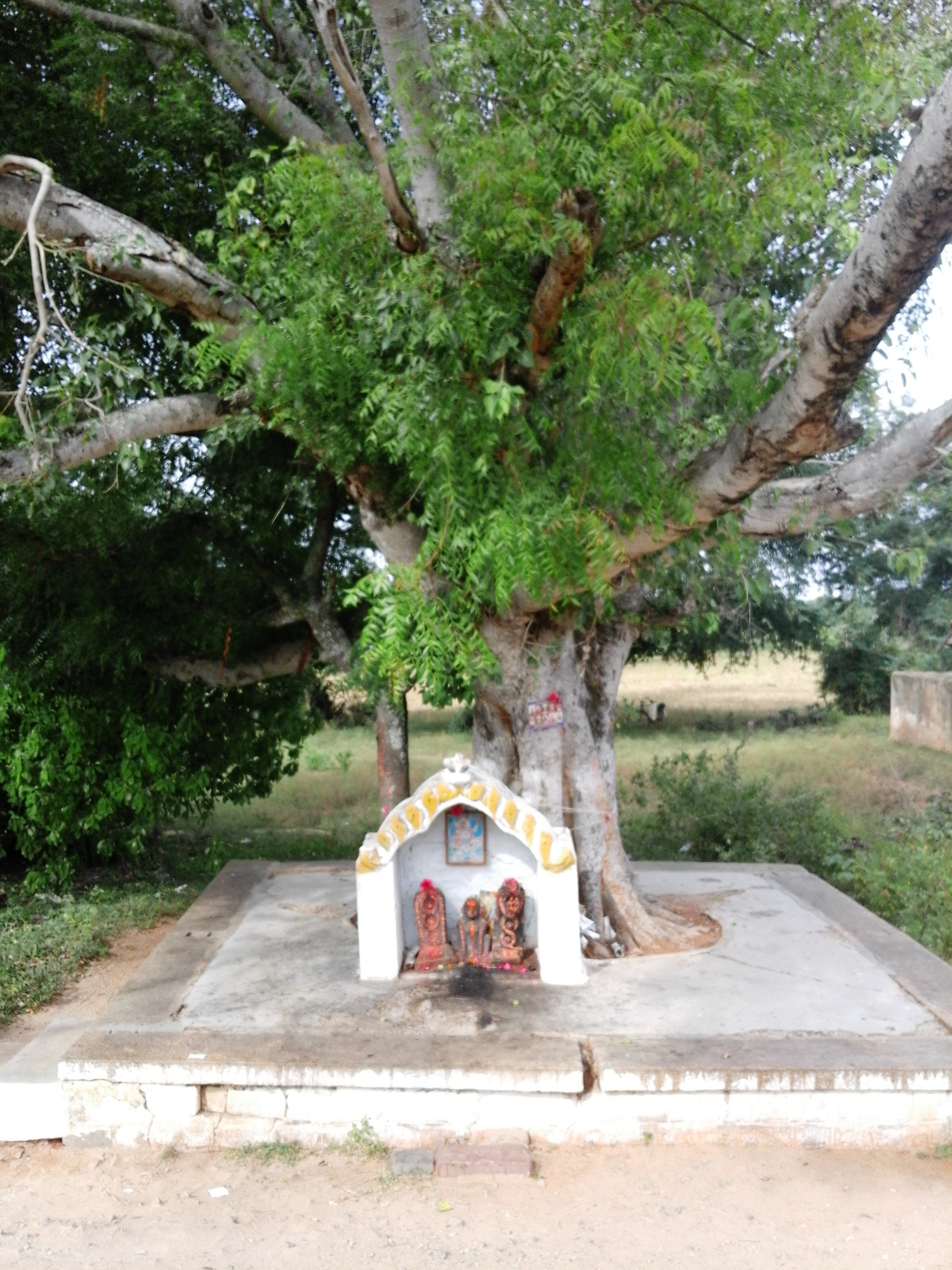
Tree worship on the railway station road

The project cost ₹313 crore (US$33 million). The gauge conversion work of the 61 kilometres (38 mi) stretch was completed. There are six trains running forward and backward in this route. Five of them are slow moving passenger trains.

== Services ==
There are trains to Mysore at 7.03 am, 10.50am, 5.00pm, 6.03pm and 8.55 pm. There are trains to Chamarajanagar at 5.50 am, 7.50 am, 9.45 am, 11.10am, 1.10pm, 3.10pm and 7.10pm.
