= Narasambudhi railway station =

Railway station in Karnataka

Narasambudhi
- Narasambudhi railway station

General information
- Location: Mysore District, Karnataka; India
- Coordinates: 12.075533°N 76.749526°E
- Elevation: 760 m (2,490 ft)
- System: Indian Railways station
- Platforms: 2

Construction
- Structure type: Standard (on ground station)
- Parking: Yes

Other information
- Status: Functioning
- Station code: NBU
- Zone(s): South Western Railway
- Division(s): Mysore

History
- Opened: 2008
Location

Narasambudhi is a railway station on Mysore–Chamarajanagar branch line. The station serves Badanavalu village near Nanjangud in Mysore district, Karnataka state, India.

== History ==
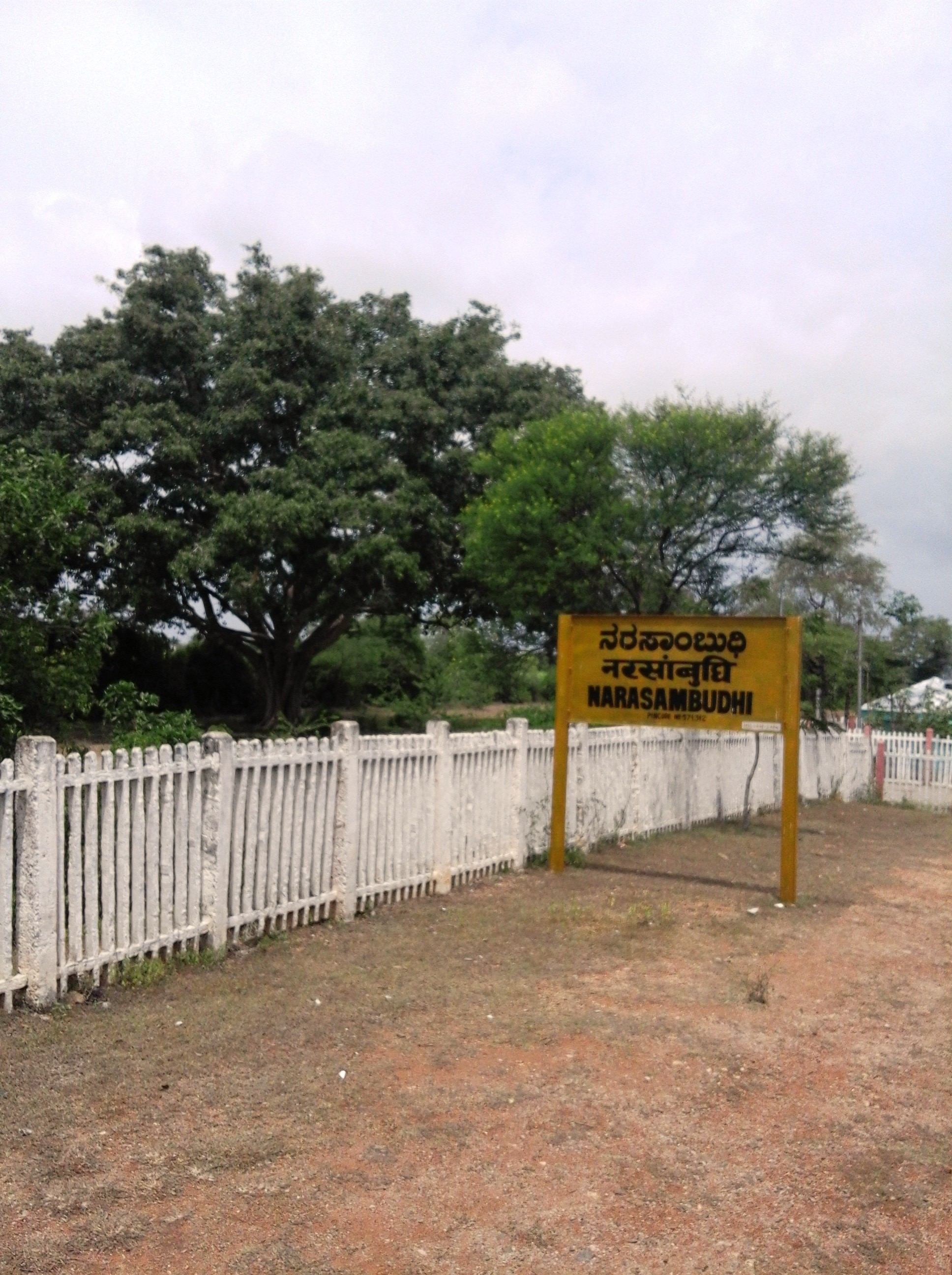
The only platform

The project cost ₹313 crore (US$33 million). The gauge conversion work of the 61 kilometres (38 mi) stretch was completed. There are six trains running forward and backward in this route. Five of them are slow moving passenger trains.

== See also ==
- Narasam Budhi village
