= Kavalande =

Coordinates: 12.036375°N 76.794528°E

Kavalande is a village in Nanjangud taluk, Mysore district of Karnataka state, India, between Nanjangud town and Chamarajanagar town.

There is a railway station in Kavalande, part of the Chamarajanagar branch line.

== Image gallery ==
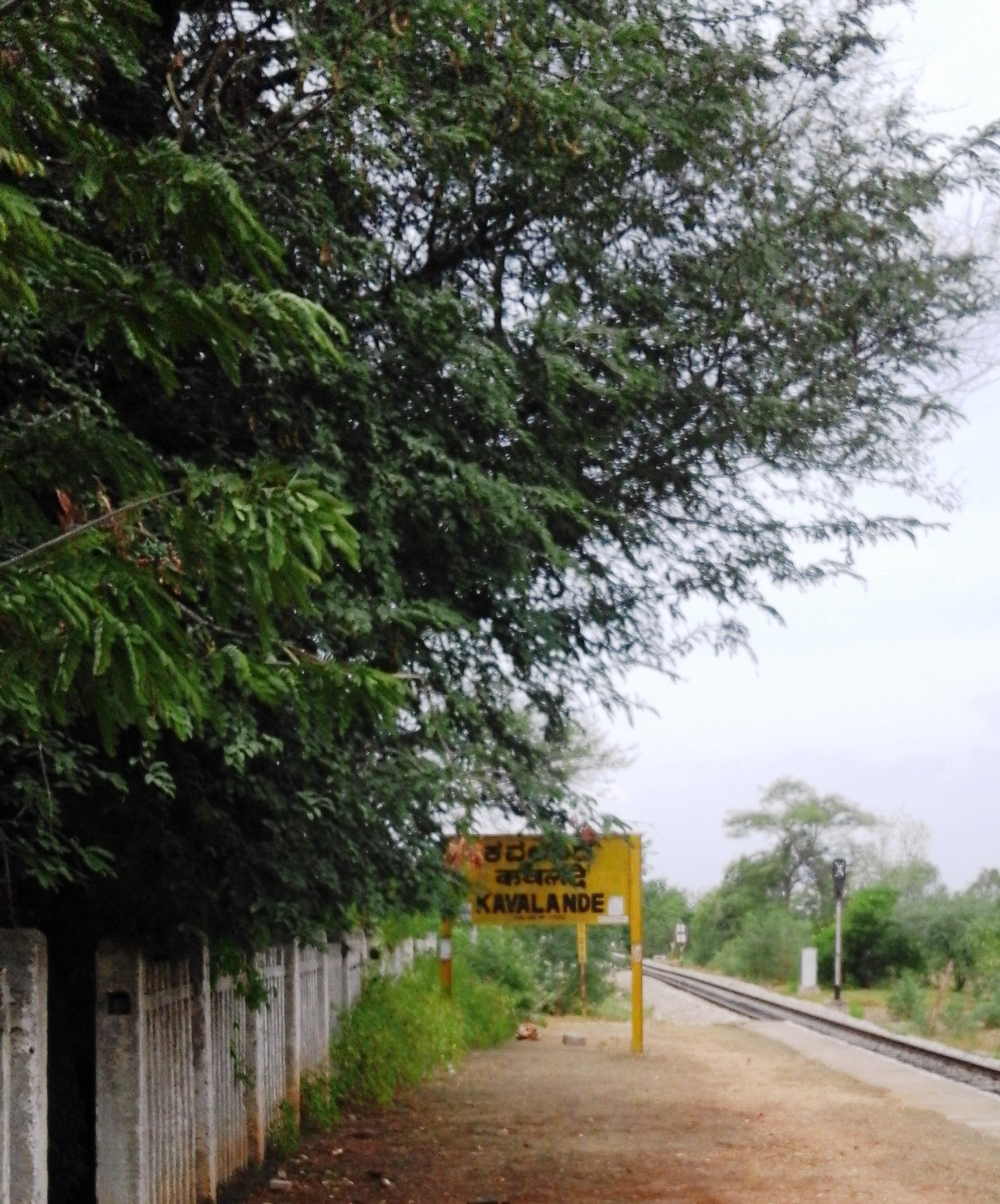
Kavalande Halt

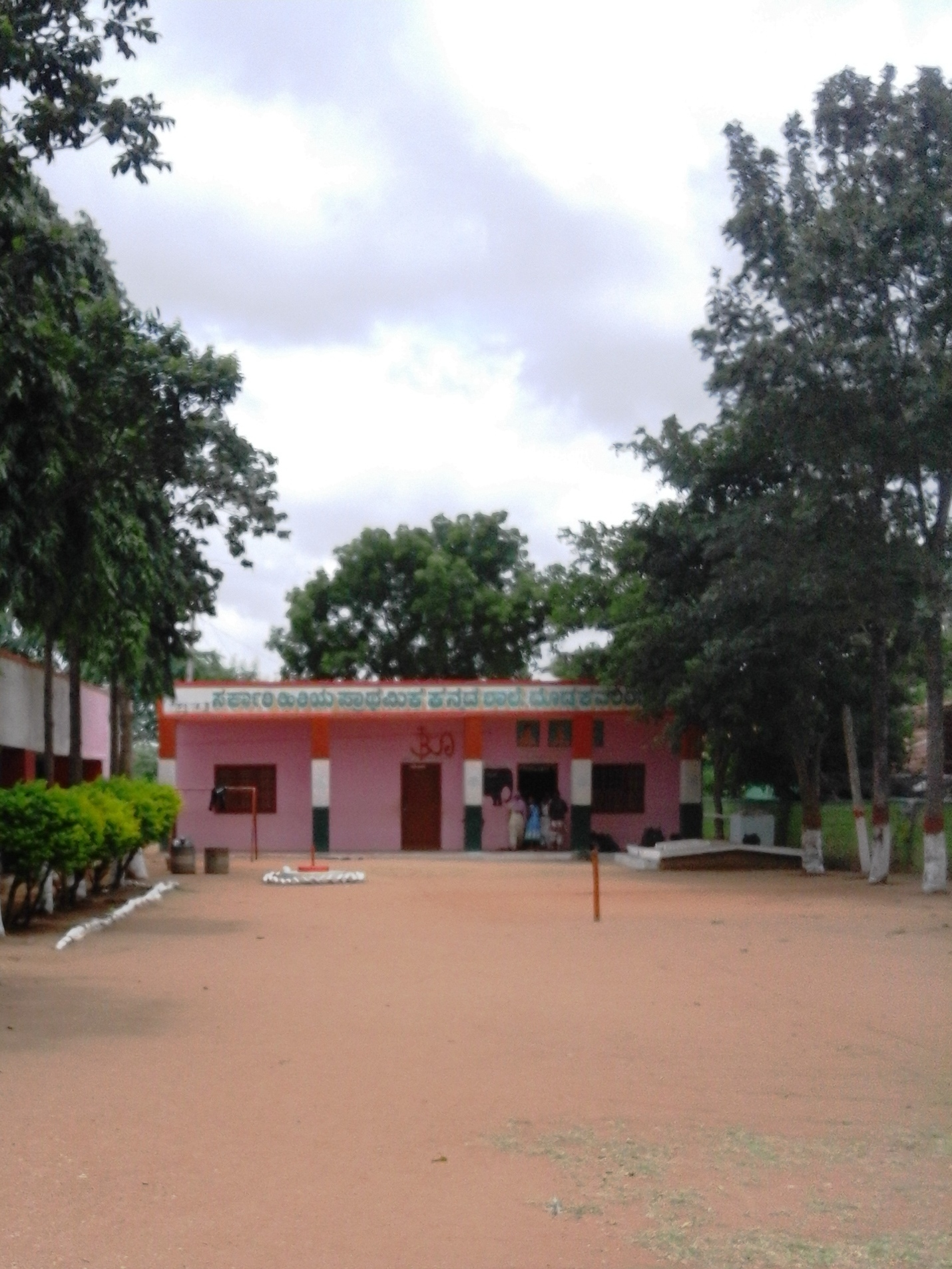
Kavalande School

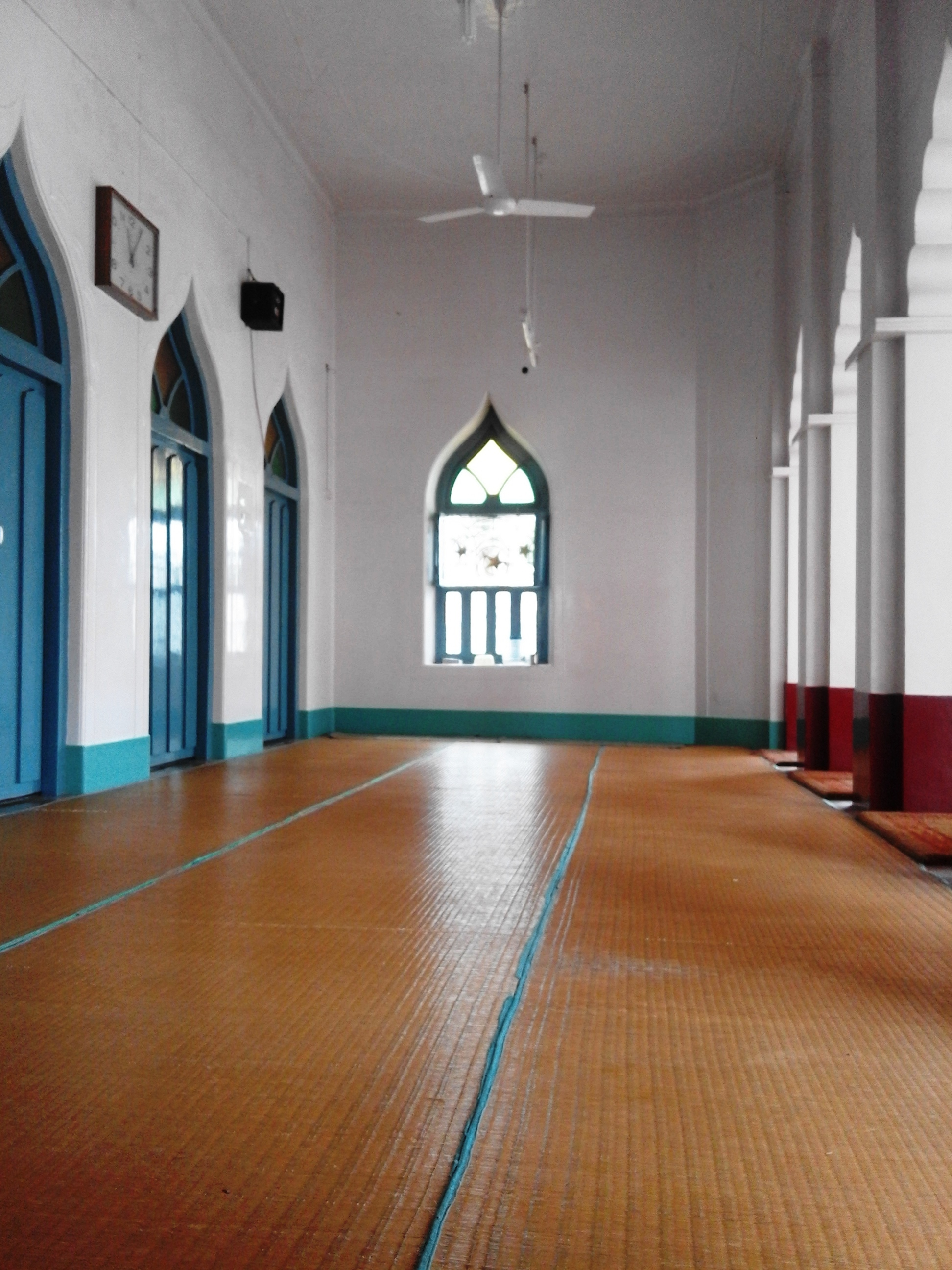
Kavalande Mosque

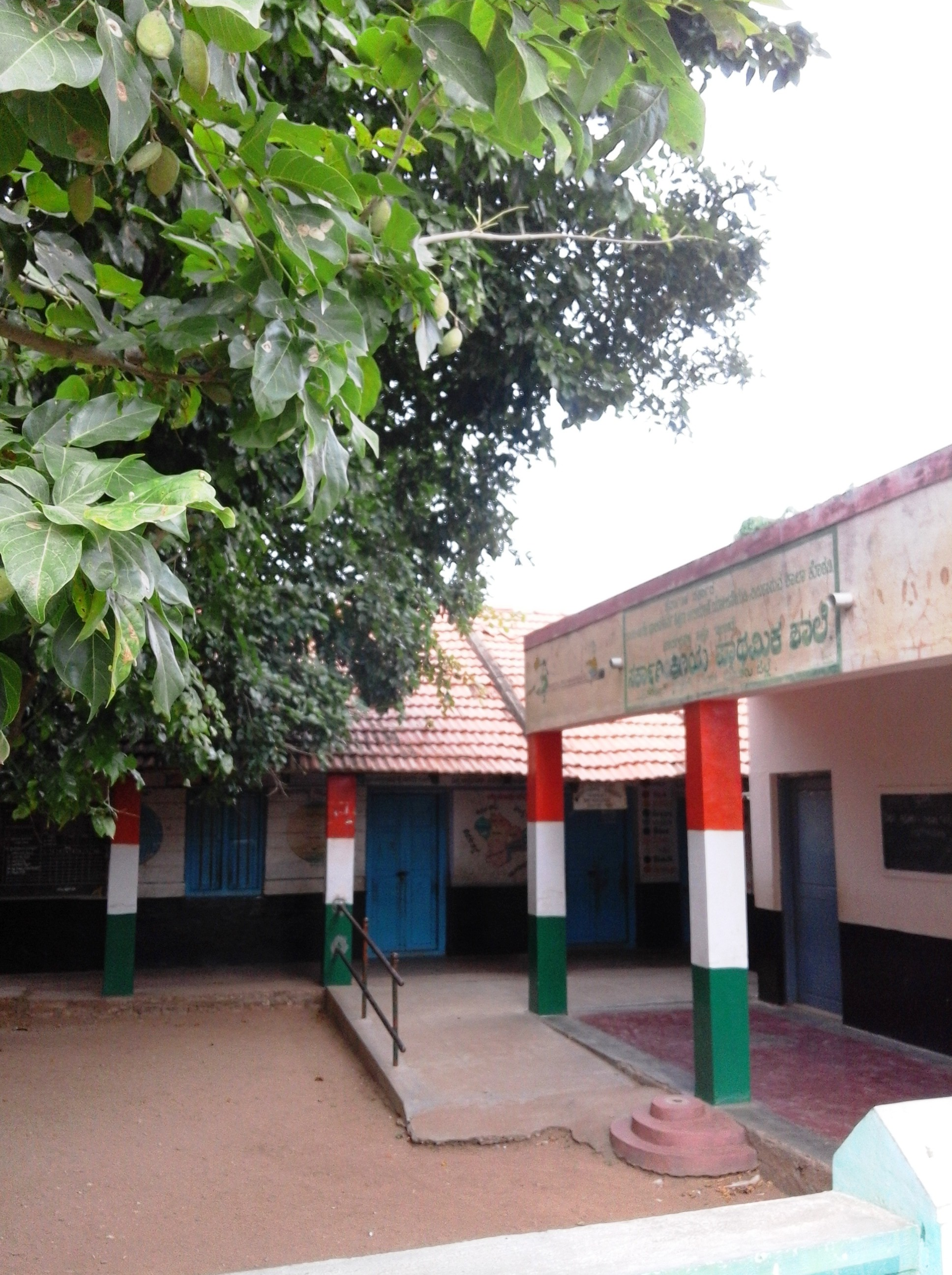
School at Chikkawlande

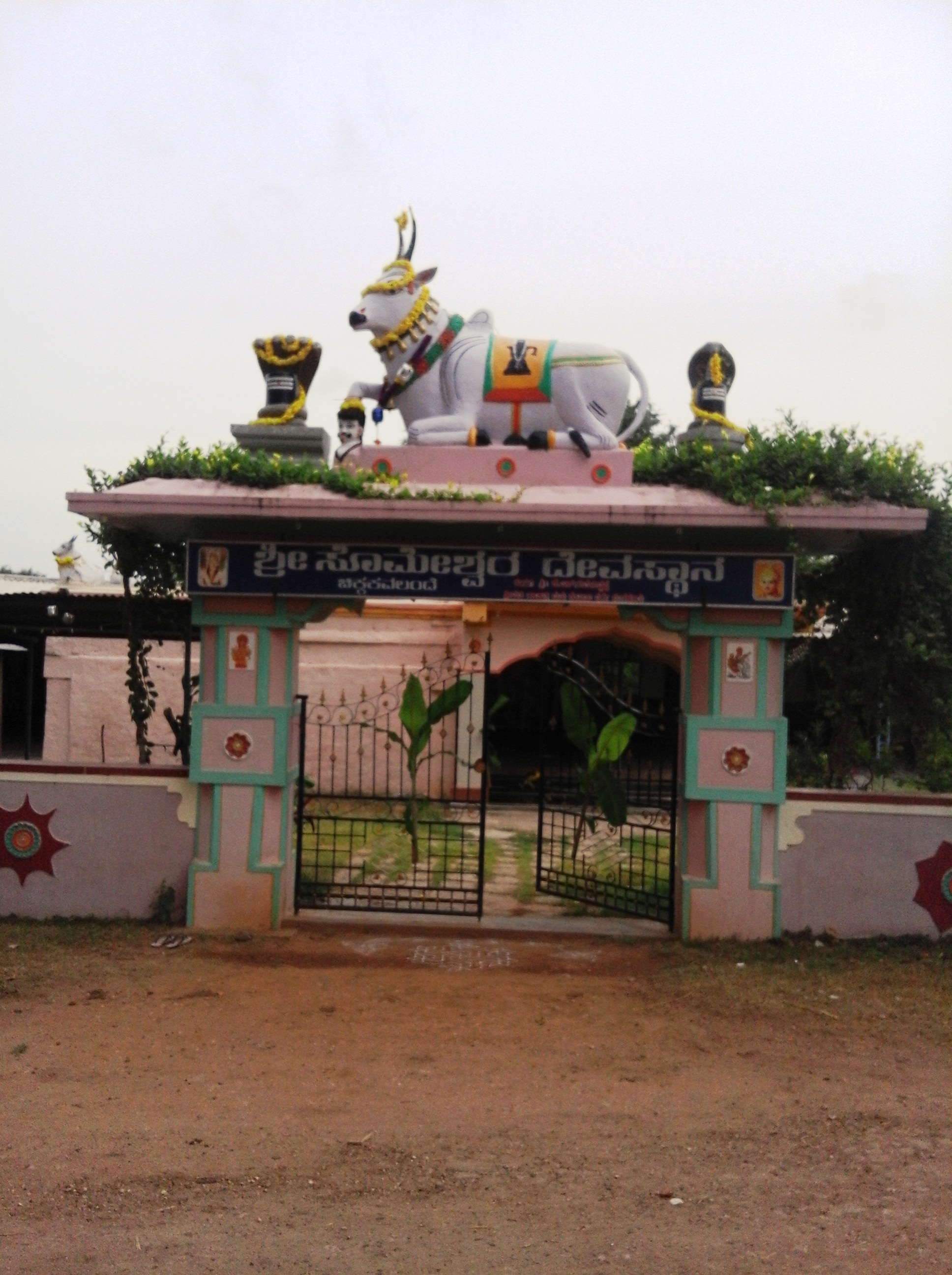
Temple at Chikkawalande

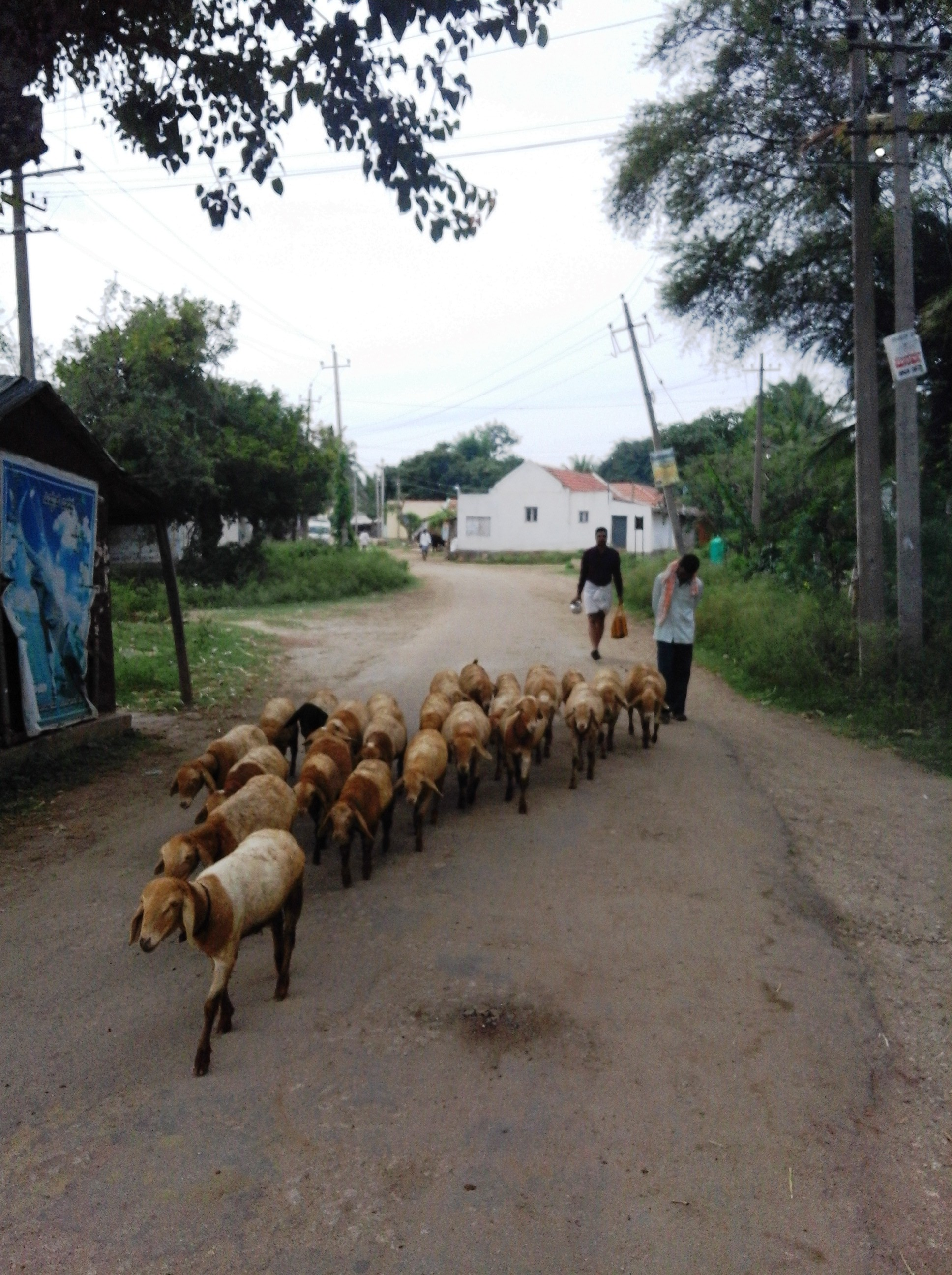
Shepherds at Chikkawlande

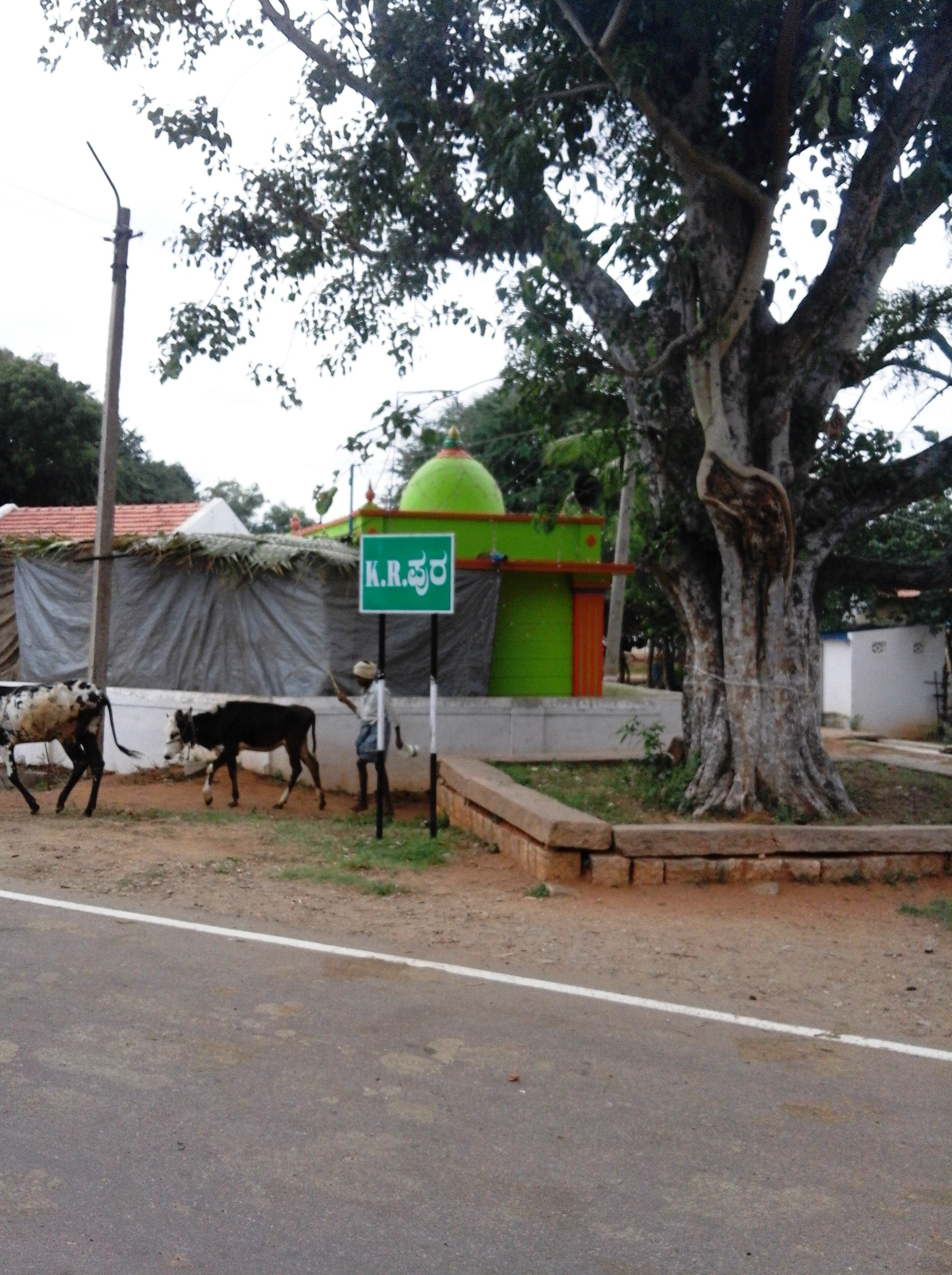
K.R.Puram Kavalande

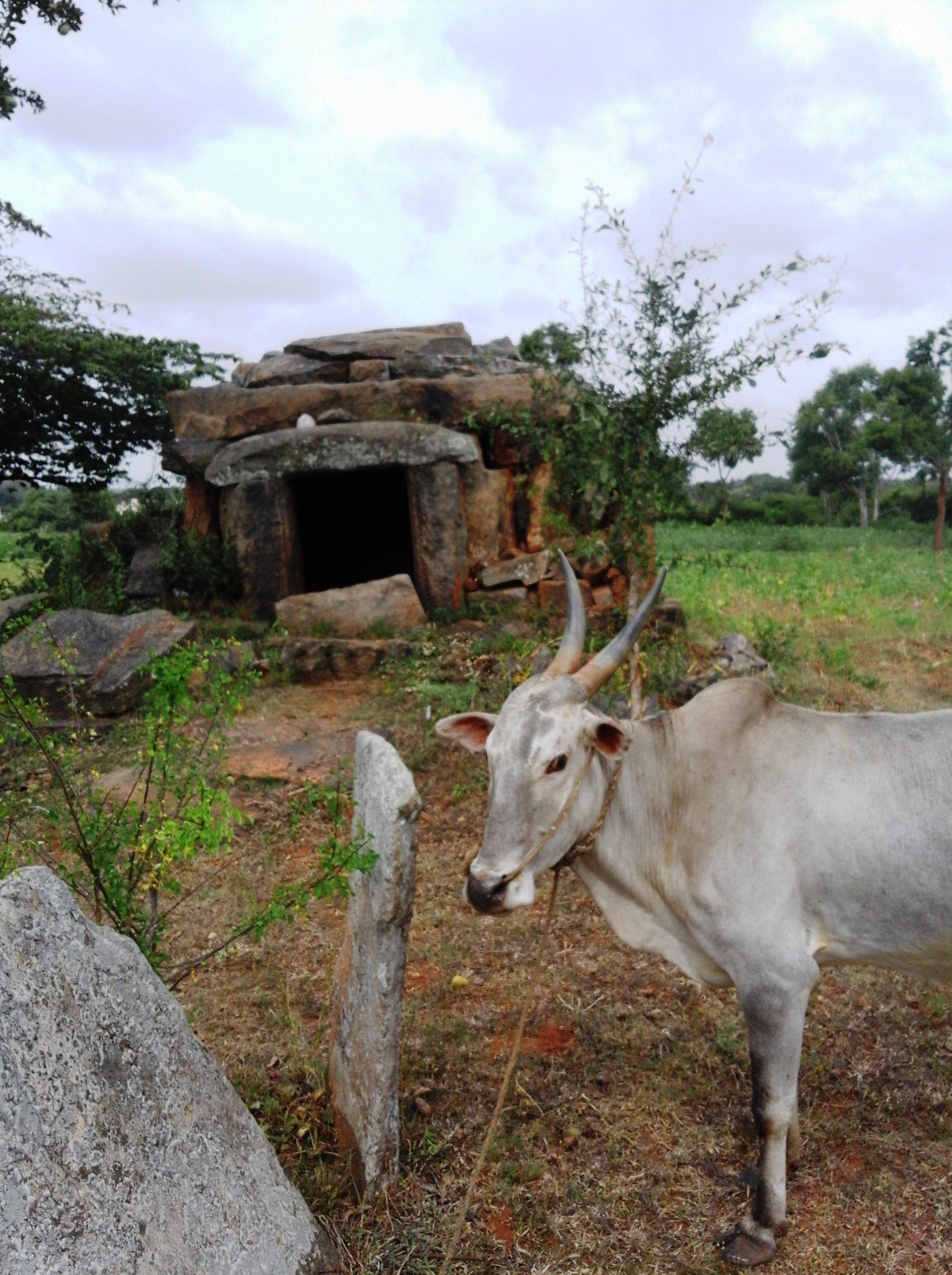
Stone temple at K.R.Puram, Kavalande

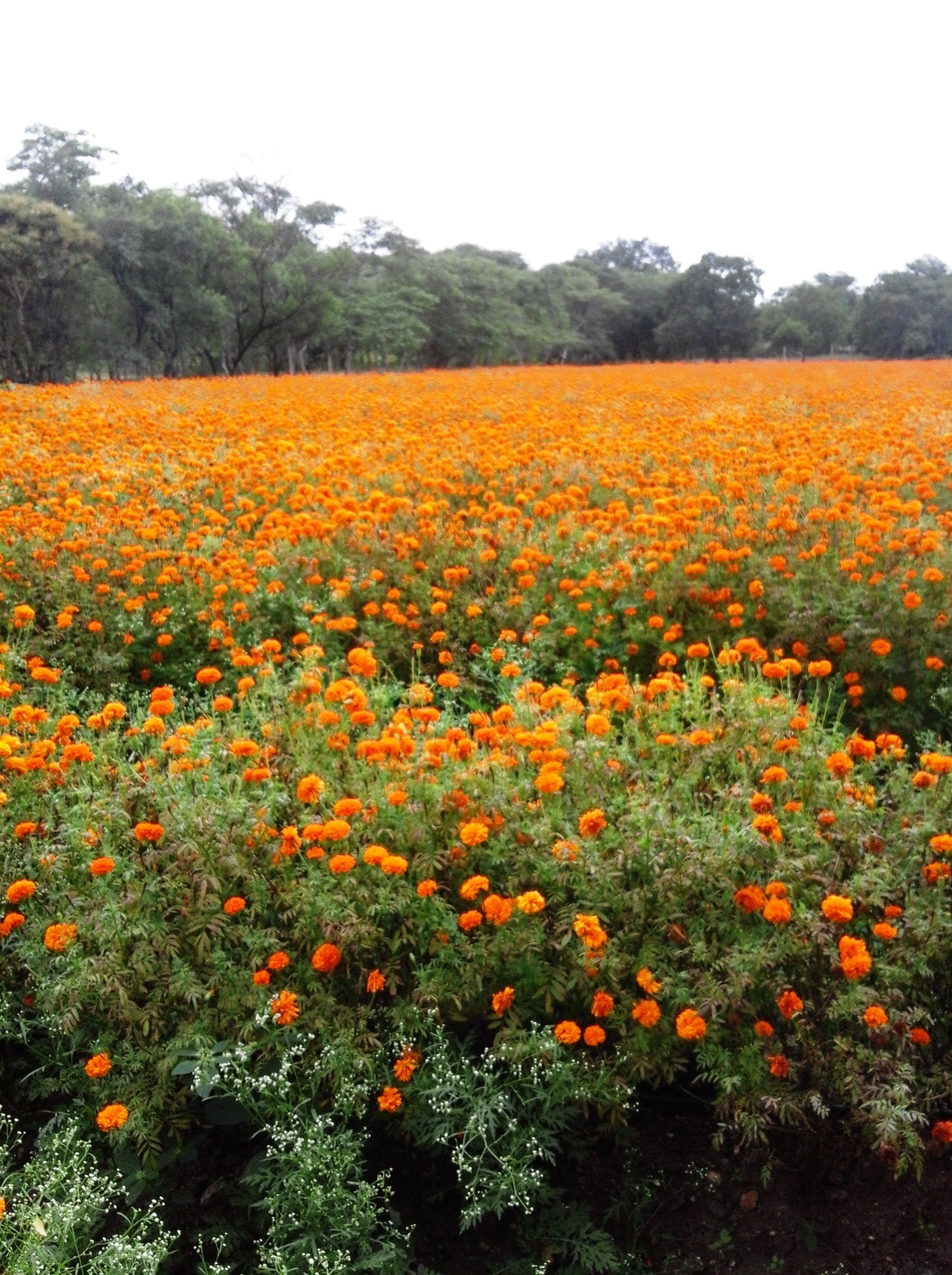
Flower farm in Kavalande

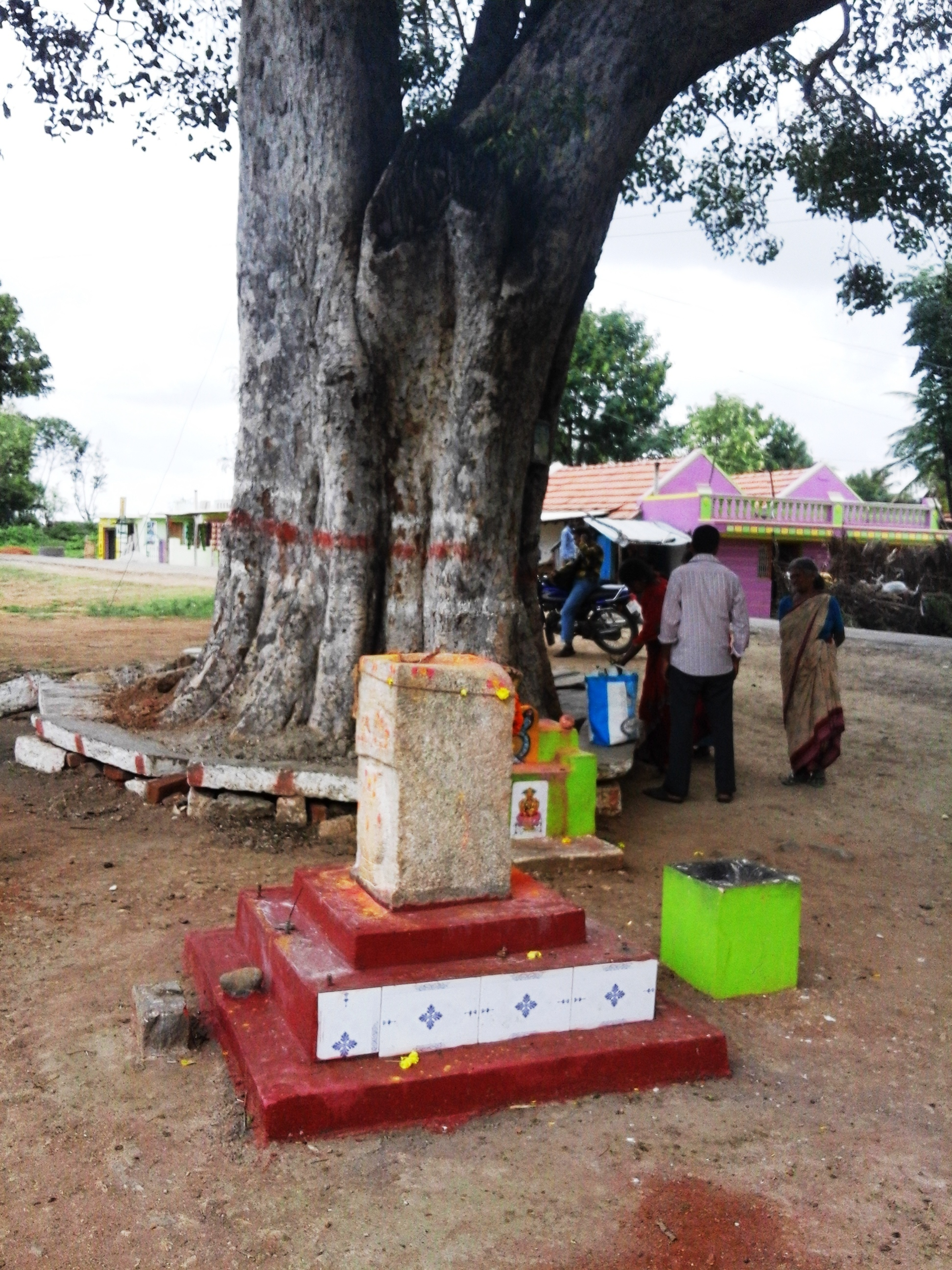
Kavalande village
