= Garudadri Express =

Overview
- Service type: Express
- Current operator: South Central Railway zone

Route
- Termini: Chennai Central (MAS); Tirupati (TPTY)
- Stops: 6
- Distance travelled: 147 km (91 mi)
- Average journey time: 3h 35m
- Service frequency: Daily (Note: Runs seven days in a week for every direction.)
- Train number: 16203/16204

On-board services
- Classes: AC First, AC 2 Tier, AC 3 Tier, Sleeper class, Second Sitting, General Unreserved.
- Seating arrangements: No
- Sleeping arrangements: Yes
- Catering facilities: On-board catering E-catering
- Observation facilities: ICF coach
- Entertainment facilities: No
- Baggage facilities: No
- Other facilities: Below the seats

Technical
- Rolling stock: 2
- Track gauge: 1,676 mm (5 ft 6 in)
- Operating speed: 41 km/h (25 mph), including halts

The Garudadri Express is an Express train belonging to South Central Railway zone that runs between Chennai Central and Tirupati in India. But the rakes was maintained by South Western Railway. It is currently being operated with 16203/16204 train numbers on a daily basis.

== Service ==
The 16203/Garudadri Express has an average speed of 41 km/h and covers 147 km in 3h 35m. The 16204/Garudadri Express has an average speed of 37 km/h and covers 147 km in 4h.

== Route and halts ==
The important halts of the train are:

- Chennai Central
- Perambur
- Tiruvallur
- Arakkonam Junction
- Tiruttani
- Nagari
- Ekambarakuppam
- Puttur
- Renigunta Junction
- Tirupati

== Coach composition ==
The train has standard ICF rakes with a maximum speed of 110 km/h. The train consists of 18 coaches:

- 1 AC First Class
- 1 AC Two Tier
- 2 AC Three Tier
- 8 Sleeper coaches
- 4 General Unreserved
- 2 Seating cum Luggage Rake

== Traction ==
Both trains are hauled by an Arakkonam Loco Shed-based WAP - 4 electric locomotive from Chennai to Renigunta then to Tirupati and vice versa.

== Direction reversal ==
The train reverses its direction 1 times:

- Renigunta Junction

== Rake sharing ==
The train shares its rake with 16219/16220- Chamarajanagar–Tirupati Express.

== See also ==
- Tirupati railway station
- Chennai Central railway station
- Sapthagiri Express
- Chamarajanagar–Tirupati Express
