= Kellamballi =

Village in Karnataka, India

Coordinates: 11.975543°N 76.904253°E

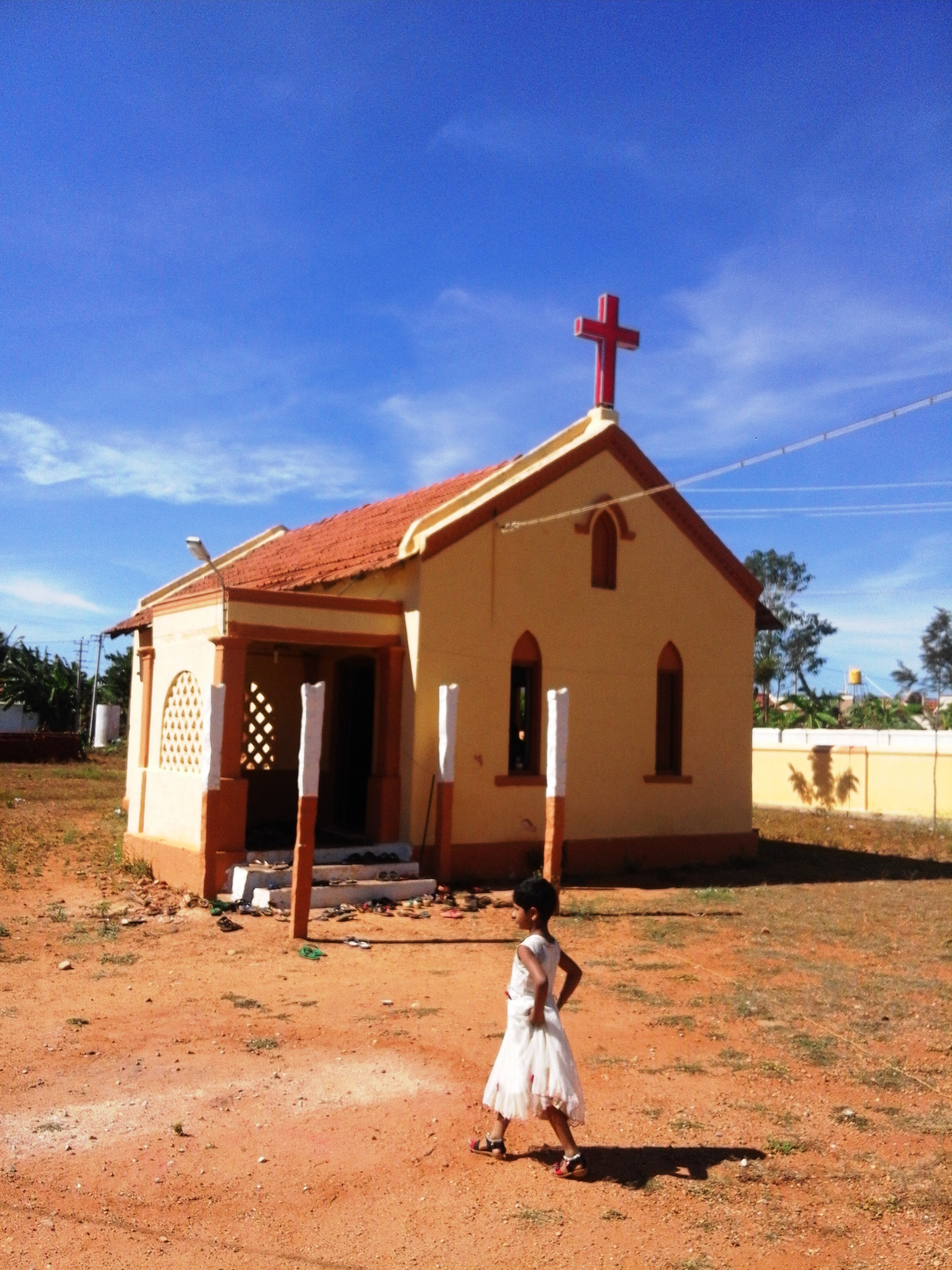
Kellamballi church

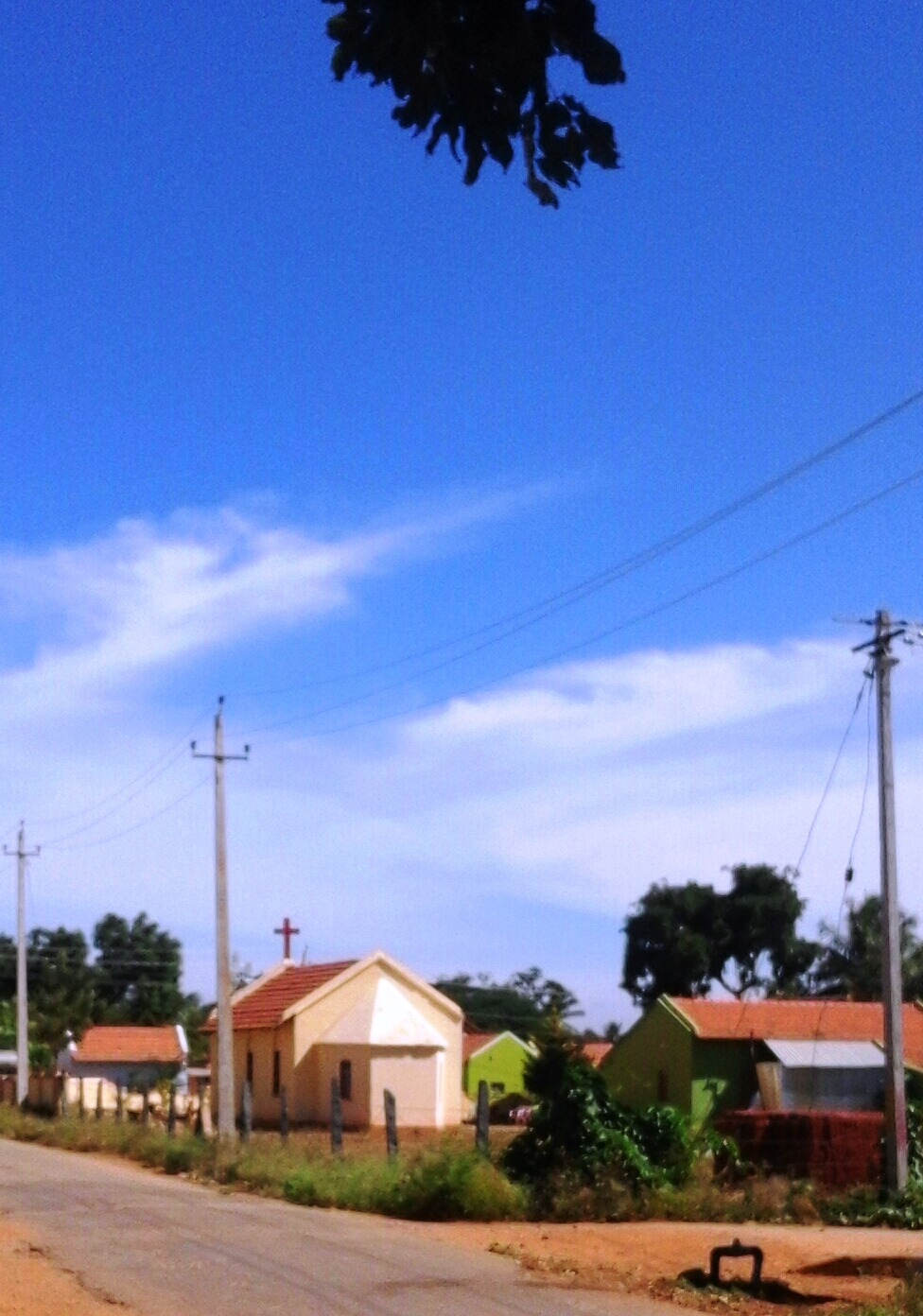
Kellamballi village

Kellamballi (kallahalli) is a small village in Chamarajanagar district of Karnataka state, India.

== Location ==
Kellamballi is located between Chamarajanagar town on Chamarajanagar main road. Kellamballi is at a distance of seven kilometers from Chamarajanagar town.

== Access ==
Kellamballi village is easily accessible from Mysore-Chamarajanagar main road. There is a railway station in the village which is called Mariyala Gangavadi railway station.

== Post office ==
There is a post office (Zilla Adalitha Bhavan) at Kellamballi village and the postal code is 571313.

== Demographics ==
The people of Kellamballi are chiefly agrarian. A few work in government establishments in Chamarajanagar town. The population of the village is 2,342 living in 513 houses. The area of the village is 1060 hectares.

== Economy ==
The provincial government has started a Rs.400 crore project on 1,595 acres of land called Badanaguppe-Kellamballi Industrial Estate which will include sectors like automobile, food processing, textiles, leather, granite and agriculture related industries.

== Education ==
- Kellamballi School
- Kallahalli School
- Murukaraj First Grade College

== Places of worship ==
There is a prominent Hindu ashram called Murukaraj Matt near to this village called Mariyala. There is also a Small church of CSI Protestant Christian is in the middle of the village square.

== See also ==
- Badanaguppe
- Mariyala
- Chamarajanagar
- Mariyala Gangavadi railway station
- Kasthuru
- Mysore–Chamarajanagar branch line

== Image gallery ==
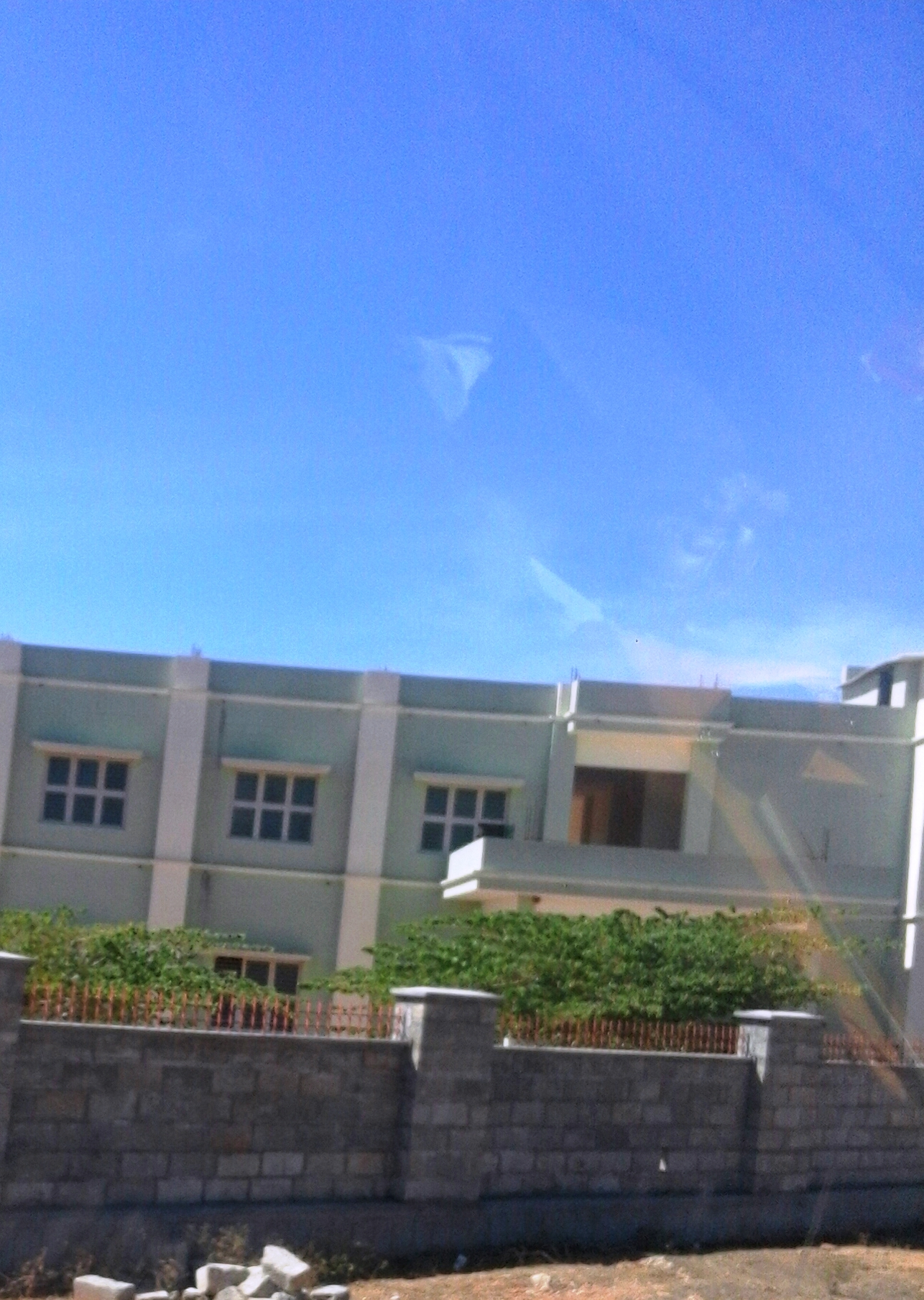
Murukaraj College

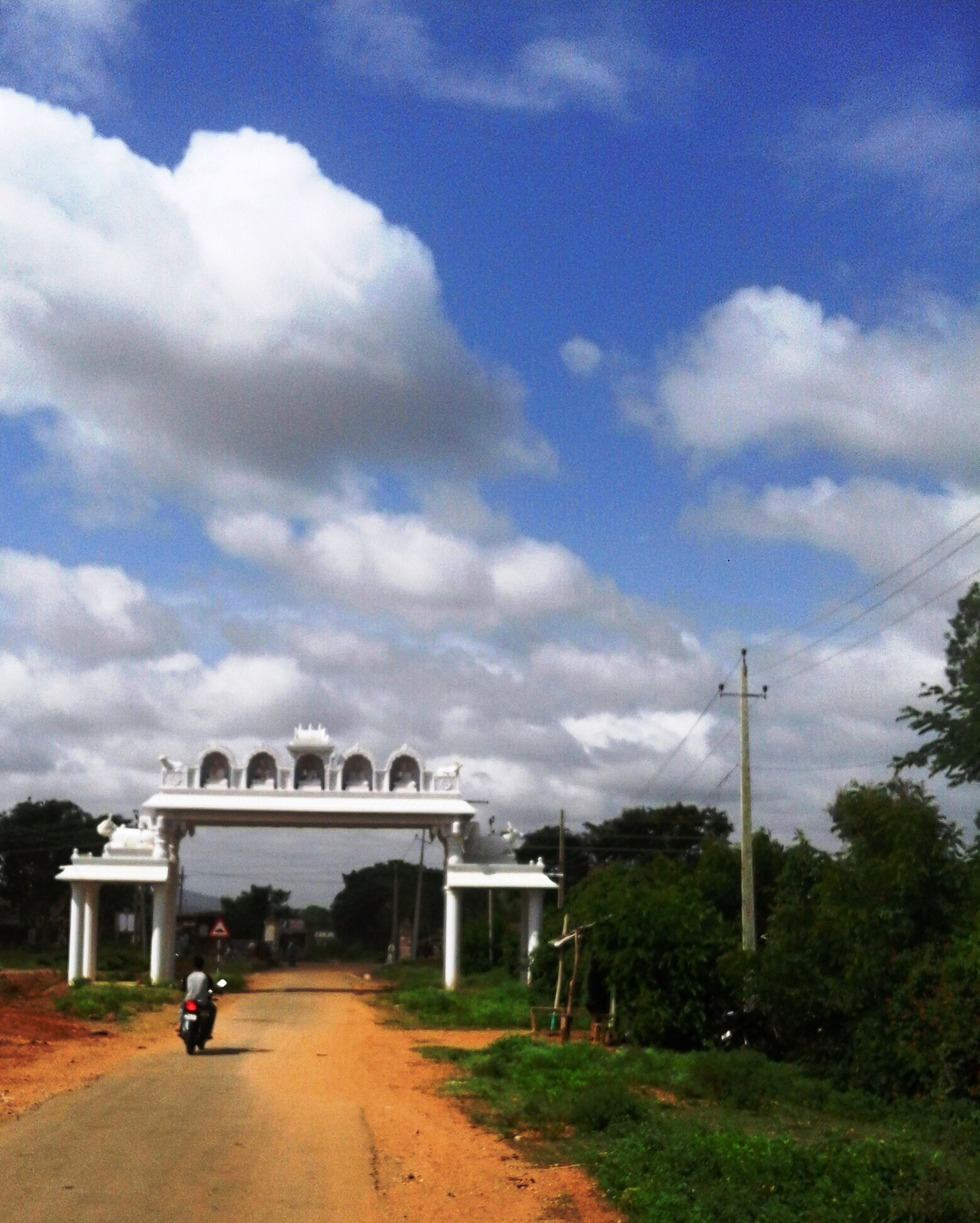
Village arch
