= Anandapuram railway station =

Railway station in Karnataka, India

Anandapuram

General information
- Location: Shimoga district, Karnataka; India
- Coordinates: 14.0747°N 75.2097°E
- Elevation: 647 metres (2,123 ft)
- System: Indian Railways station
- Platforms: 2
- Tracks: 2

Construction
- Structure type: Standard (on ground station)

Other information
- Status: Functioning
- Station code: ANF
- Zone(s): South Western Railway
- Division(s): Mysore

Services
Preceding station	Indian Railways	Following station
Kenchanala Halt towards ?	Bangalore–Arsikere–Hubli line Birur–Talaguppa	Adderi towards ?
Route map
Location
- Location within India Location within Karnataka

Anandapuram is a railway station on Birur–Talaguppa branch line of Bangalore–Arsikere–Hubli line. It is located in Shimoga district, Karnataka state, India. The station consists of two platforms, which are not well sheltered. It lacks many facilities including water and sanitation.

== Location ==
Anandapuram railway station serves Anandapuram village in Shimoga district. It pertains to Mysore railway division, part of South Western Railway zone of Indian Railways.

== Services ==
There are several trains to Mysore, Talaguppa, Bengaluru and Shimoga that stop at Anandapuram:

Number	Train Name
16205 / 16206	Talaguppa–Mysore Intercity Express
16227 / 16228	Mysore–Talaguppa Express
20651 / 20652	Bangalore City–Talaguppa Intercity Express
56217 / 56218	Talaguppa–Shivamogga Town Passenger (unreserved)
56275 / 56276	Talaguppa–Mysuru Passenger (unreserved)
