= Achooranam, Vythiri =

Achooranam
- village
- Location in Kerala, India Achooranam (India)
- Coordinates: 11.5842900°N 76.000120°E
- Country: India
- State: Kerala
- District: Wayanad

Population (2011)
  - Total: 11,998

Languages
  - Official: Malayalam, English
- Time zone: UTC+5:30 (IST)
- PIN: 6XXXXX
- Vehicle registration: KL-

Achooranam is a village near Pozhuthana, Vythiri in Wayanad district in the state of Kerala, India.

== Demographics ==
As of 2011 India census, Achooranam had a population of 11,998, with 5,753 males and 6,245 females.

== Transportation ==
Achooram is 70 km (43 mi) by road from Kozhikode railway station and this road includes nine hairpin bends. The nearest major airport is at Calicut. The road to the east connects to Mysore and Bangalore. Night journey is allowed on this sector as it goes through Bandipur National Forest. The nearest railway station is Mysore. There are airports at Bangalore and Calicut.
