= Chamarajanagar–Tirupati Express =

Train in India

Chamrajnagar–Tirupati Express
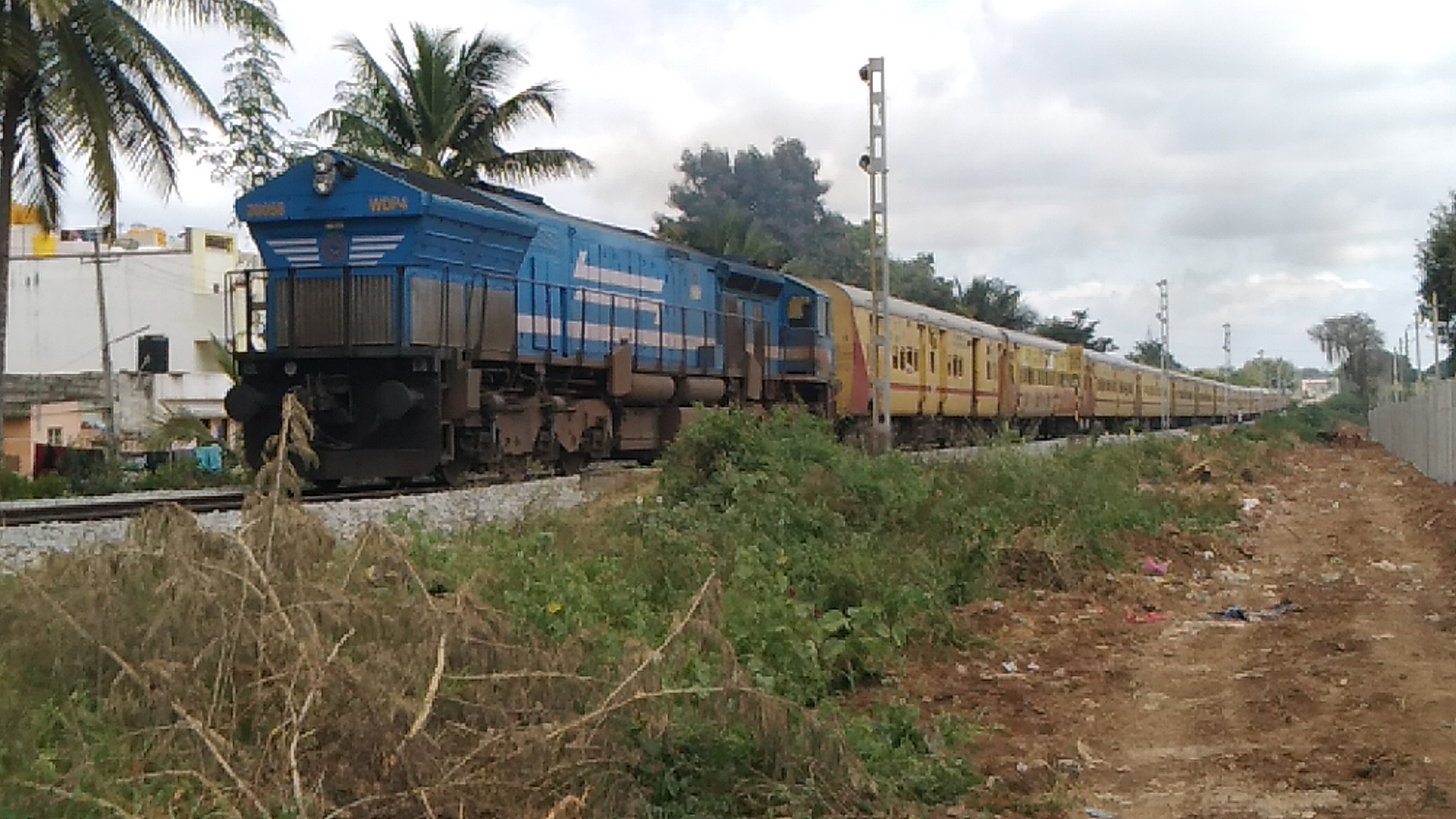

Overview
- Service type: Express
- First service: 1992
- Current operator: South Western Railway zone

Route
- Termini: Chamarajanagar (CMNR); Tirupati (TPTY)
- Stops: 28
- Distance travelled: 533 km (331 mi)
- Average journey time: 14h 15m
- Service frequency: Daily (Note: Runs seven days in a week for every direction.)
- Train number: 16219/16220

On-board services
- Classes: 1st AC, AC 2TIER, AC 3 TIER, Sleeper class, General Unreserved
- Seating arrangements: No
- Sleeping arrangements: Yes
- Catering facilities: On-board catering E-catering
- Observation facilities: ICF coach
- Entertainment facilities: No
- Baggage facilities: No
- Other facilities: Below the seats

Technical
- Rolling stock: 2
- Track gauge: 1,676 mm (5 ft 6 in)
- Operating speed: 42 km/h (26 mph), including halts

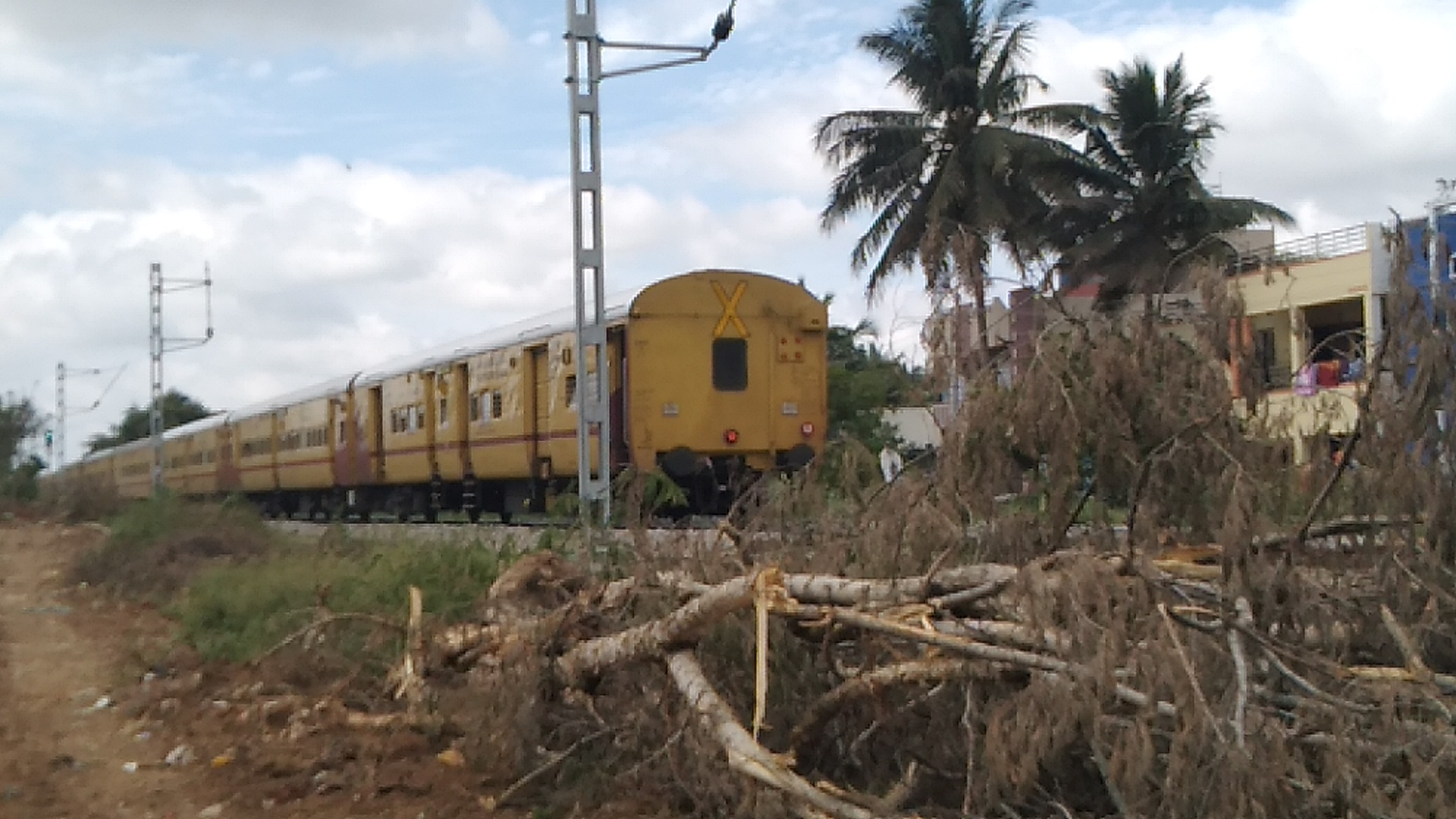
Tirupati Mysore Chamarajnagar Express at JP Nagar, Mysore

The Chamarajanagar–Tirupati Express is an Express train belonging to South Western Railway zone that runs between Chamarajanagar and Tirupati in India. It is currently being operated with 16219/16220 train numbers on a daily basis.

Earlier, since inauguration in 1992, this train was Mysuru–Tirupati Fast Passenger with train number 6213/6214, In 2008 train was extended till Chamarajanagara to run as Chamarajanagar–Tirupati Fast Passenger (56213/56214) and was converted into an express service with change in the train number on 22 August 2017.

== Service ==
- The 16219/Chamarajanagar–Tirupati Express has an average speed of 42 km/h and covers 533 km in 12h 40m.
- The 16220/Tirupati–Chamarajanagar Express has an average speed of 47 km/h and covers 533 km in 11h 15m .

== Route and halts ==
The important halts of the train are:

- Chamarajanagar
- Nanjangud Town
- Mysore Junction
- Mandya
- Kengeri
- Bangalore City
- Bangalore Cantonment
- Krishnarajapuram
- Whitefield
- Bangarapet Junction
- Jolarpettai Junction
- Katpadi Junction
- Chittoor
- Pakala Junction
- Tirupati Main

== Coach composition ==
The train has standard ICF rakes with a maximum speed of 110 km/h. The train consists of 21 coaches:

- 1 First AC
- 1 AC 2TIER
- 2 AC 3TIER
- 11 Sleeper coaches
- 4 General
- 2 Second-class Luggage/parcel van

Loco	1	2	3	4	5	6	7	8	9	10	11	12	13	14	15	16	17	18	19	20	21
	SLR	GEN	GEN	H1	A1	B1	B2	S1	S2	S3	S4	S5	S6	S7	S8	S9	S10	S11	GEN	GEN	SLR

== Rake sharing ==
This train has a rake Sharing arrangement with train number 16203/16204 Chennai Central - Tirupati Garudadri Express

== Traction ==
Both trains are hauled by an Krishnarajapuram Loco Shed-based WDP-4 WDP-4D diesel locomotive from Chamrajnagar to Mysore. From Mysore train is hauled by an Arakkonam Loco Shed-based WAP-4 electric locomotive to Tirupati and vice versa.

== Schedule ==
Train runs daily for both the side.

Train number	Station code	Departure station name	Departure time	Arrival station	Arrival time
16219	CMNR	Chamarajanagar	3:30 PM	Tirupati	3:40 AM next day
16220	TPTY	Tirupati	9:55 PM	Chamarajanagar	09:10 AM next day

== See also ==
- Chamarajanagar railway station
- Tirupati Main railway station
