= Sujathapuram railway station =

Railway station in Karnataka, India

Sujathapuram
- Sujathapuram Railway Workshop

General information
- Location: Mysore District, Karnataka; India
- Coordinates: 12.13602°N 76.67437°E
- Elevation: 760 m (2,490 ft)
- System: Indian Railways station
- Platforms: 2

Construction
- Structure type: Standard (on ground station)
- Parking: Yes

Other information
- Status: Functioning
- Station code: SJPM
- Zone(s): South Western Railway
- Division(s): Mysore

History
- Opened: 2008
Route map
Location

Sujathapuram is a railway station on Mysore–Chamarajanagar branch line. The station is located in Mysore district, Karnataka state, India.

== Location ==
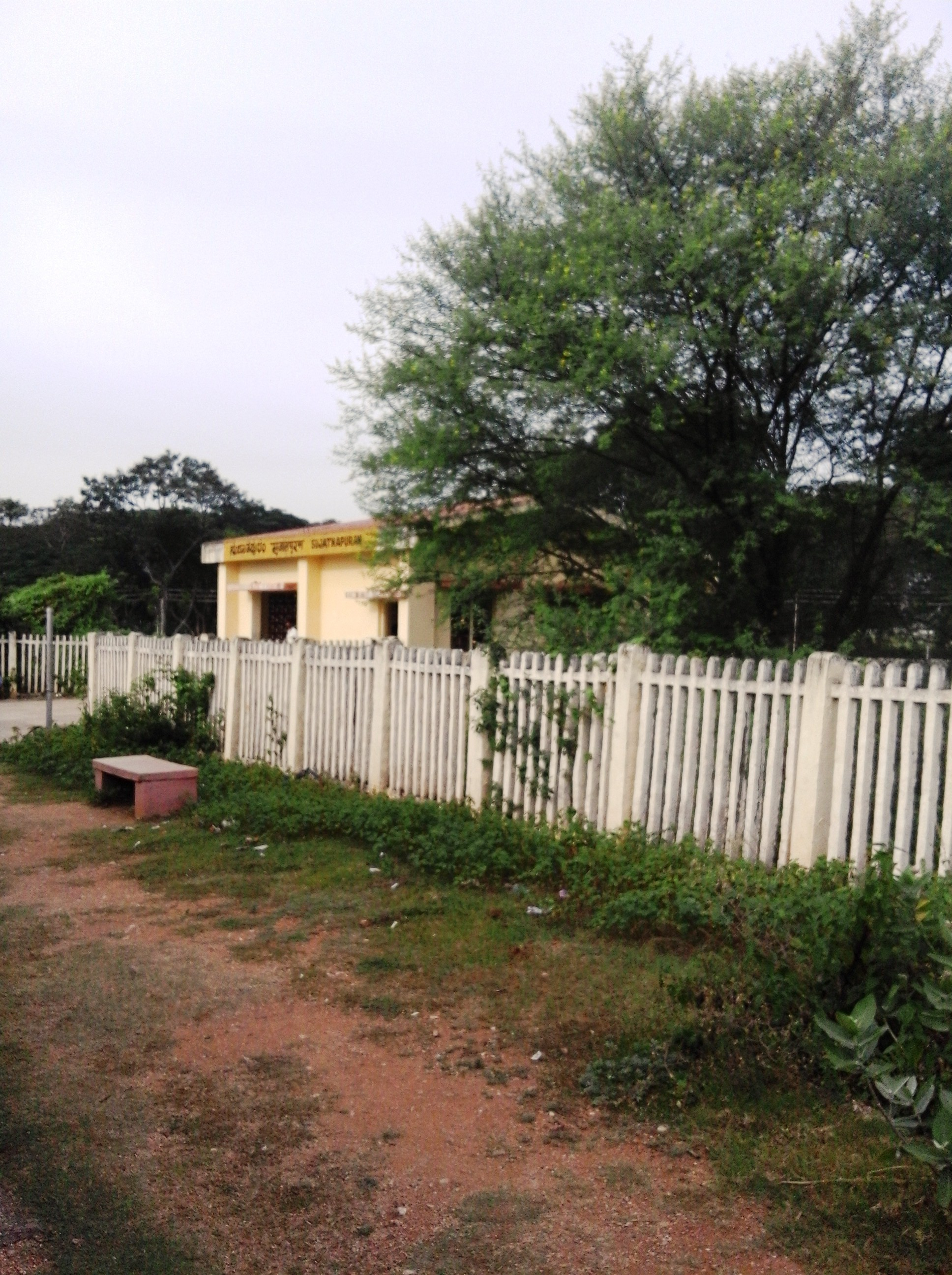
Platform

Sujathapuram railway station is located near Nanjangud town in Mysore district.

== History ==
The project cost ₹313 crore (US$33 million). The gauge conversion work of the 61 kilometres (38 mi) stretch was completed. There are six trains running forward and backward in this route. Five of them are slow moving passenger trains.
