= Chinnadagudihundi railway station =

Railway station in Karnataka, India

Chinnadagudihundi
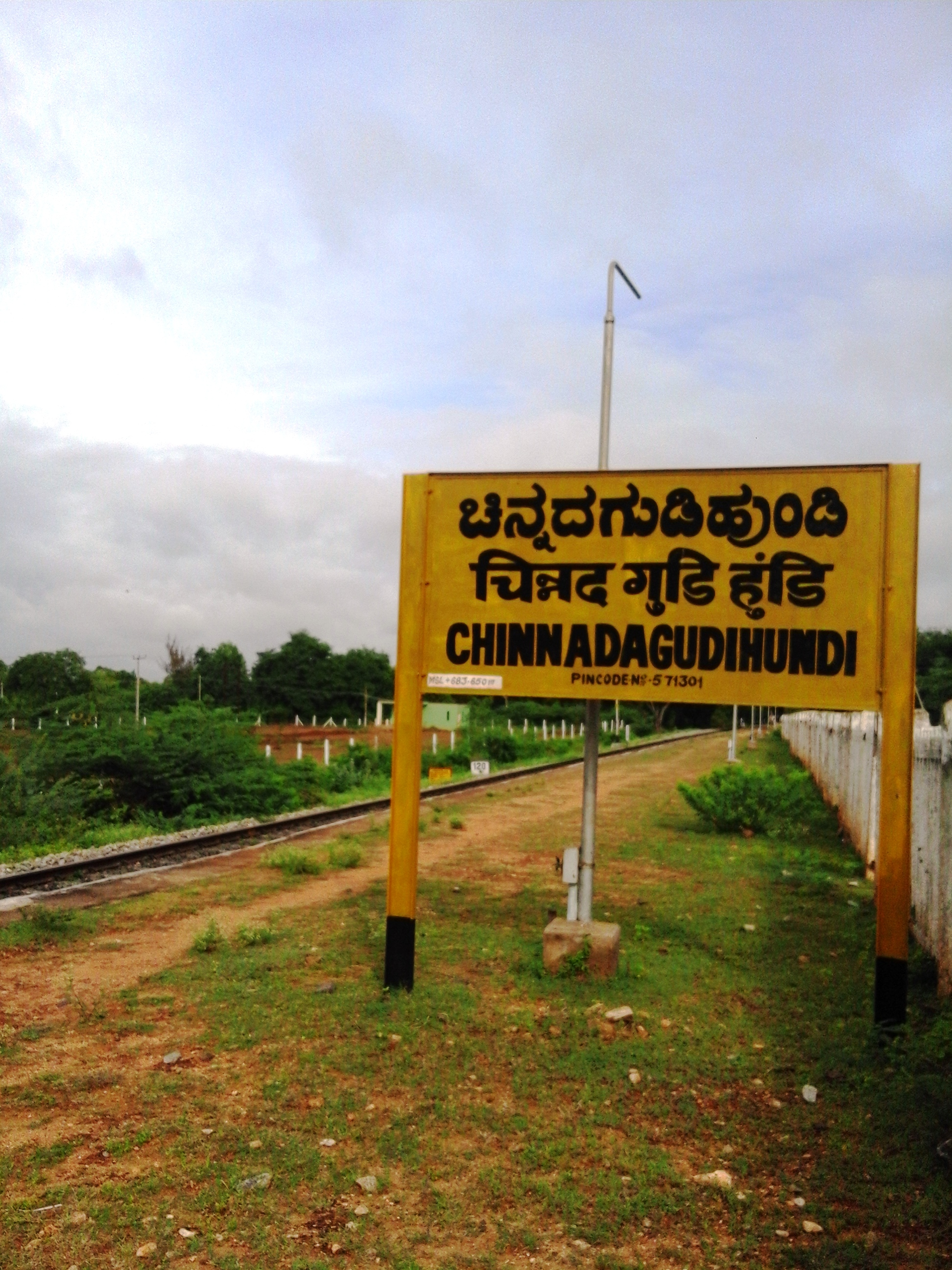
- Chinnadagudihundi Railway Workshop

General information
- Location: Mysore District, Karnataka; India
- Coordinates: 12.084143°N 76.732221°E
- Elevation: 760 m (2,490 ft)
- System: Indian Railways station
- Platforms: 2

Construction
- Structure type: Standard (on-ground station)
- Parking: Yes

Other information
- Status: Functioning
- Station code: CGHD
- Zone(s): South Western Railway
- Division(s): Mysore

History
- Opened: 2008
Location

Chinnadagudihundi is a railway station on Mysore–Chamarajanagar branch line. The station is located in Mysore district, Karnataka state, India.

== Location ==
Chinnadagudihundi railway station is located near Chinnadagudihundi village in Mysore district.

== History ==
The project cost ₹313 crore (US$33 million). The gauge conversion work of the 61 kilometres (38 mi) stretch was completed. whether he has received any representation regarding the reopening of the way side halt at Chinnadagudihundi on Mysore-Chamarajanagar Section in Mysore Division, Southern Railway. In 1958 this matter is under examined There are six trains running forward and backward in this route. Five of them are slow-moving Passenger trains.
