= Kadakola railway station =

Railway station in Karnataka, India

Kadakolu
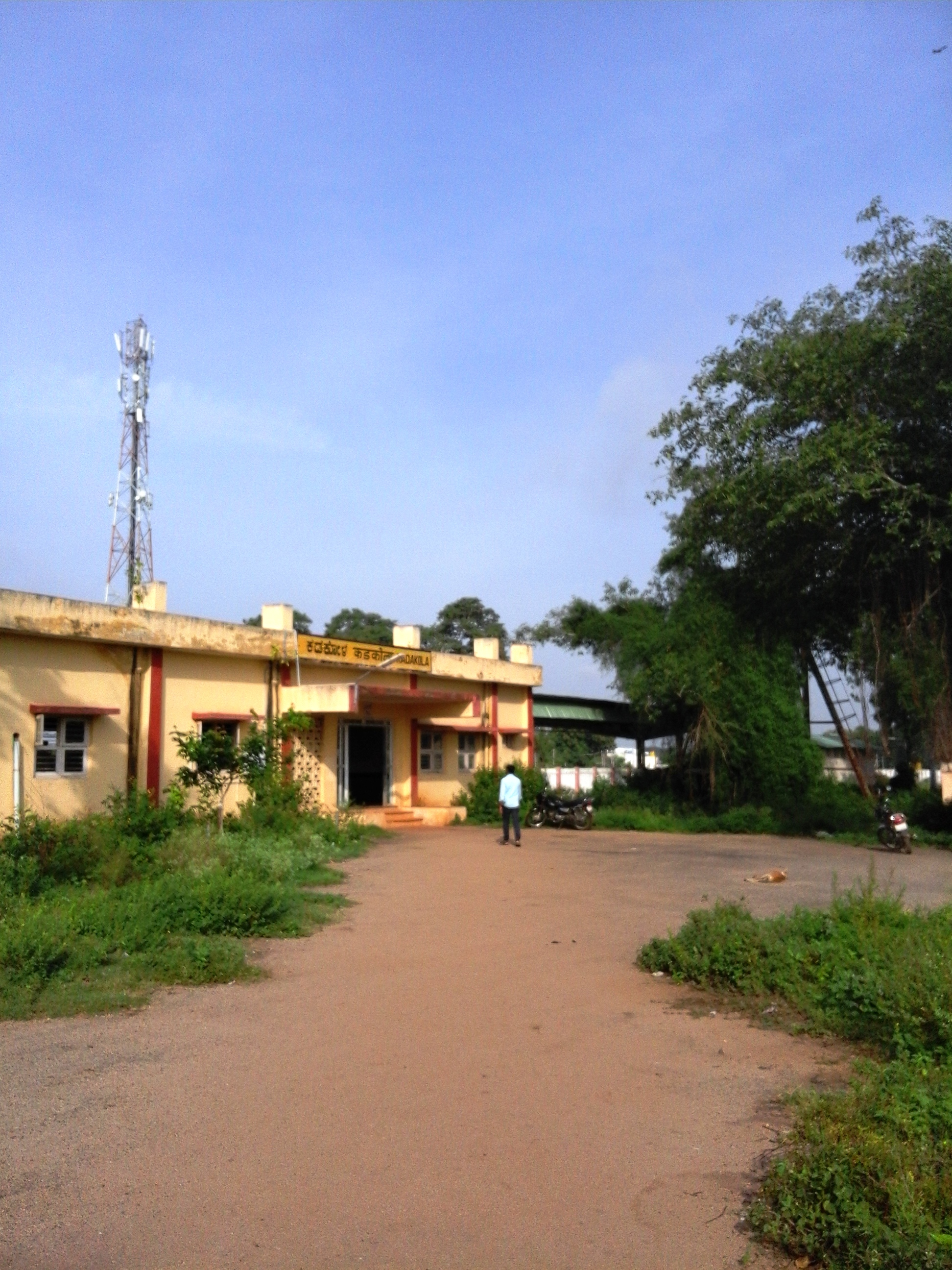
- Kadakola Railway Workshop

General information
- Location: Mysore District, Karnataka; India
- Coordinates: 12.19088°N 76.66371°E
- Elevation: 760 m (2,490 ft)
- System: Indian Railways station
- Platforms: 2

Construction
- Structure type: Standard (on ground station)
- Parking: Yes

Other information
- Status: Functioning
- Station code: KDO
- Zone(s): South Western Railway
- Division(s): Mysore

History
- Opened: 2008
Location

Kadakola is a railway station on Mysore–Chamarajanagar branch line. The station is located in Mysore district, Karnataka state, India.

== Location ==
Kadakola railway station is located at Kadakola town near Nanjangud in Mysore district.

== History ==
The project cost ₹313 crore (US$33 million). The gauge conversion work of the 61 kilometres (38 mi) stretch was completed. There are six trains running forward and backward in this route. Five of them are slow moving passenger trains.
