= Kunnathidavaka =

- Village
- Country: India
- State: Kerala
- District: Wayanad

Population (2011)
  - Total: 10,309

Languages
  - Official: Malayalam, English
- Time zone: UTC+5:30 (IST)
- PIN: 6XXXXX
- Vehicle registration: KL-

Kunnathidavaka is a village near Vythiri in Wayanad district in the state of Kerala, India.

== Demographics ==
As of 2011 India census, Kunnathidavaka had a population of 10,309, with 5,029 males and 5,280 females.

== Transportation ==
Kunnathidavaka is 71km by road from Kozhikode railway station. The nearest major airport is at Calicut airport, though Bangalore airport is also nearby The nearest railway station is Mysore.
