= Mariyala Gangavadi railway station =

Railway station in Karnataka, India

Mariyala–Gangawadi
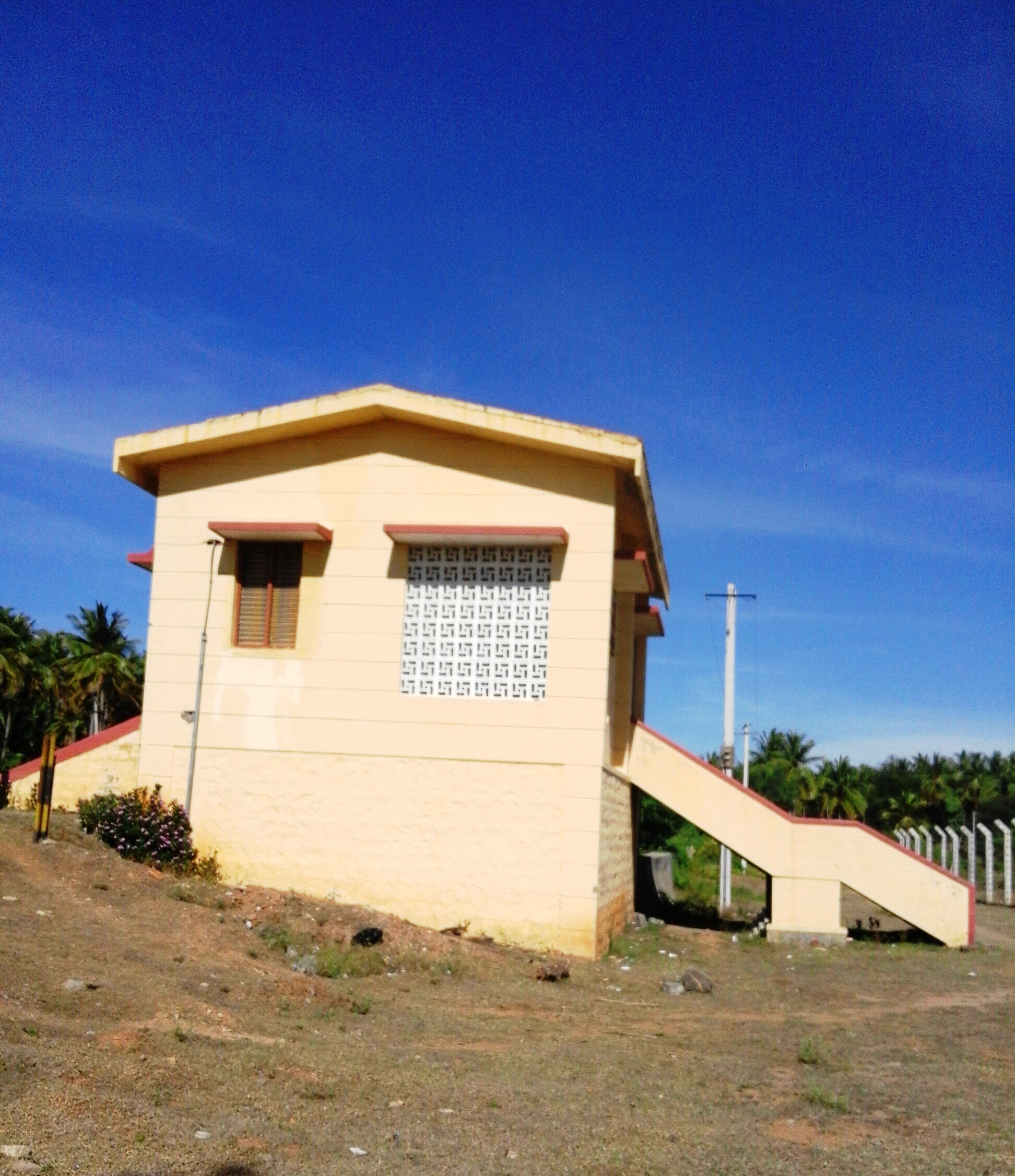
- Mariyala–Gangawadi railway station

General information
- Location: Chamarajanagara District, Karnataka; India
- Coordinates: 12.3163°N 76.6454°E
- Elevation: 760 m (2,490 ft)
- System: Indian Railways station
- Platforms: 2

Construction
- Structure type: Standard (on ground station)
- Parking: Yes

Other information
- Status: Functioning
- Station code: MRLA
- Zone(s): South Western Railway
- Division(s): Mysore

History
- Opened: 2008
Location
- Location within India Location within Karnataka

Mariyala-Gangawadi is a railway station on Mysore–Chamarajanagar branch line. The station is located in Chamarajanagara District, Karnataka state, India.

== Location ==
Mariyala-Gangavadi railway station is located near Mariyala village in Chamarajanagar district.

== History ==
The project cost ₹313 crore (US$33 million). The gauge conversion work of the 61 kilometres (38 mi) stretch was completed. There are six trains running forward and backward in this route. Five of them are slow moving passenger trains.

== Image gallery ==
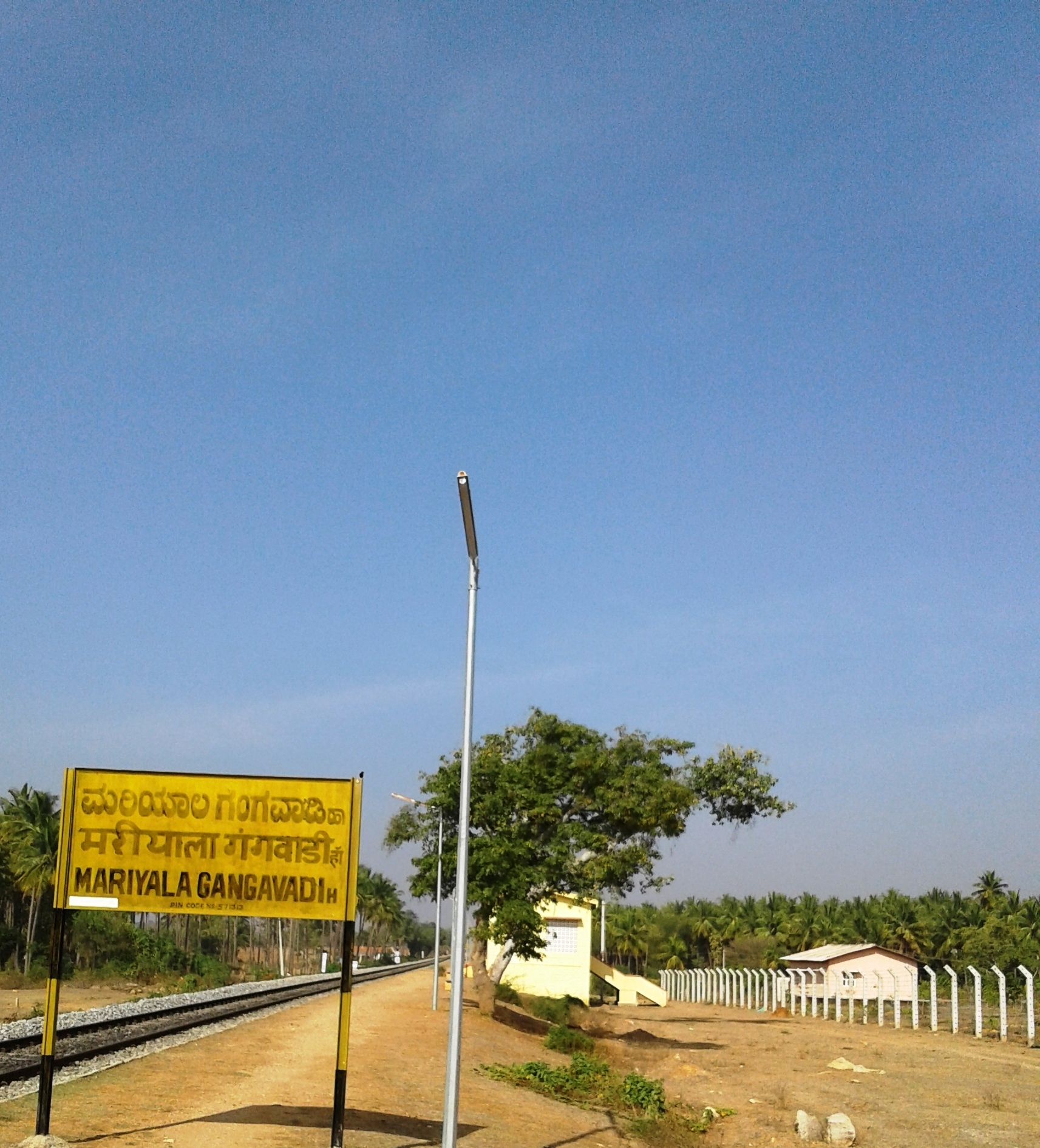
Railway station view

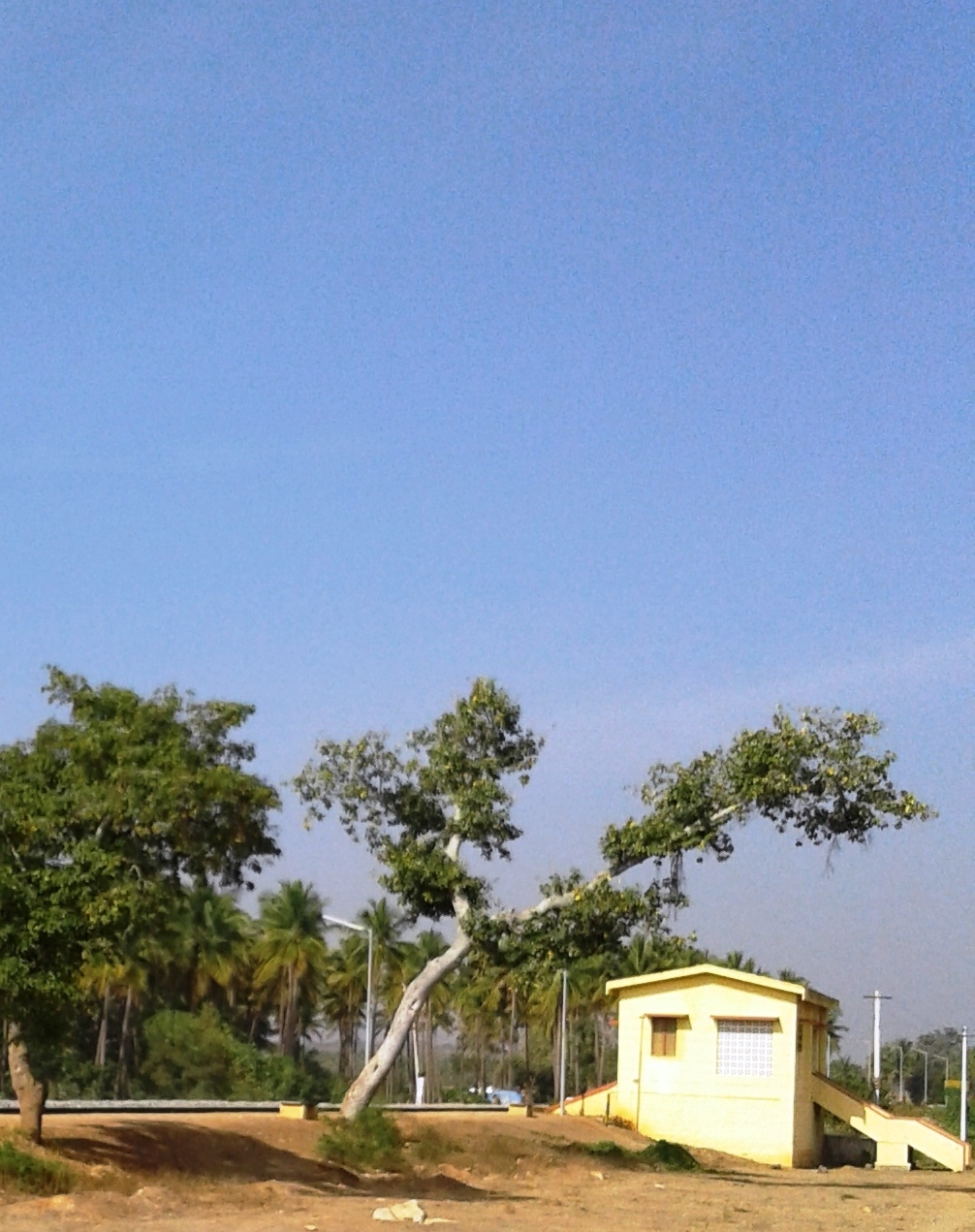
Railway station

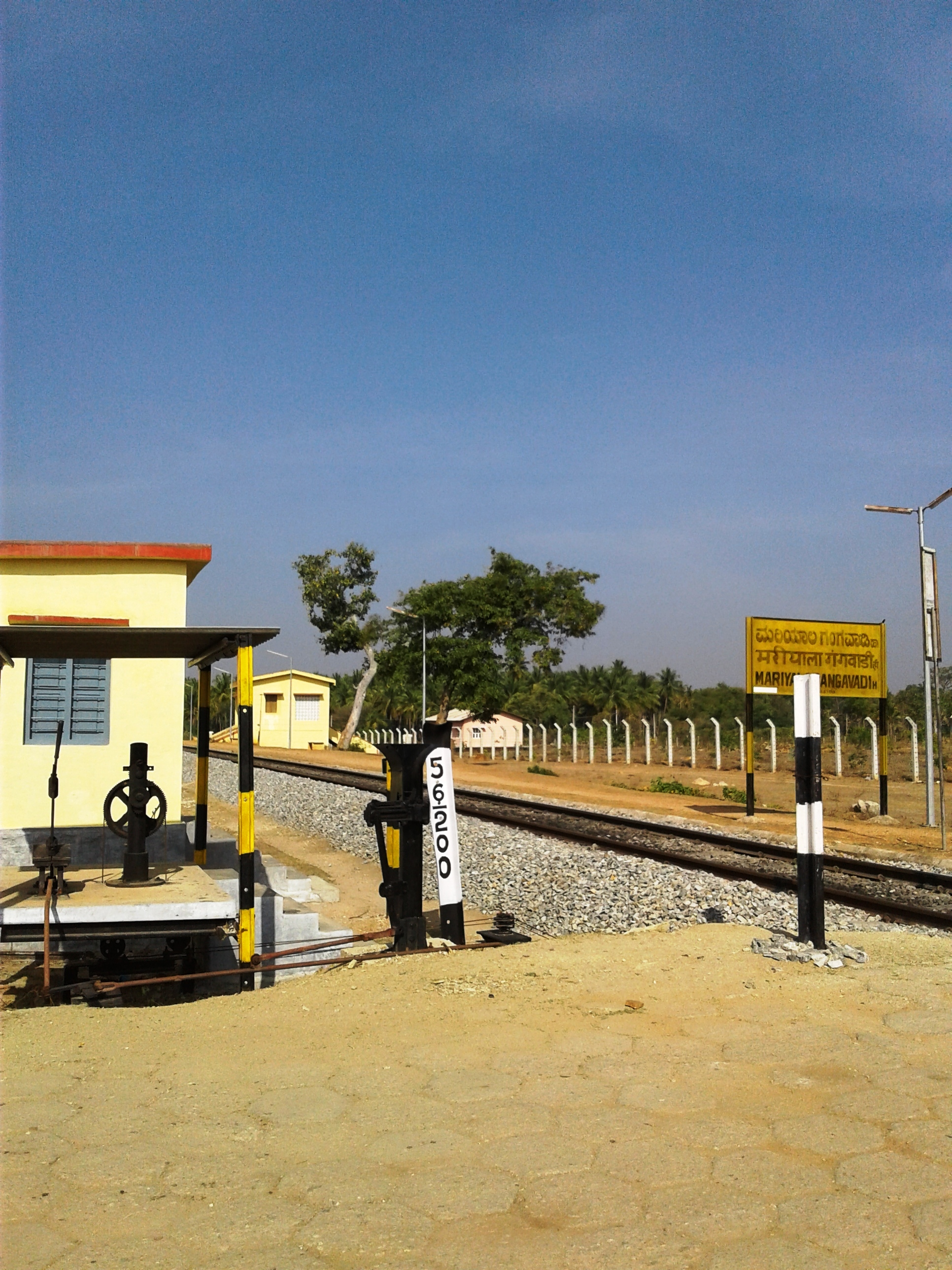
Gate of Gangavadi

== See also ==
- Badanaguppe
- Kellamballi
- Chamarajanagar
