= Malgudi Express =

Train in India

Overview
- Service type: Express
- Locale: Karnataka
- Current operator: Southern Railway

Route
- Termini: Ashokapuram (AP); KSR Bengaluru (SBC)
- Stops: 8
- Distance travelled: 143 km (89 mi)
- Average journey time: 2 hours 50 minutes
- Service frequency: Daily
- Train number: 20623 / 20624

On-board services
- Classes: AC Chair Car, General Unreserved
- Seating arrangements: Yes
- Sleeping arrangements: No
- Auto-rack arrangements: Overhead racks
- Catering facilities: On-board catering, E-catering
- Observation facilities: Rake Sharing with 16021/16022 Kaveri Express
- Baggage facilities: No
- Other facilities: Below the seats

Technical
- Rolling stock: ICF coach
- Track gauge: 1,676 mm (5 ft 6 in)
- Operating speed: 50 km/h (31 mph) average including halts.
Route map
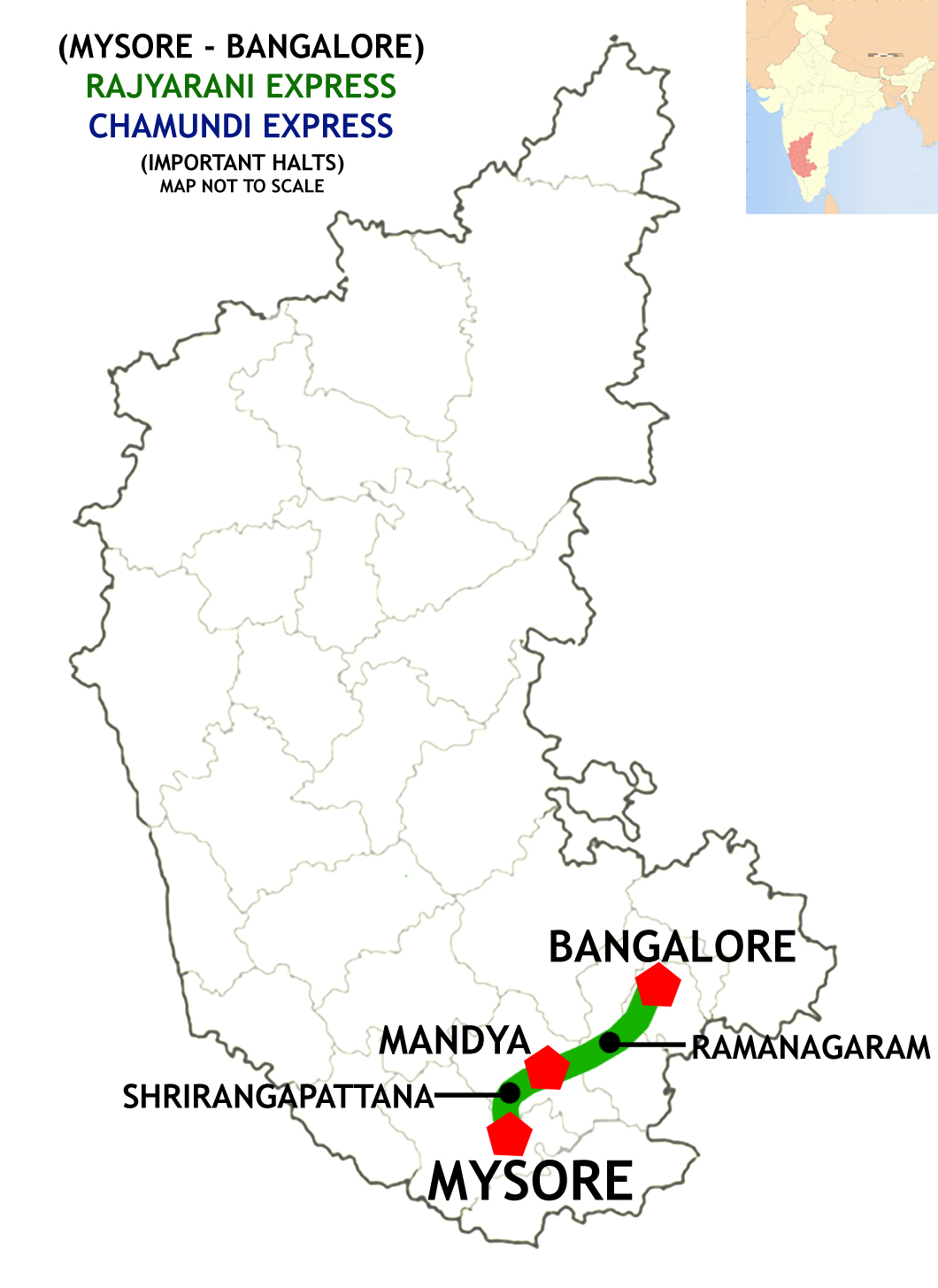

The 20623 / 20624 Malgudi Express is an express train belonging to Indian Railways – Southern Railway zone that runs between Ashokapuram and KSR Bengaluru in India.

It operates as train number 20623 from Ashokapuram to KSR Bengaluru and as train number 20624 in the reverse direction serving the state of Karnataka.

== Coaches ==
The 16023/24 Ashokapuram KSR Bengaluru Malgudi Express has 16 unreserved seats, 1 AC chair car, and 2 SLR Coaches.

== Service ==
The 20623 Ashokapuram KSR Bengaluru Malgudi Express covers the same distance of 143 km (89 mi) in 3 hours, 10 minutes (55.00 km/h) and in 3 hours, 10 minutes as 20624 KSR Bengaluru Mysore Junction Malgudi Express.

== Routing ==
The 20623 / 24 Ashokapuram KSR Bengaluru Malgudi Express runs from Ashokapuram via Mysore Junction Mandya, Maddur, Channapatna, Ramanagara to KSR Bengaluru.

== Traction ==
Both trains are hauled by a Royapuram Loco Shed or Krishnarajapuram Loco Shed based WAP-7 electric locomotive on its entire journey.
