= Sapthagiri Express =

Train in India

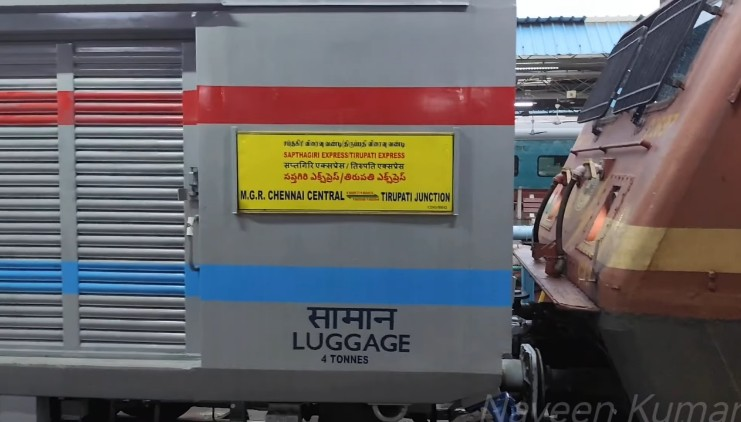

Overview
- Service type: Express
- Locale: Andhra Pradesh & Tamil Nadu
- Current operator: Southern Railway

Route
- Termini: MGR Chennai Central (MAS); Tirupati (TPTY)
- Stops: 8
- Distance travelled: 147 km (91 mi)
- Average journey time: 4 hrs 10 mins
- Service frequency: Daily
- Train number: 16057 / 16058

On-board services
- Classes: AC Chair Car, Second Class Seating, General Unreserved
- Seating arrangements: Yes
- Sleeping arrangements: No
- Auto-rack arrangements: Overhead racks
- Catering facilities: On-board catering, E-catering
- Observation facilities: Large windows
- Baggage facilities: Available
- Other facilities: Below the seats

Technical
- Rolling stock: LHB coach
- Track gauge: Broad Gauge
- Operating speed: 35 km/h (22 mph) average including halts.
Route map
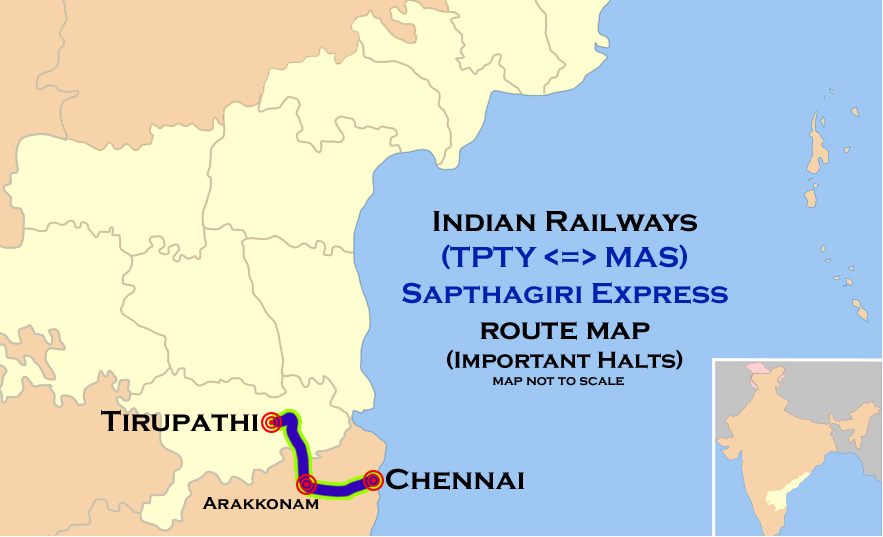

The 16057 / 16058 The Sapthagiri Express is an Express train, operated between Chennai Central and Tirupati Main. The train was nostalgic among the millennium generation due to the green and yellow livery of the train in its past.

== Traction ==
earlier was WAM-4 then WAP-7 for first time in 2018. It is regularly hauled by an Erode Loco Shed or Arakkonam Loco Shed-based WAP-4 electric locomotive from end to end.

== Halts ==
★Train No. 16057 departs MGR Chennai Central at 06.25 hours and stops at Ambattur, Tiruvallur, Arakkonam Junction, Tiruttani, Ekambarakuppam, Puttur and Renigunta Junction to reach Tirupati at 09 hours 50 minutes

★Train no 16058 departs Tirupati at 18.00 hours to reach MGR Chennai Central at 22.15 hours. Enroute Chennai Central, it has additional stoppage at Perambur

== Rake sharing ==
The train is having Rake Share Arrangement with Train Number 16054/16053 Chennai Central–Tirupati Express

== Coach composition ==
earlier was Running with DEMU coaches in last decades then in 2018 was ICF CBC Rake comprises, now it gets an LHB Blue livery form of Shatabdi Express

- 01 - AC Chair Car (CC)
- 06 - Second Sitting (D coach)
- 09 - General SecondClass (GS)
- 02 - SLR.

== Direction reversal ==
★The train no 16057 coming from Chennai Central reverses at Renigunta junction to reach Tirupati Main via Tiruchanur

★The train no 16058 coming from Tirupati reaches Renigunta Junction and reverses its direction of travel to reach Chennai

== See also ==
- List of named passenger trains of India
