= Chennai Central–Tirupati Express =

Train in India

Overview
- Service type: Express
- Current operator: Southern Railway zone

Route
- Termini: Chennai Central (MAS); Tirupati (TPTY)
- Stops: 6
- Distance travelled: 147 km (91 mi)
- Average journey time: 3h 25m
- Service frequency: Daily (Note: Runs seven days in a week for every direction.)
- Train number: 16053/16054

On-board services
- Class: General Unreserved
- Seating arrangements: No
- Sleeping arrangements: Yes
- Catering facilities: On-board catering E-catering
- Observation facilities: ICF coach
- Entertainment facilities: No
- Baggage facilities: No
- Other facilities: Below the seats

Technical
- Rolling stock: 2
- Track gauge: 1,676 mm (5 ft 6 in)
- Operating speed: 37 km/h (23 mph), including halts

The Chennai Central–Tirupati Express is an Express train belonging to Southern Railway zone that runs between Chennai Central and Tirupati in India. It is currently being operated with 16053/16054 train numbers on a daily basis.

== Service ==
The 16053/Chennai Central–Tirupati Express has an average speed of 43 km/h and covers 147 km in 3h 25m. The 16054/Tirupati–Chennai Central Express has an average speed of 40 km/h and covers 147 km in 3h 40m.

== Route and halts ==
The important halts of the train are:

- Chennai Central
- Tiruvallur
- Arakkonam Junction
- Tiruttani
- Ekambarakuppam
- Puttur
- Renigunta Junction
- Tirupati

== Coach composition ==
The train has standard ICF rakes with a max speed of 110 kmph. The train consists of 18 coaches:

- 1 AC Chair Car
- 7 Second Sitting
- 8 General Unreserved

== Traction ==
Both trains are hauled by an Arakkonam Loco Shed based WAG-7 or WAM-4 electric locomotive from Chennai to Tirupati and vice versa.

== Direction reversal ==
The train reverses its direction 1 times:

- Renigunta Junction

== Rake sharing ==
The train shares its rake with 16057/16058 Sapthagiri Express

== See also ==
- Tirupati railway station
- Chennai Central railway station
- Sapthagiri Express
