= Mysuru–Talaguppa Express =

Mysore–Talaguppa Express
Overview
- Service type: Express
- First service: 28 July 2017; 9 years ago
- Current operator: South Western Railway zone

Route
- Termini: Mysuru Junction (MYS); Talaguppa (TLGP)
- Stops: 29
- Distance travelled: 509 km (316 mi)
- Average journey time: 11h 30m
- Service frequency: Daily (Note: Runs seven days in a week for every direction.)
- Train number: 16227/16228

On-board services
- Classes: AC 2 tier, AC 3 tier, Sleeper class, General Unreserved
- Seating arrangements: No
- Sleeping arrangements: Yes
- Catering facilities: On-board catering E-catering
- Observation facilities: ICF coach
- Entertainment facilities: No
- Baggage facilities: No
- Other facilities: Below the seats

Technical
- Rolling stock: 2
- Track gauge: 1,676 mm (5 ft 6 in)
- Operating speed: 42 km/h (26 mph), including halts

The Mysuru–Talaguppa Express is an Express train belonging to South Western Railway zone that runs between Mysuru Junction and Talaguppa in India. It is currently being operated with 16227/16228 train numbers on a daily basis.

== Service ==
The 16227/Mysuru- Talaguppa Express has average speed of 44 km/h and covers 509 km in 11h 30m. The 16228/Talaguppa Mysuru Express has average speed of 45 km/h and covers 509 km in 11h 25m.

== Route and halts ==
The important halts of the train are:

- Mysore Junction
- Mandya
- Bangalore City
- Malleswaram
- Yesvantpur Junction
- Tumakuru
- Arsikere Junction
- Bhadravati
- Shimoga
- Shimoga Town
- Talaguppa

== Coach composition ==
The train has standard lhb rakes with a maximum speed of 110 km/h. The train consists of 22 coaches:

- 1 First AC
- 2 AC III Tier
- 10 Sleeper coaches
- 5 General Unreserved
- 2 Seating cum Luggage Rake

== Traction ==
Both trains are hauled by a Krishnarajapuram Loco Shed-based WAP-7 electric locomotive from Mysore to Talaguppa and vice versa wef 1/06/2025

== Rake sharing ==
The train shares its rake with 16219/16220 Chamarajanagar–Tirupati Express and 56206/56205 Nanjangud–Mysuru Passenger.

== See also ==
- Mysore Junction railway station
- Talaguppa railway station
- Chamarajanagar–Tirupati Fast Passenger
- Nanjangud–Mysuru Passenger
