= Ashokapuram railway station =

Railway station in Karnataka, India

Ashokapuram Ashokapura
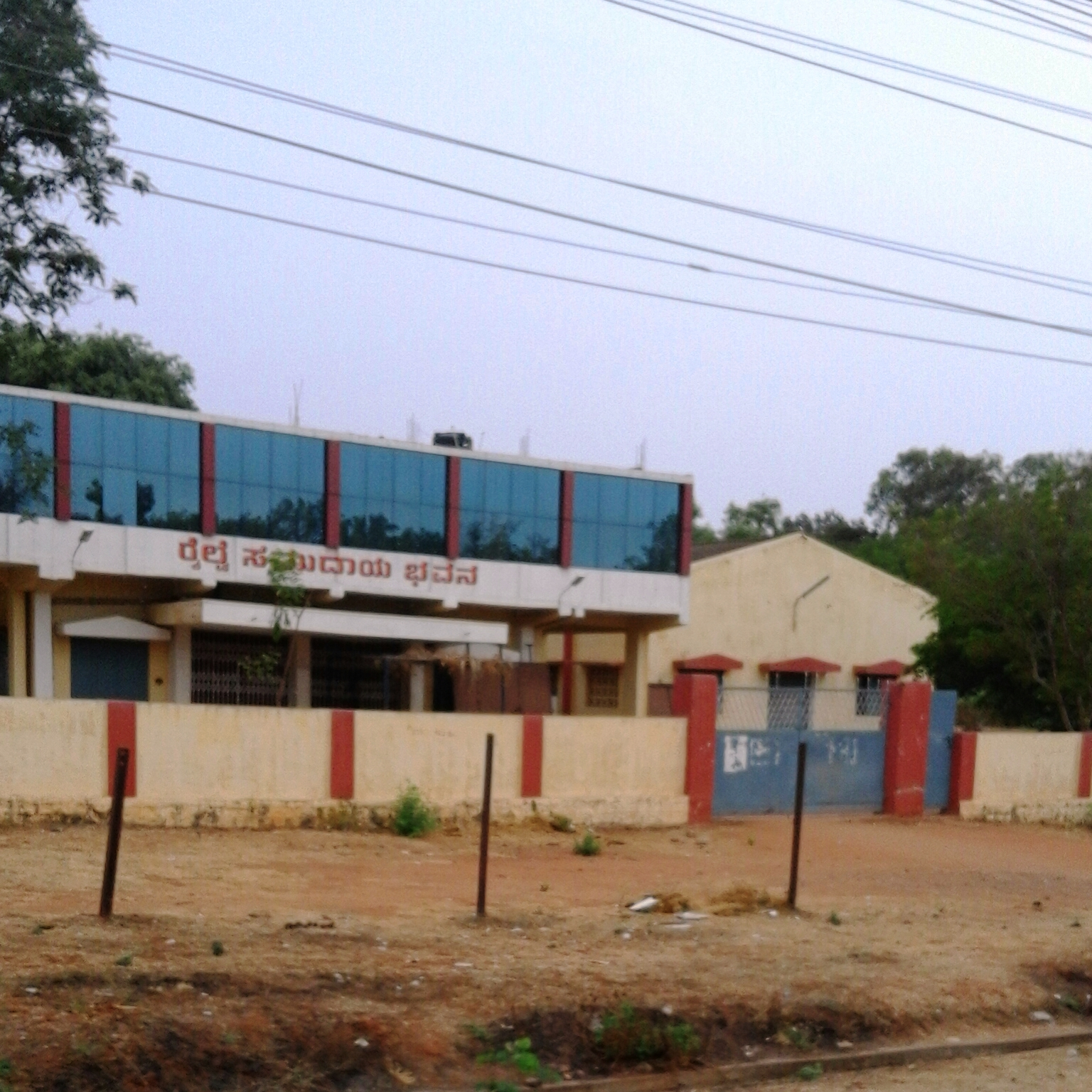
- Ashokapuram Railway Workshop

General information
- Location: Mysore District, Karnataka; India
- Coordinates: 12.2744°N 76.6358°E
- Elevation: 741 m (2,431 ft)
- System: Indian Railways station
- Platforms: 5(1 under construction )

Construction
- Structure type: Standard (on ground station)
- Parking: Yes

Other information
- Status: Functioning
- Station code: AP
- Zone(s): South Western Railway zone
- Division(s): Mysore

History
- Opened: 2008; 18 years ago
Location
- Location within India Location within Karnataka

Ashokapuram is a railway station on Mysore–Chamarajanagar branch line. The station is located in Mysore district, Karnataka state, India.

== Location ==
Ashokapuram railway station is located near J. P. Nagar in Mysore city.

== History ==
The project cost ₹313 crore (US$33 million). The gauge conversion work of the 61 kilometres (38 mi) stretch was completed. There are six trains running forward and backward in this route. Five of them are slow-moving passenger trains.
