= Mariyala =

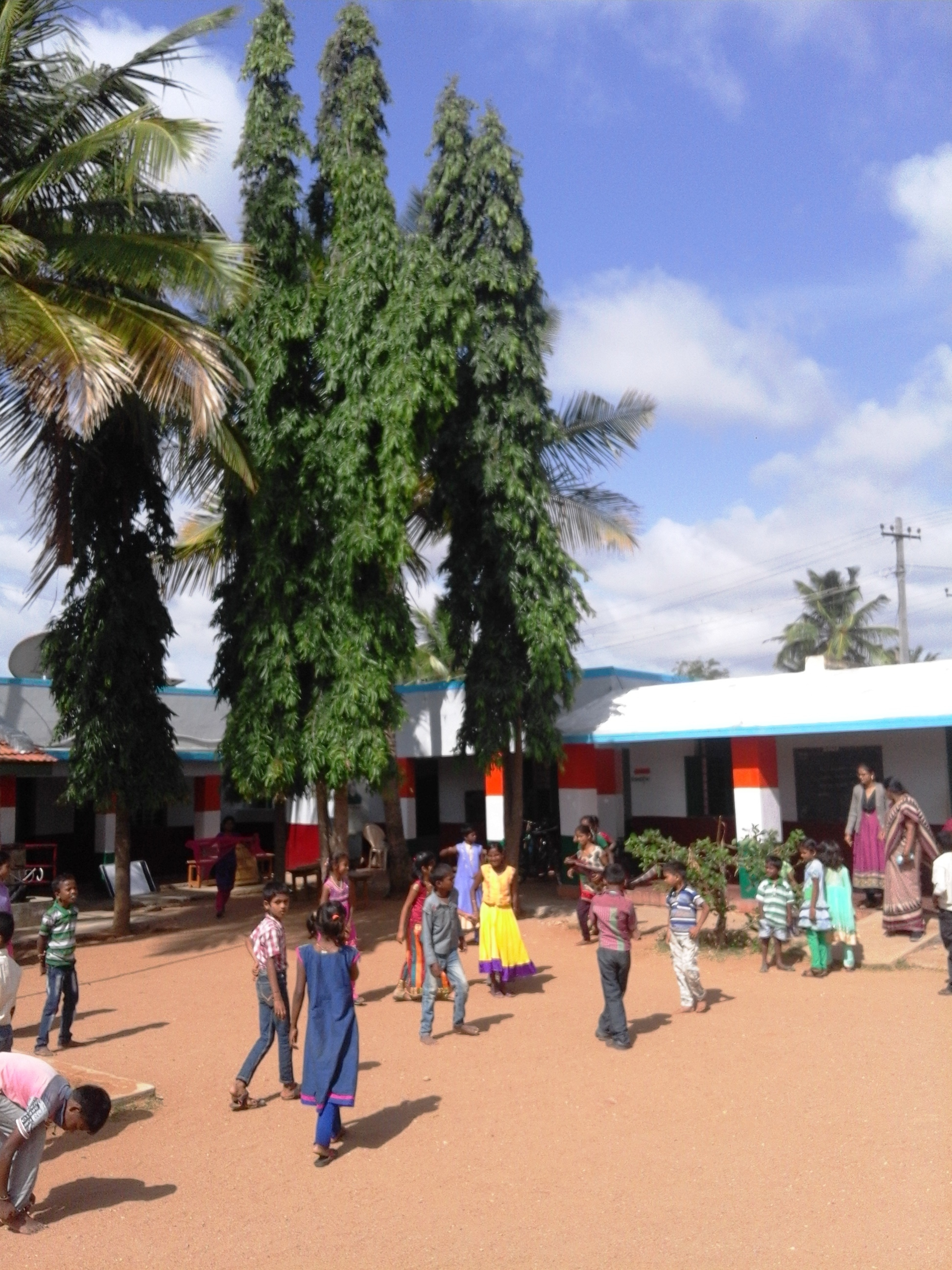
- Mariyala School
- Interactive map of Mariyala
- Coordinates: 11.946930°N 76.908124°E
- Country: India
- State: Karnataka
- District: Chamarajanagar
- Time zone: UTC+05:30 (IST)
- Vehicle registration: KA

Mariyala is a village in Chamarajanagar district of Karnataka state, India, 4.8 kilometers northwest of Chamarajanagar town.

== Transportation ==
Mariyala is served by Mariyala Gangavadi railway station.

== Demographics ==
2,255 people live in the village in 591 families. The literacy rate is 55%. The village is ruled by a sarpanch.

== Image Gallery ==
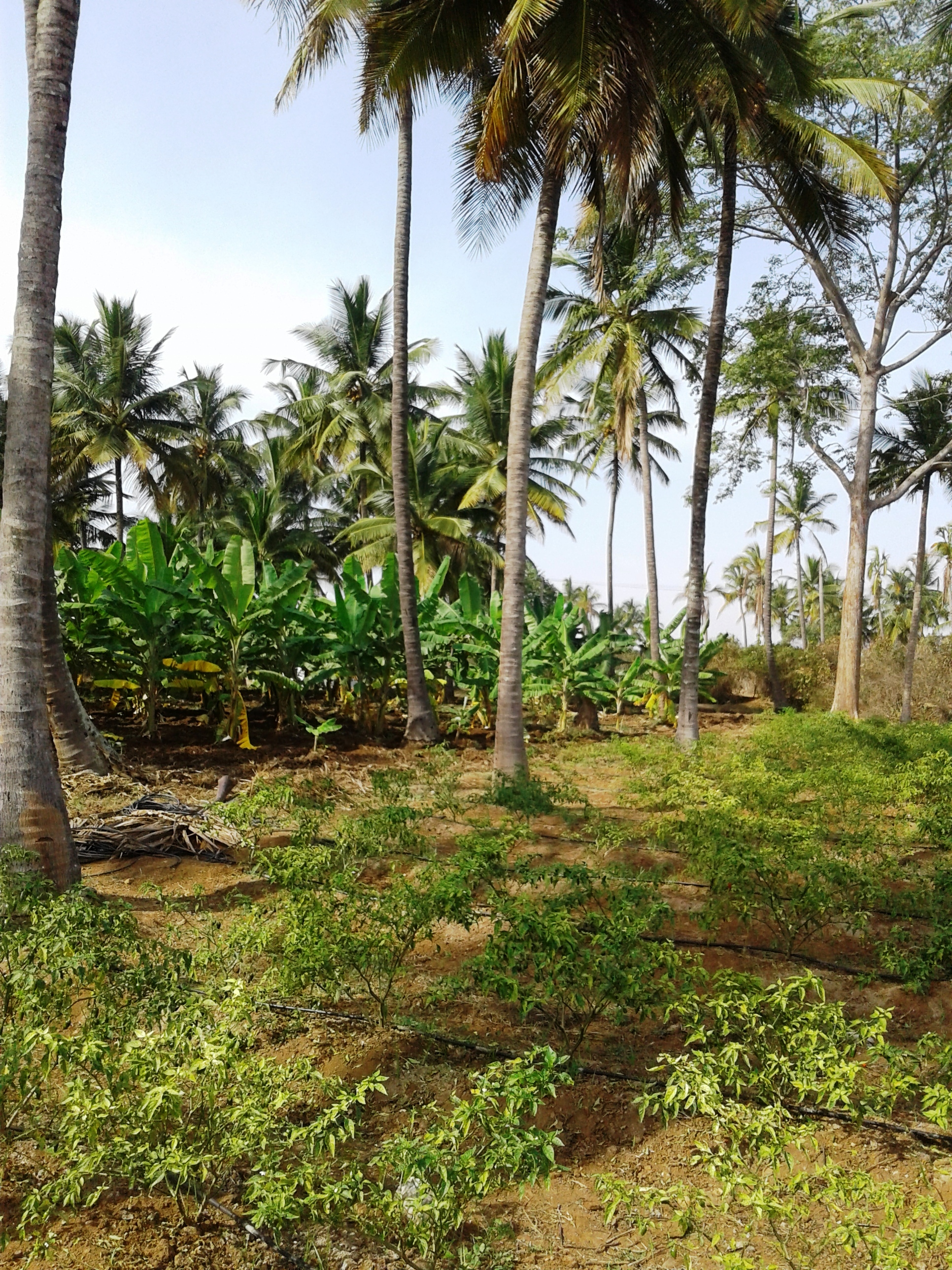
Banana Farm

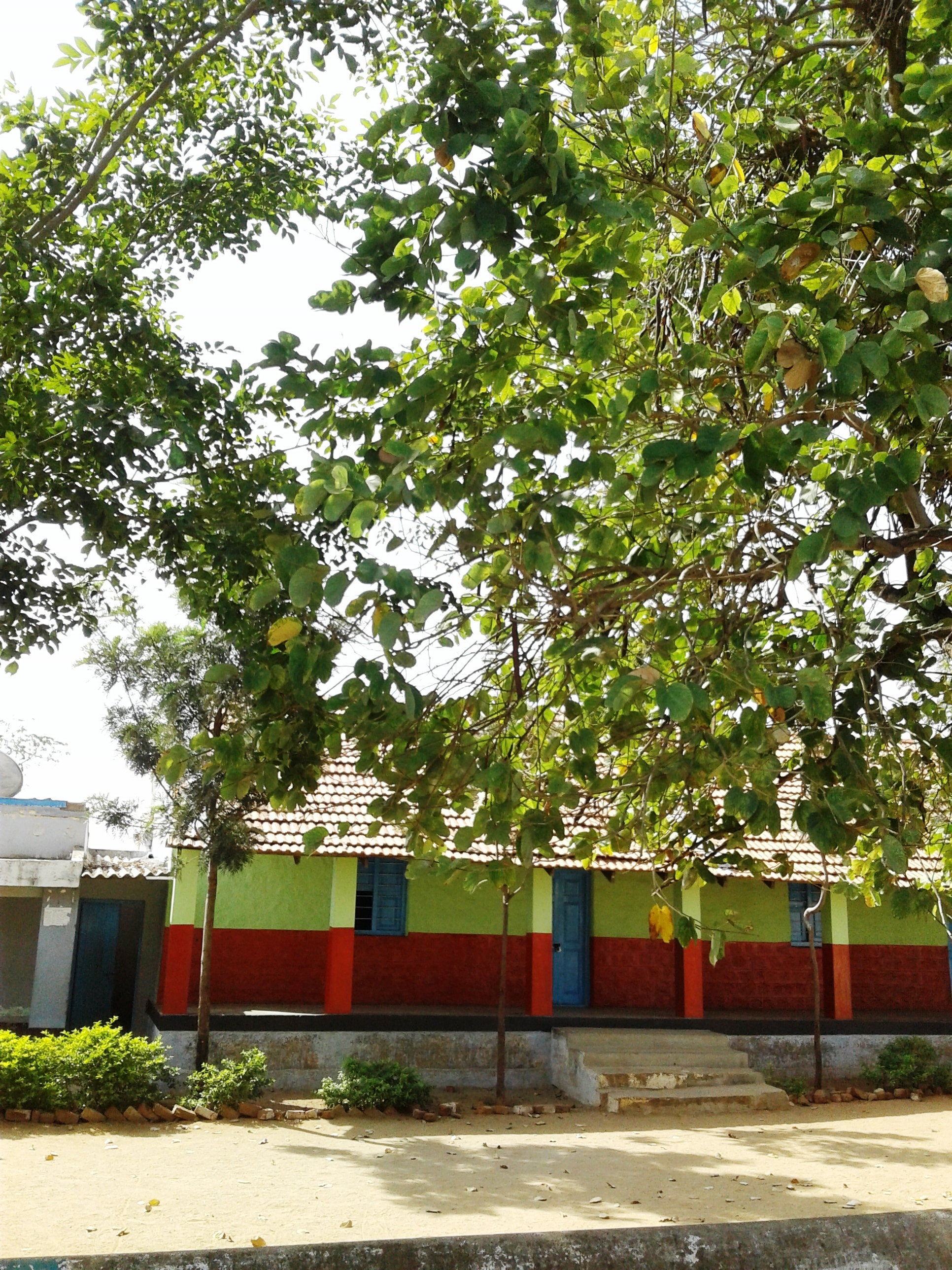
Alahundi School

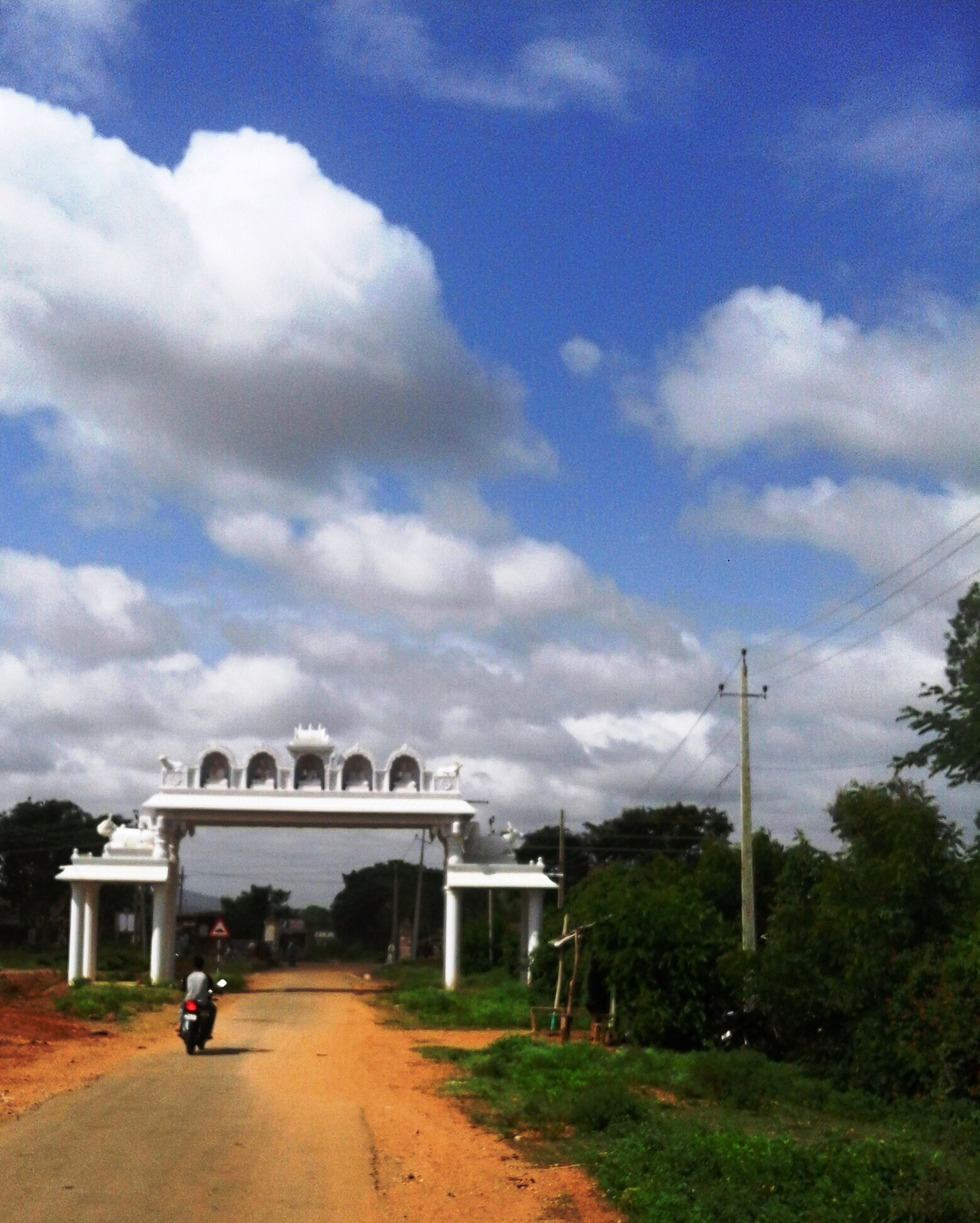
The village gate

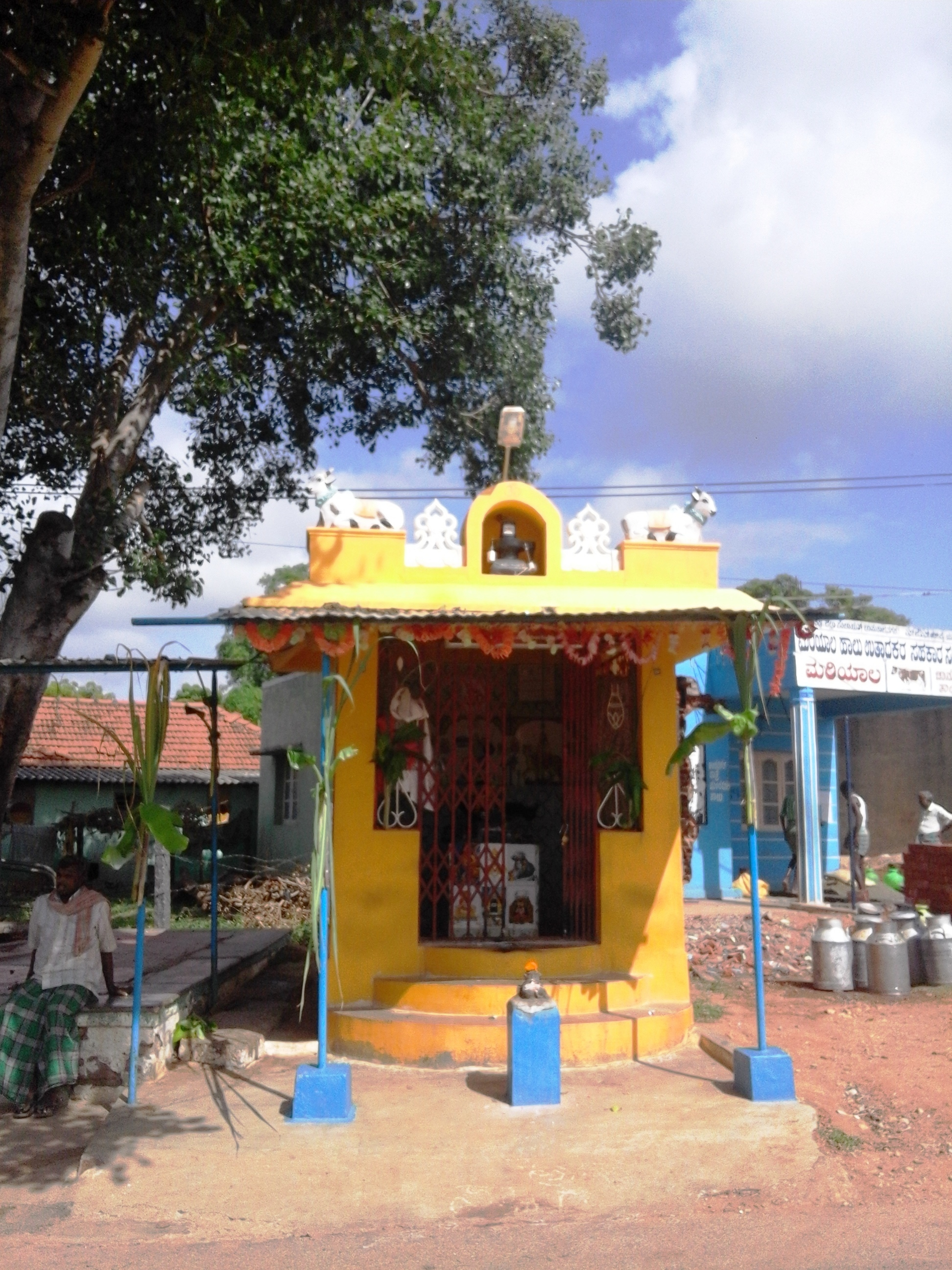
Village temple

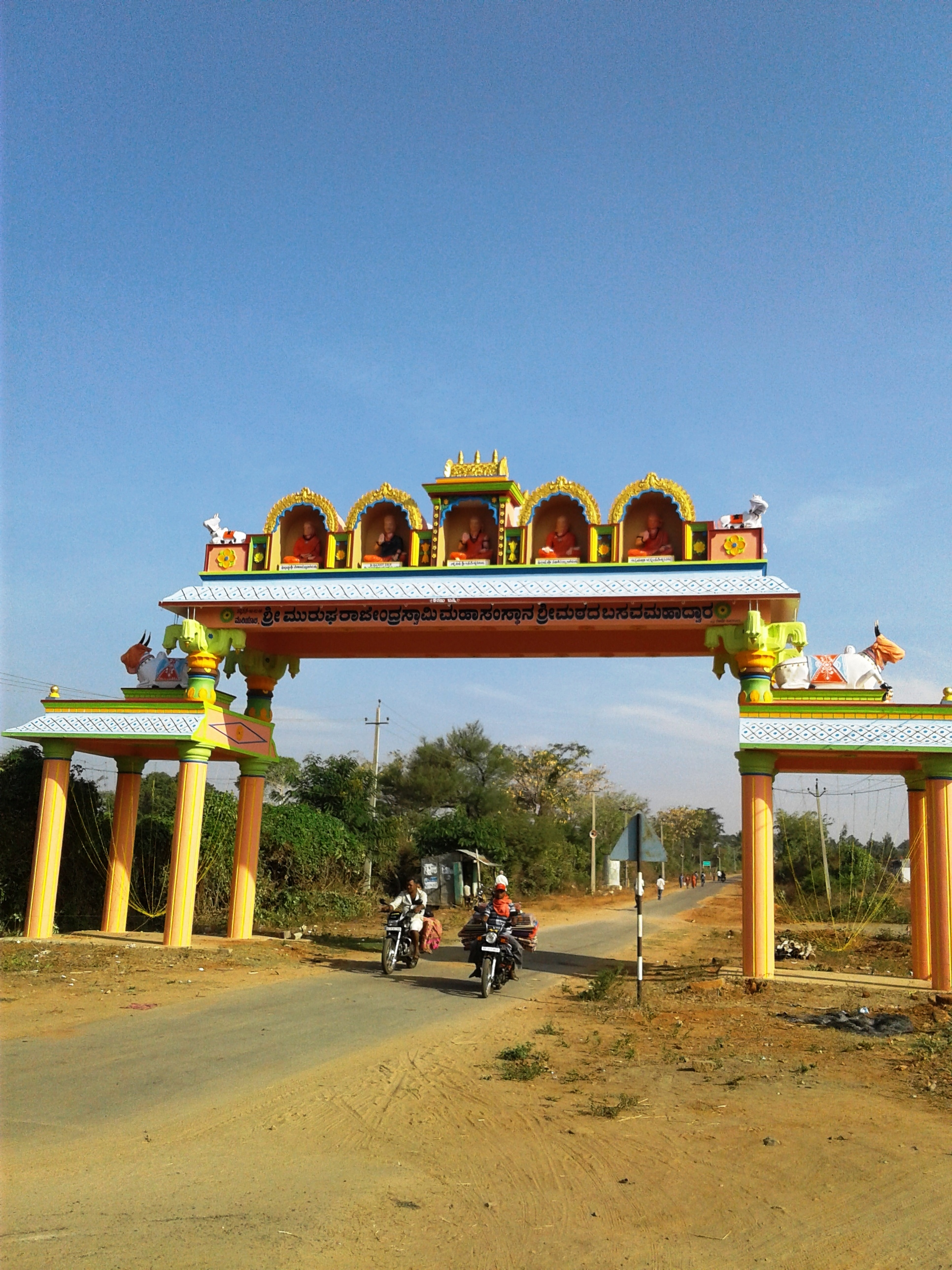
Village Arch

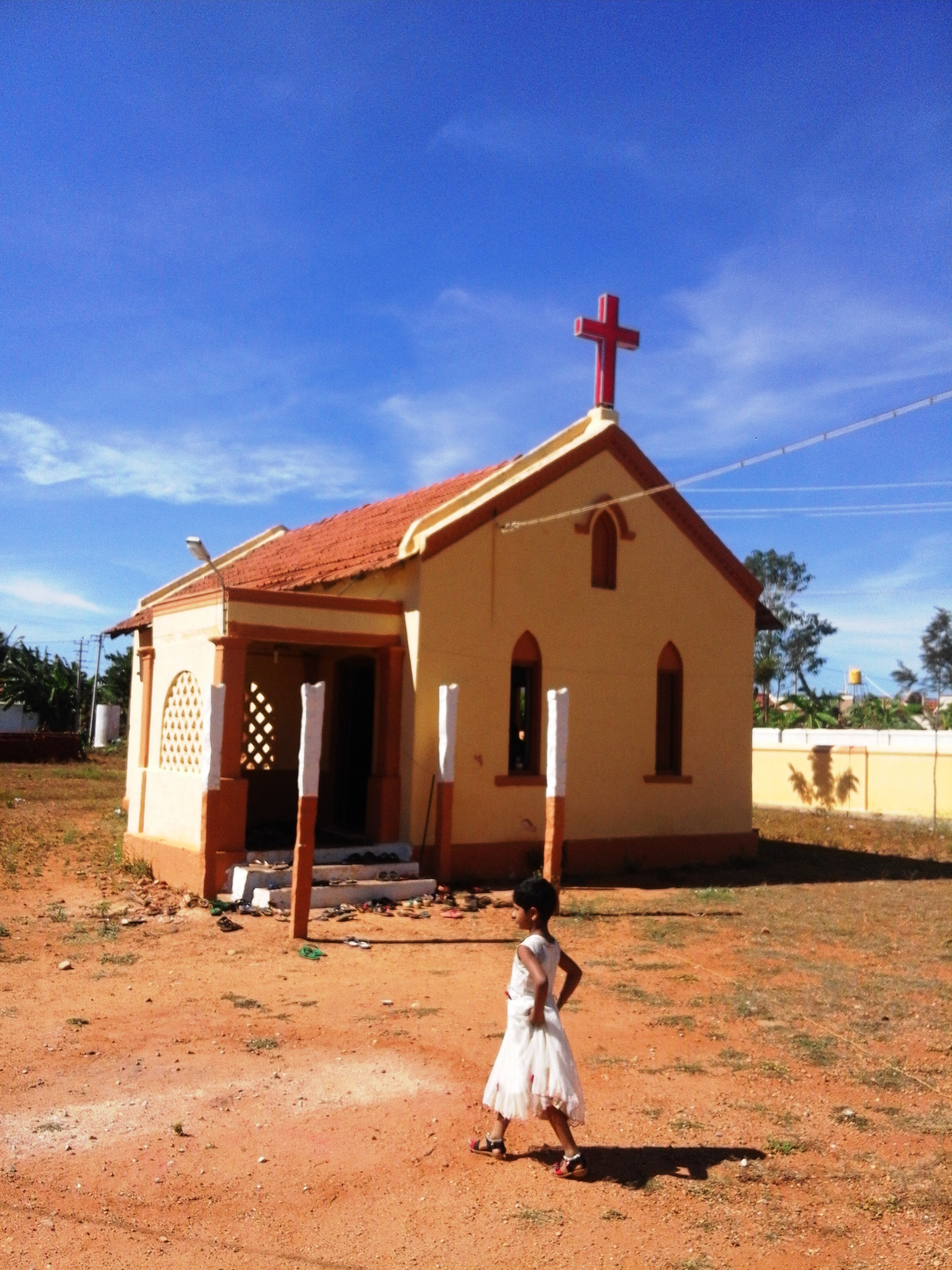
Kellamballi Church

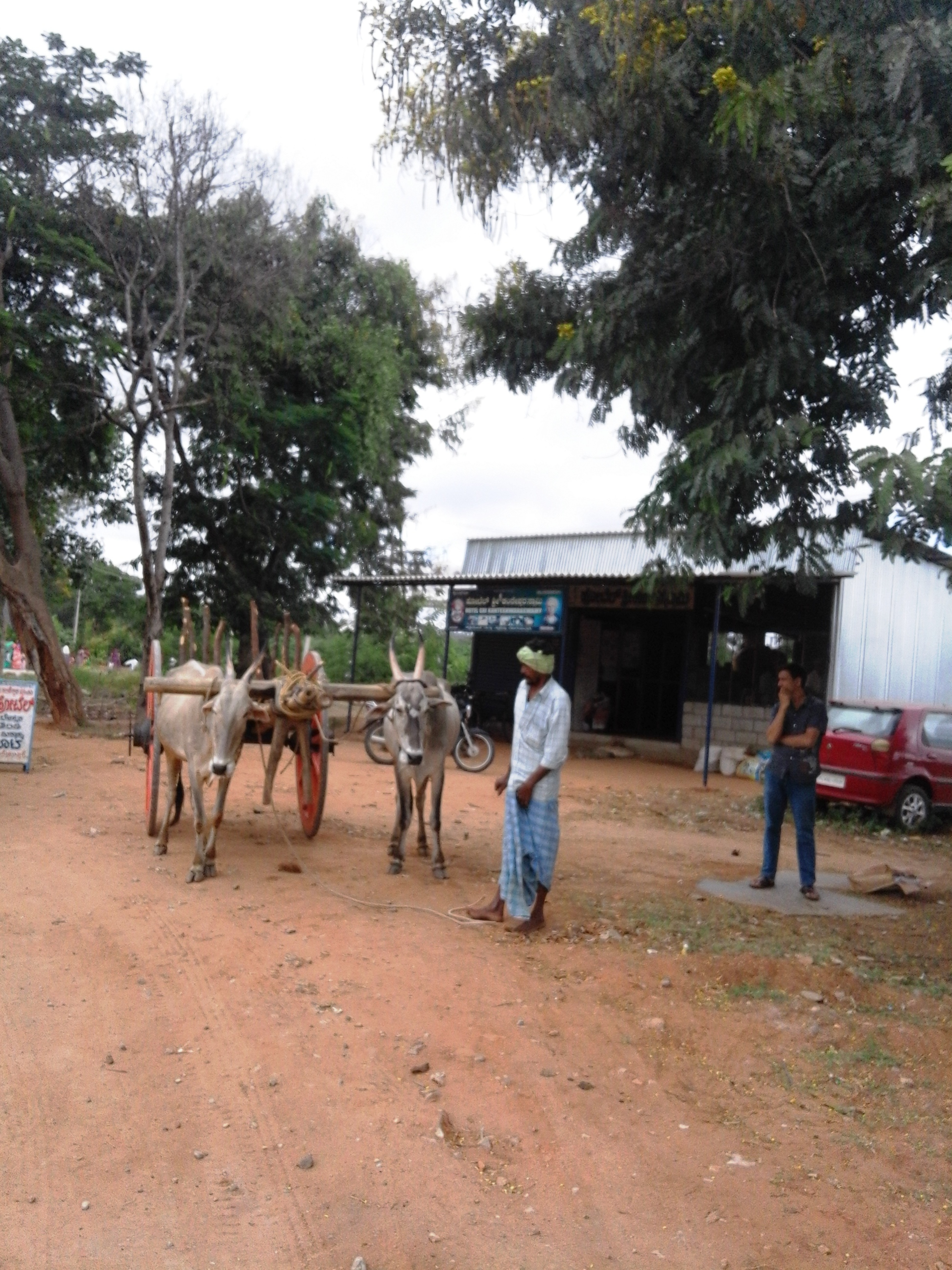
Kantheeshwara Restaurant

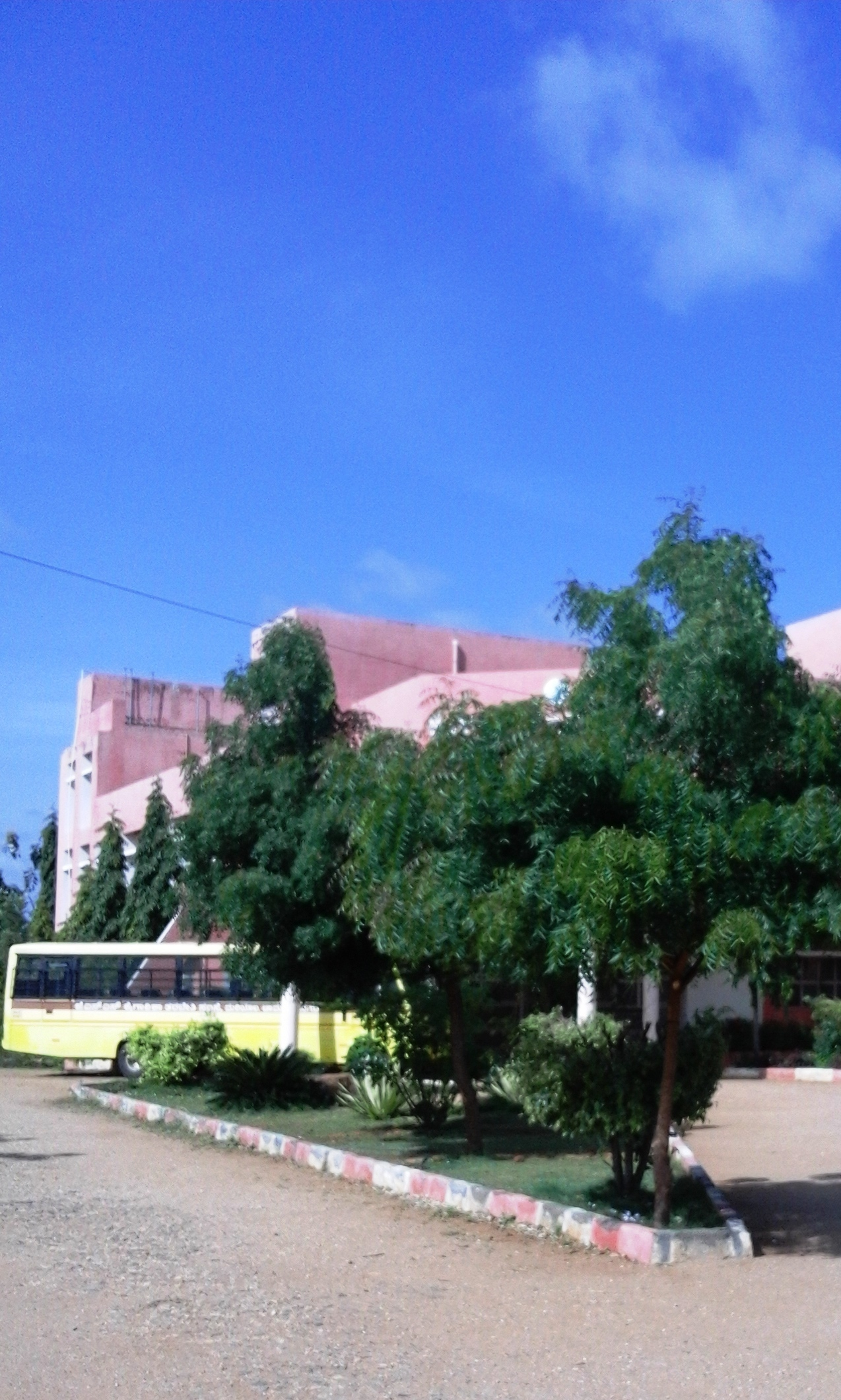
JSS Training Institute, Mariyala
