= Mysore–Chamarajanagar branch line =

Railway line in India

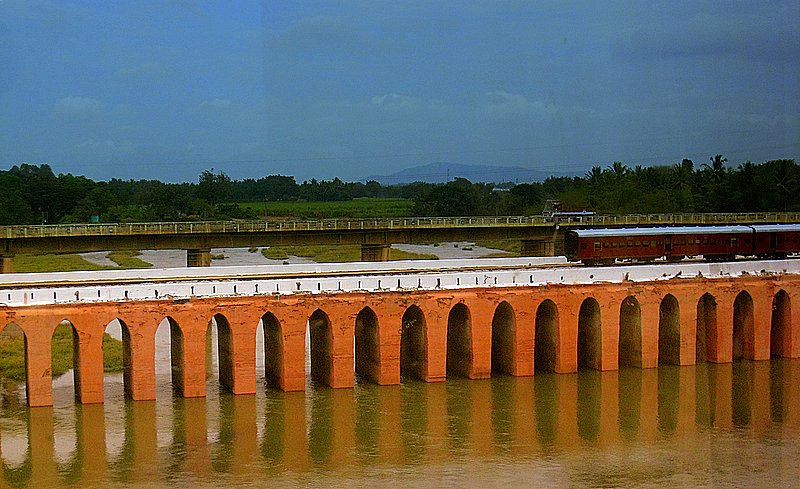
- Oldest rail bridge in India at Nanjangud

Overview
- Status: Operational
- Owner: Indian Railways
- Locale: Karnataka
- Termini: Mysore Junction (MYS); Chamarajanagar (CMNR)
- Stations: 12
- Website: www.swr.indianrailways.gov.in

Service
- Services: 1
- Route number: 84
- Operator: South Western Railway zone
- Depot: Krishnarajapuram
- Rolling stock: WDM-2; WDM-3A; WDP-4D; WDP-4; WDG-3A; WDG-4

History
- Opened: 12 November 2008; 17 years ago

Technical
- Line length: 61 kilometres (38 mi)
- Number of tracks: 1
- Track gauge: 1,676 mm (5 ft 6 in)
- Old gauge: 1,000 mm (3 ft 3 3/8 in)
- Loading gauge: 4,725 mm × 3,660 mm (15 ft 6.0 in × 12 ft 0.1 in) (BG)
- Electrification: Yes
- Operating speed: 90 km/h (56 mph)

Mysore–Chamarajanagar branch line is an Indian railway line from Mysore Junction to Chamarajanagar.

== History ==
It was inaugurated on 12 November 2008 when the Nanjangud–Chamarajanagar line was also opened to the public.

== Construction ==
The project cost ₹313 crore (US$33 million). The gauge conversion work of the 61 kilometres (38 mi) stretch was completed.

== Stations en route ==
- Mysore Junction
- Chamarajapuram
- Ashokapuram
- Kadakola
- Tandavapura
- Sujathapuram
- Nanjangud Town
- Chinnadagudihundi
- Narasambudhi
- Kavalande
- Konanur
- Badanaguppe
- Mariyala Gangavadi
- Chamarajanagar

== Background ==
The only town between Mysore and Chamarajanagar is Nanjangud. All other railway stations cater to small villages or hamlets. There are six trains running on this route. Five of them are slow moving passenger trains.
