= Chamarajanagar railway station =

Railway station in Karnataka, India

Chamarajanagar Chamarajanagara
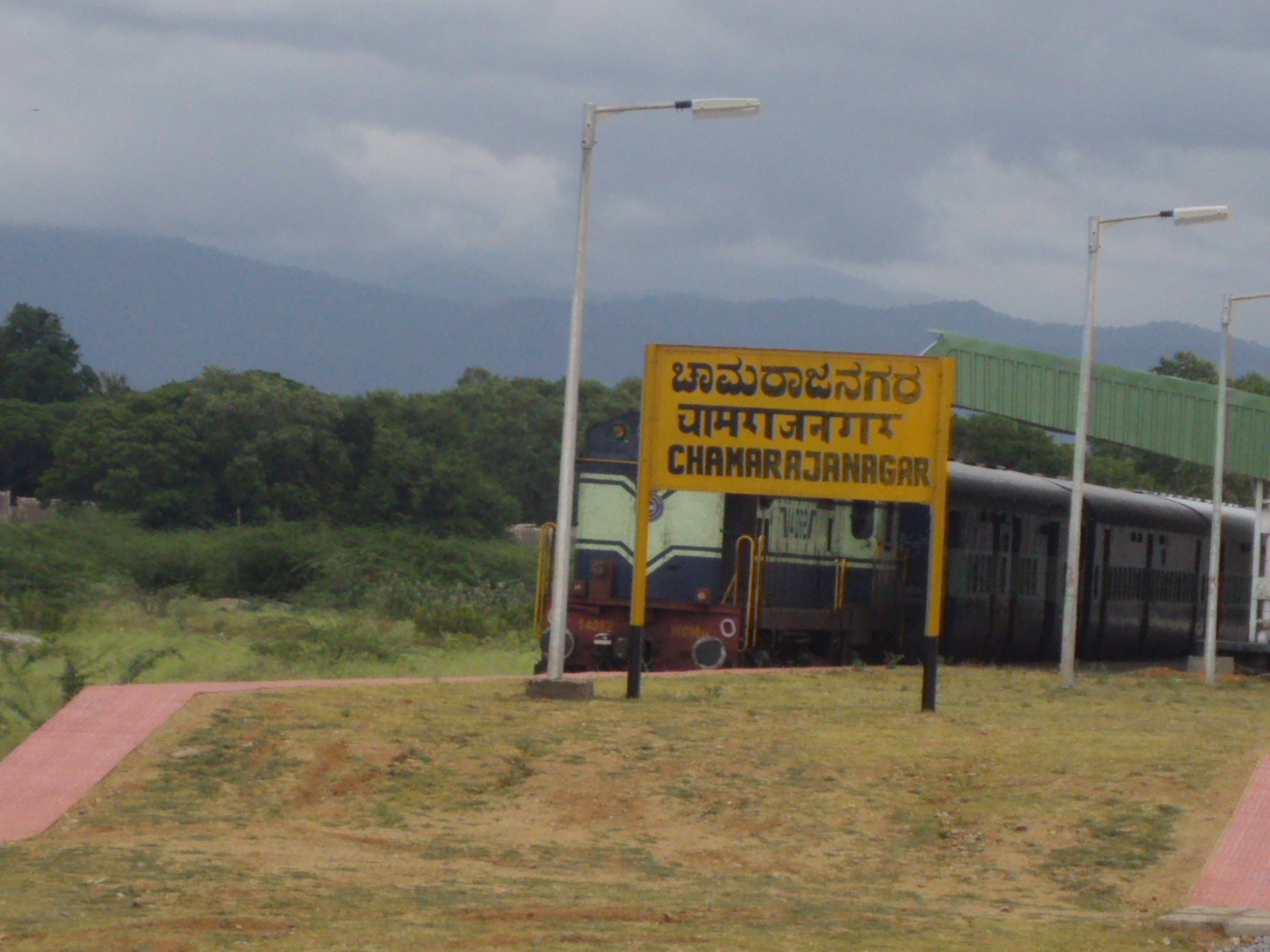
- Tirupati train at Chamarajanagar Railway Station

General information
- Location: Chamarajanagar district, Karnataka; India
- Coordinates: 11.934942°N 76.932505°E
- Elevation: 760 metres (2,490 ft)
- System: Passenger train station
- Platforms: 2

Construction
- Structure type: Standard (on ground station)
- Parking: Yes

Other information
- Status: Functioning
- Station code: CMNR
- Zone(s): South Western Railway zone
- Division(s): Mysore

History
- Opened: 2008; 18 years ago
Location

The Chamarajanagar railway station is a railway station located in Chamarajanagara district of Karnataka, India. Situated on the Mysore–Chamarajanagar branch line, the station primarily serves the town of Chamarajanagara.

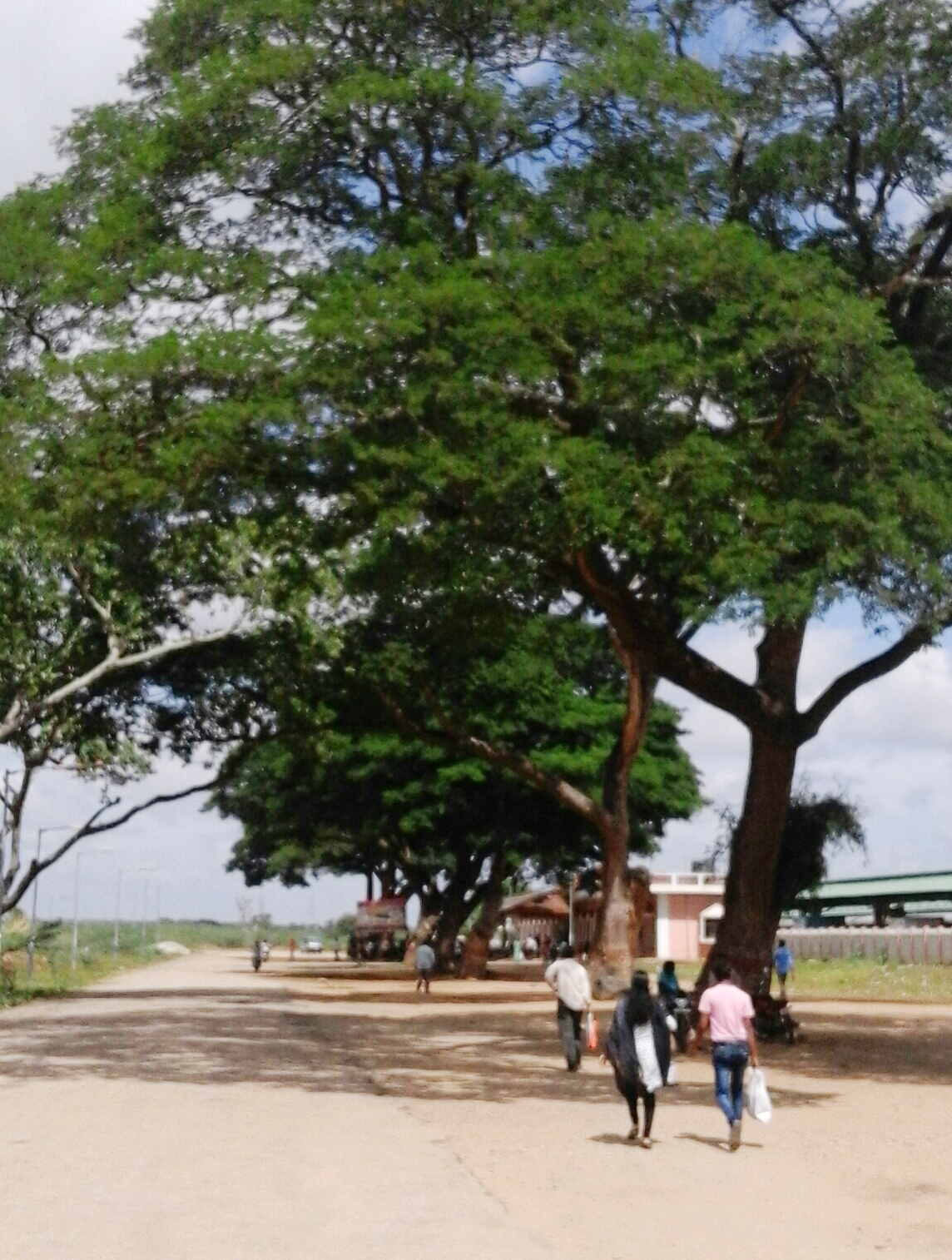
Entrance to the railway station

== History ==
The project cost ₹313 crore (US$33 million). The gauge conversion work of the 61 kilometres (38 mi) stretch was completed. There are six trains running forward and backward in this route. Five of them are slow moving passenger trains.

== Trains ==
Trains to/from Chamarajanagar Railway Station are as follows:

Express

- 16219/16220 – Chamarajanagara <-> Tirupati

Passenger

- 56201/56202 – Chamarajanagara <-> Mysuru
- 56203/56204 – Chamarajanagara <-> Mysuru
- 56207/56208 – Chamarajanagara <-> Mysuru
- 56209/56210 – Chamarajanagara <-> Mysuru
- 56281/56282 – Chamarajanagara <-> Bengaluru
