= Ekambarakuppam =

Ekambarakuppam ஏகாம்பரகுப்பம்
- Town
- Interactive map of Ekambarakuppam
- Location in Andhra Pradesh, India
- Coordinates: 13°19′02″N 79°34′04″E
- Country: India
- State: Andhra Pradesh
- District: Chittoor

Government
  - YSRCP: RK Roja

Population (2001)
  - Total: 6,797

Languages
  - Official: Tamil, Telugu
- Time zone: UTC+5:30 (IST)
- PIN: 517592
- Telephone code: +918577
- Vehicle registration: AP 03

Ekambarakuppam is a village in Chittoor district of the Indian state of Andhra Pradesh. It is located in Nagari Mandal.
