= Mysore railway division =

Railway division of India

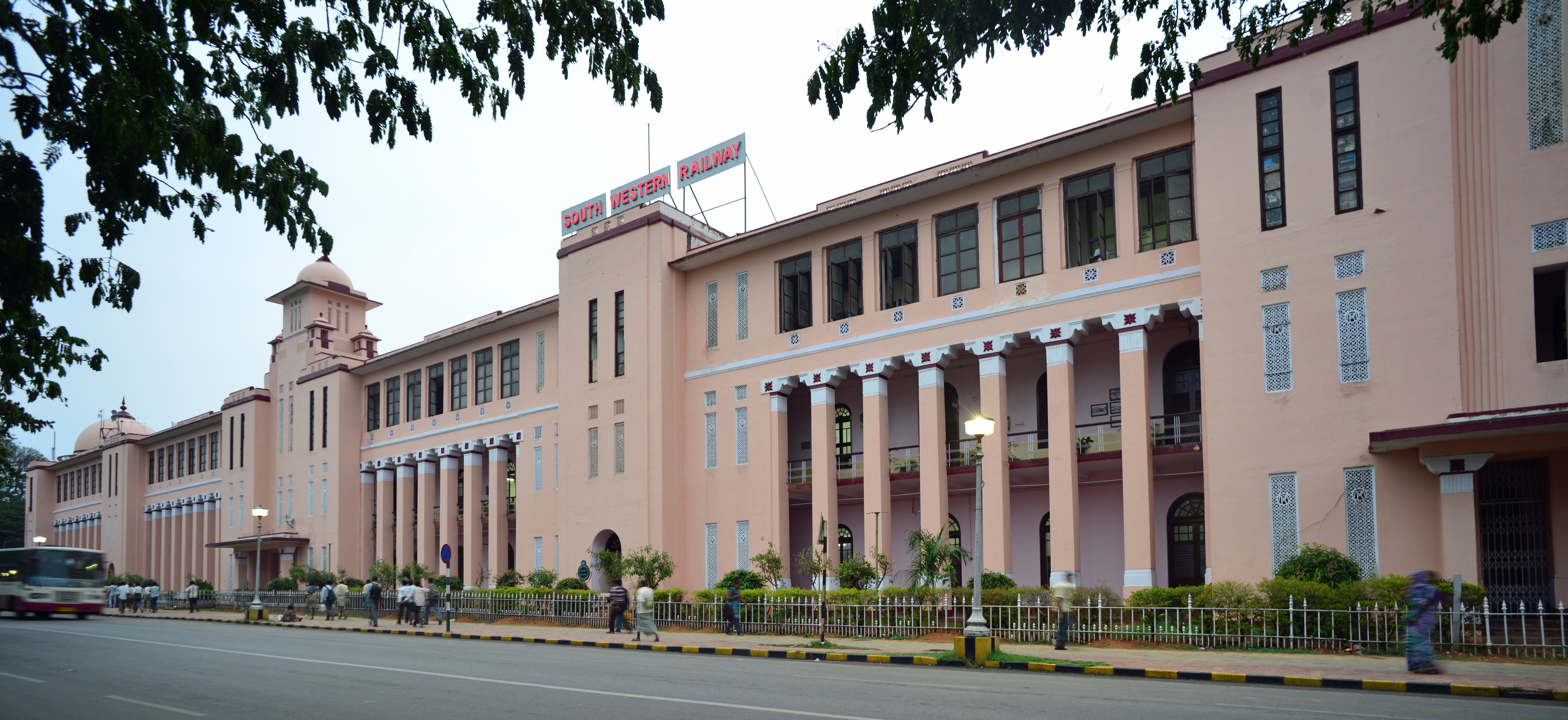
Railway Office, Mysore

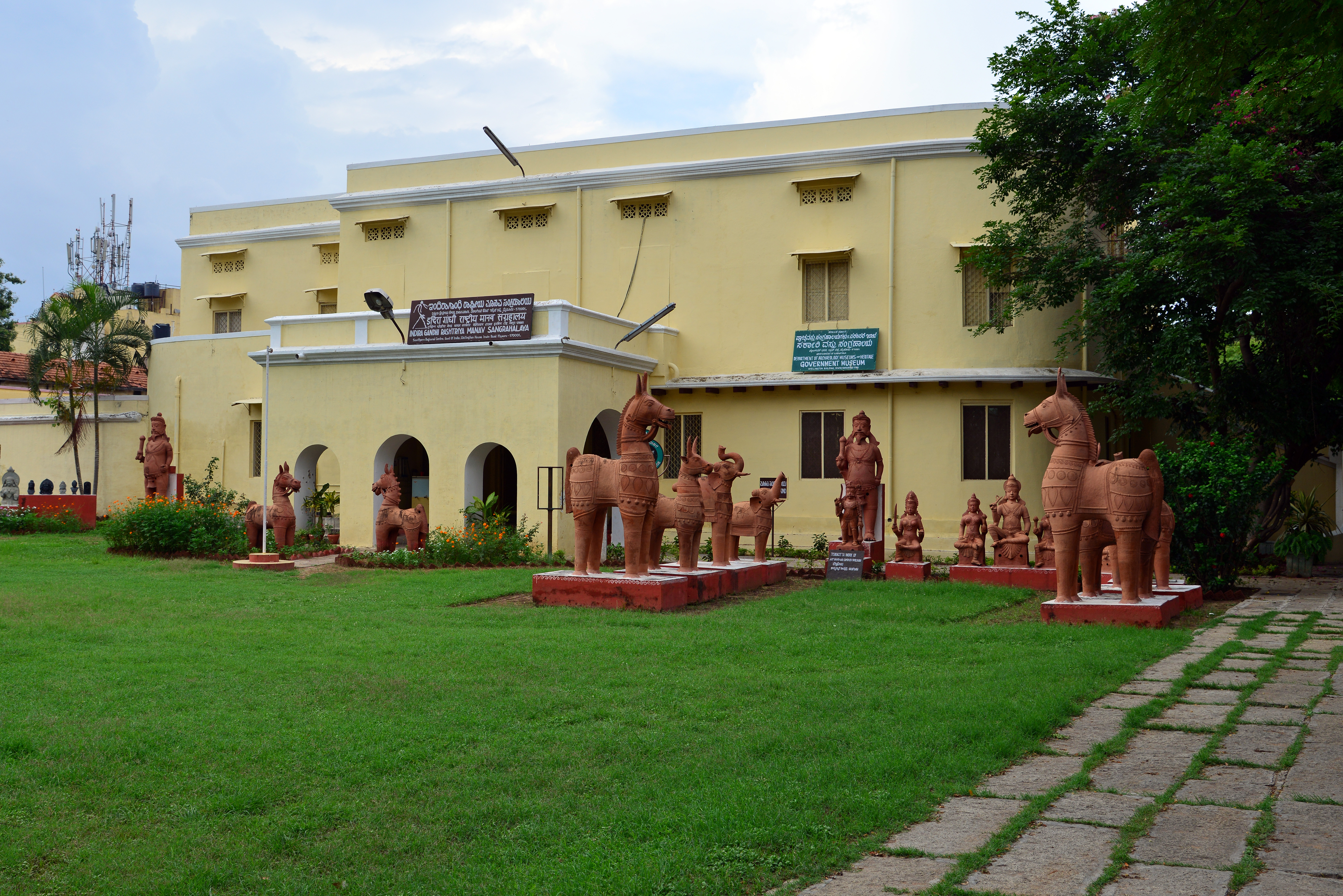
Railway Station road, Mysore

Mysuru railway division is one of the three railway divisions under the jurisdiction of South Western Railway zone of the Indian Railways. This railway division was formed on 5 November 1951 and its headquarter is located at Mysuru in the state of Karnataka in India.

Bengaluru railway division and Hubballi Railway division are the other railway divisions under SWR Zone headquartered at Hubballi.

== List of railway stations and towns ==
The list includes the stations under the Mysuru railway division and their station category.

Category of station	No. of stations	Names of stations
NSG-1	0	
NSG-2	2	Mysuru Junction railway station Mangaluru Central railway station
NSG-3	5	Davangere, Shivamogga Town, Arsikere Junction railway station , Hassan junction, Mangaluru Junction
NSG-4	8	, , Nanjangud Town railway station, , Chamarajanagar town, Harihar, Kadur, Birur, Sagarajambagaru, Subrahmanya Road
NSG-5	-	-
NSG-6	-	-
HG-1	1	
HG-2	1	
HG-3	1	
Total	-	-

Stations closed for Passengers -
