= Mysore-Ooty Road =

Tourist trail in South India

Mysore–Ooty Road

Route information
- Length: 158 km (98 mi)
- Existed: 1799–present

Major junctions
- From: Mysore, Karnataka
- Gundlupet
- East end: Udhagamandalam, Tamil Nadu

Location
- Country: India
- States: Tamil Nadu, Karnataka
- Major cities: Gudalur

Highway system
- Roads in India; Expressways; National; State; Asian

Mysore–Ooty Road or Mysore–Udhagamandalam Road is a tourist trail of South India starting from Mysore in Karnataka state and ending in Udhagamandalam in Nilgiri district of Tamil Nadu state, India. Both routes pass through Bandipur National Park in Gundlupet, Karnataka and Mudumalai National Park in Tamil Nadu.

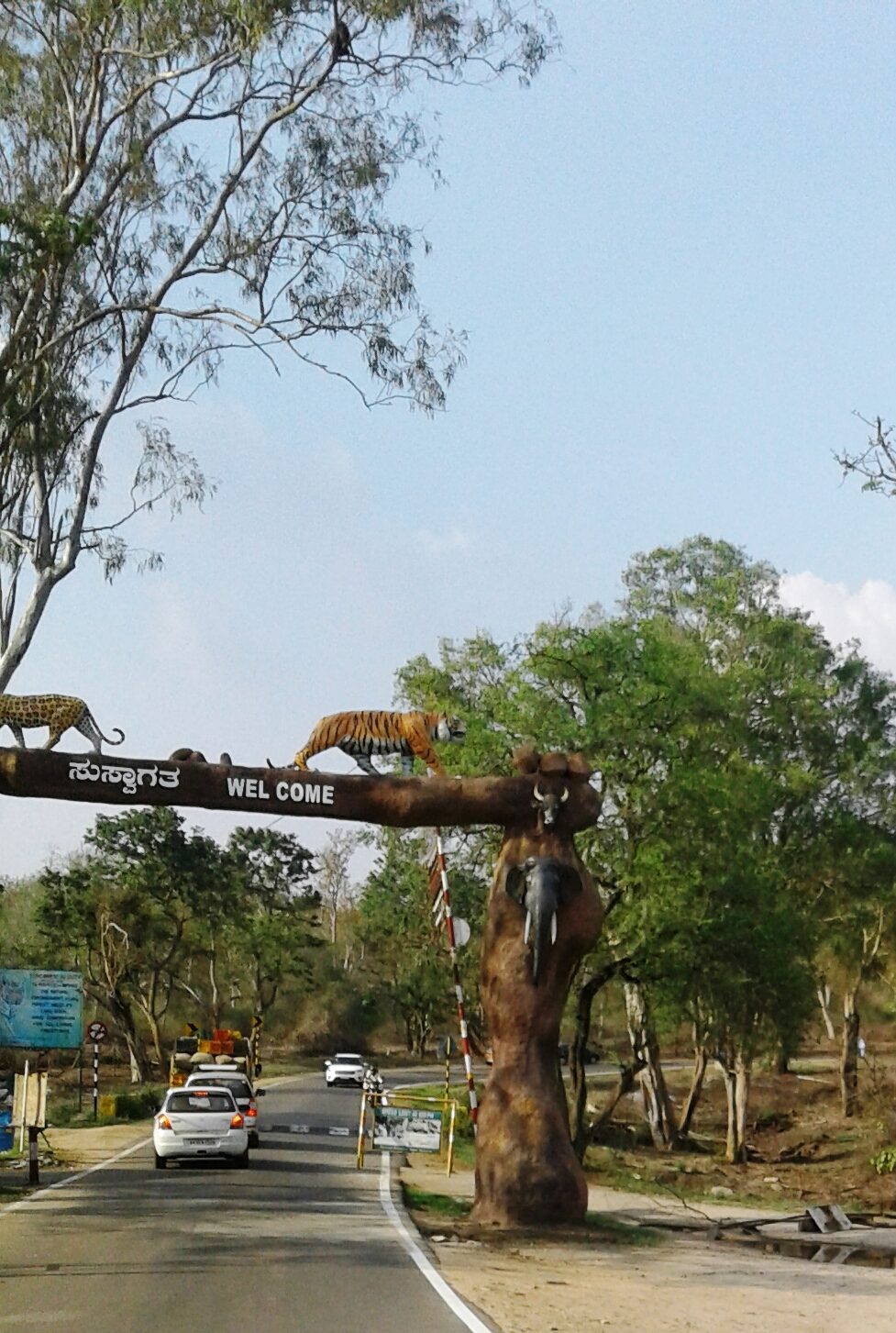
Karnataka Tamil Nadu Border

At the crossing there are statues of a tiger, a leopard, a gaur, a deer and an elephant.

== Distance ==
- Small vehicles take a 124 km route by Mysore-Theppakkadu-Masinagudi-Kallati-Ooty Road.
- Buses and trucks take a longer route of 158 km route by Mysore-Theppakkadu-Gudalur-Pykara-Ooty Road.

Ooty is well connected by roads. It is 260 km (172 mi) from Bangalore, 598 km (372 mi) from Chennai (via Salem, Erode, and Coimbatore), 80 km (50 mi) from Coimbatore and 124 km (77 mi) from Mysore. Ooty is situated on NH 181 and is connected by road via the five main accepted Nilgiri Ghat Roads. Bus services operated by TNSTC and KSRTC connect major towns in the state and nearby towns in the district such as Coonoor, Kotagiri, and Gudalur, Mysore and Gundlupet.

== Bandipur National Park ==
Bandipur National Park (Kannada: ಬಂಡೀಪುರ ರಾಷ್ಟ್ರೀಯ ಉದ್ಯಾನ) established in 1974 as a tiger reserve under Project Tiger, is a national park located in the south Indian state of Karnataka. It was once a private hunting reserve for the Maharaja of the Kingdom of Mysore but has now been upgraded to Bandipur Tiger Reserve. Bandipur is known for its wildlife and has many types of biomes, but dry deciduous forest is dominant.

The park spans an area of 874 square kilometers (337 sq mi), protecting several species of India's endangered wildlife. Together with the adjoining Nagarhole National Park (643 km^{2} (248 sq mi)), Mudumalai National Park (320 km^{2} (120 sq mi)) and Wayanad Wildlife Sanctuary (344 km^{2} (133 sq mi)), it is part of the Nilgiri Biosphere Reserve totaling 2,183 km^{2} (843 sq mi) making it the largest protected area in southern India and largest habitate of wild elephants in south Asia. Bandipur is located in Gundlupet taluq of Chamarajanagar district. It is about 80 kilometers (50 mi) from the city of Mysore on the route to a major tourist destination of Ooty. As a result, Bandipur sees a lot of tourist traffic and there are many wildlife fatalities caused by speeding vehicles that are reported each year. There is a ban on traffic from 9 pm to 6 am of dusk to dawn to help bring down the death rate of wildlife.

== Mudumalai National Park ==
The Mudumalai National Park and Wildlife Sanctuary (Tamil: முதுமலை தேசிய பூங்கா மற்றும் விலங்குகள் சரணாலயம்) also a declared tiger reserve, lies on the northwestern side of the Nilgiri Hills (Blue Mountains), in Nilgiri District, about 150 kilometres (93 mi) north-west of Coimbatore city in Kongu Nadu region of Tamil Nadu. It shares its boundaries with the states of Karnataka and Kerala. The sanctuary is divided into five ranges – Masinagudi, Thepakadu, Mudumalai, Kargudi and Nellakota.

The protected area is home to several endangered and vulnerable species including Indian elephant, Bengal tiger, gaur and Indian leopard. There are at least 266 species of birds in the sanctuary, including critically endangered Indian white-rumped vulture and long-billed vulture.

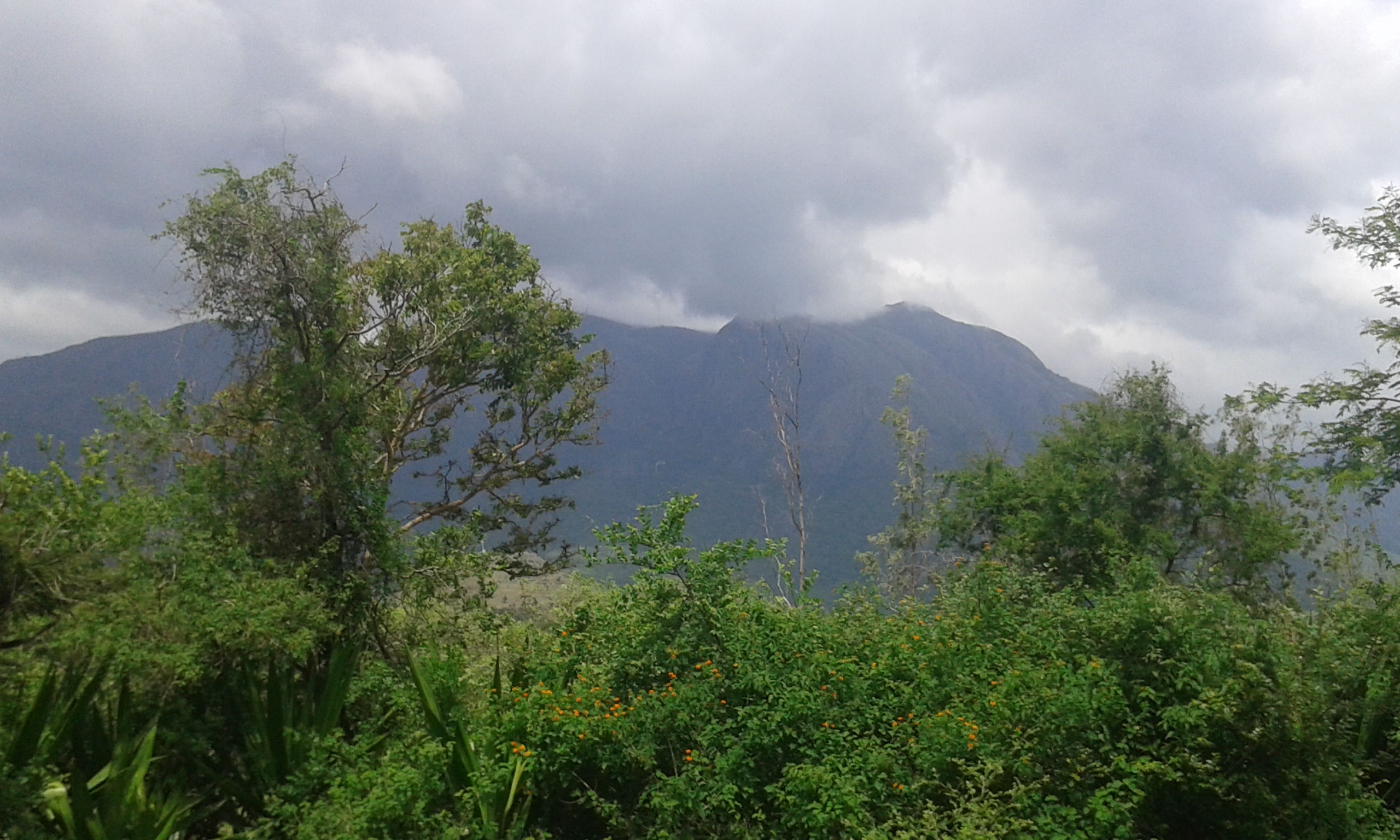
Mudumalai tiger reserve

The Western Ghats Nilgiri Sub-Cluster of 6,000 square kilometres (2,300 sq mi), including all of Mudumalai National Park, is under consideration by the UNESCO World Heritage Committee for selection as a World Heritage Site.

== The driving experience ==
=== Mysore to Nanjangud ===
The road in this sector is two track with a toll booth in the middle. The major tourist attraction is the S.G.S.Ashram with an aviary, library and museum inside. There are good restaurants like Rhythm.n.Hues, The Evergreen, the Grand View and Vishnu Cafe before reaching the airport. Flights are available from Mysore Airport to Chennai, Hyderabad, Goa and Kochi. Before airport there is a scenic place with a lake and bend in the road. After Kadakola town, there are two Punjabi dhabha restaurants offering private outdoor huts. There is a riverside temple at Sujathapuram and also India's oldest railway bridge is located here. Cafe Coffee Day has an outlet here. Royal Hotel provides Kerala style food. Nanjangud town has many lodges and restaurants.

=== Nanjangud to Gundlupet ===
This stretch also has two way road without any toll. There are some beautiful churches and temples on this way. Many Kerala restaurants dot either side of the road. There is a drive-in-cafe 15 km from Nanjangud. There is an outlet of Cafe Coffee Day another ten kilometer forward.

=== Gundlupet to Gudalur ===
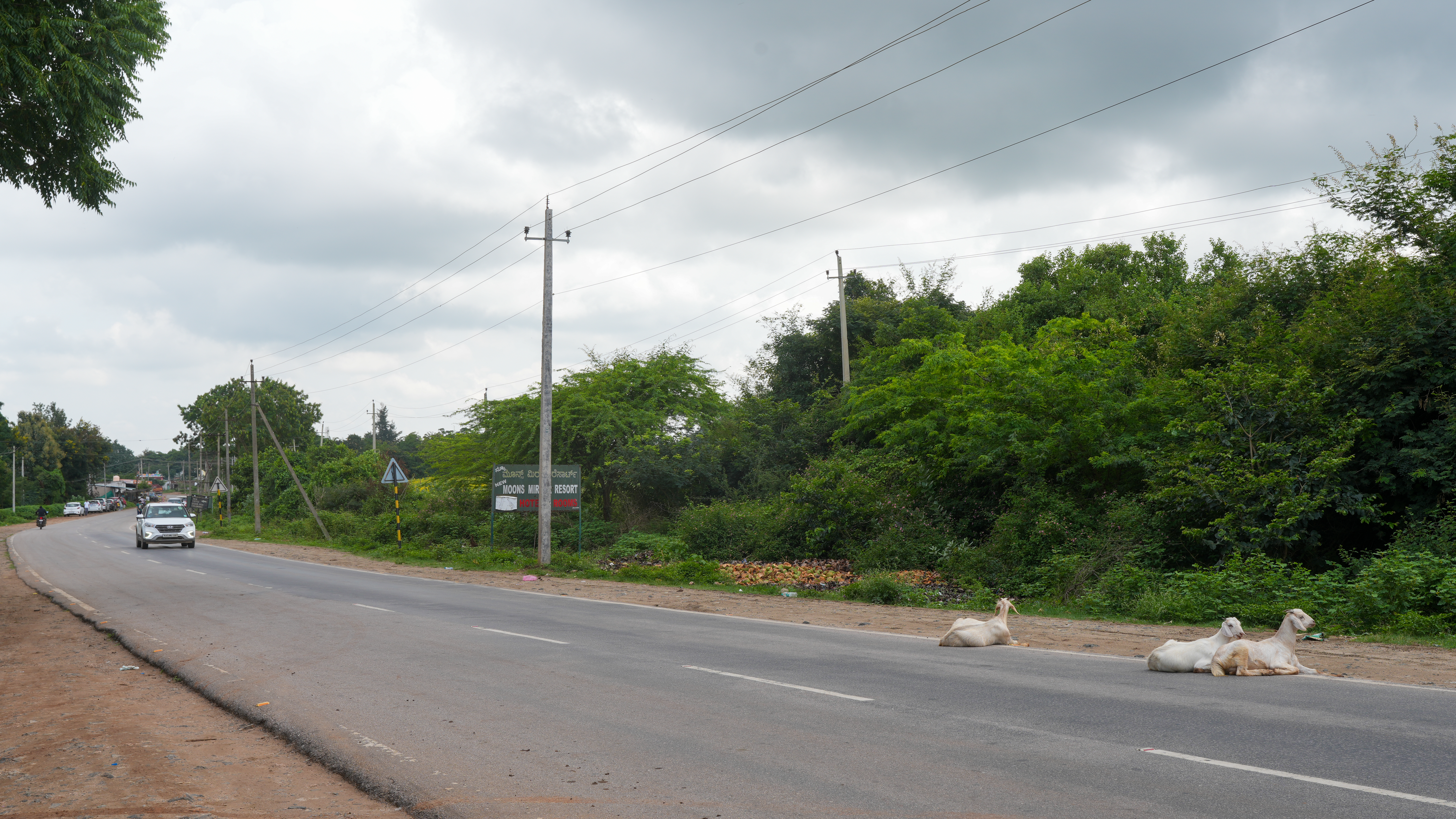
NH 181 between Bandipur and Gundlepet

This is a 2-lane road passing through two national parks. You can find humps every 300 meters for safety of the animals. Night traffic is banned and animals may be sighted during daytime.

=== Gudalur to Ooty ===
This is a very scenic uphill route but traffic blocks are very common near the Frog Hill viewpoint. They last for one or two hours. The two sides of the road are very scenic with shola forests, undulating hills and lakes.

== Image gallery ==
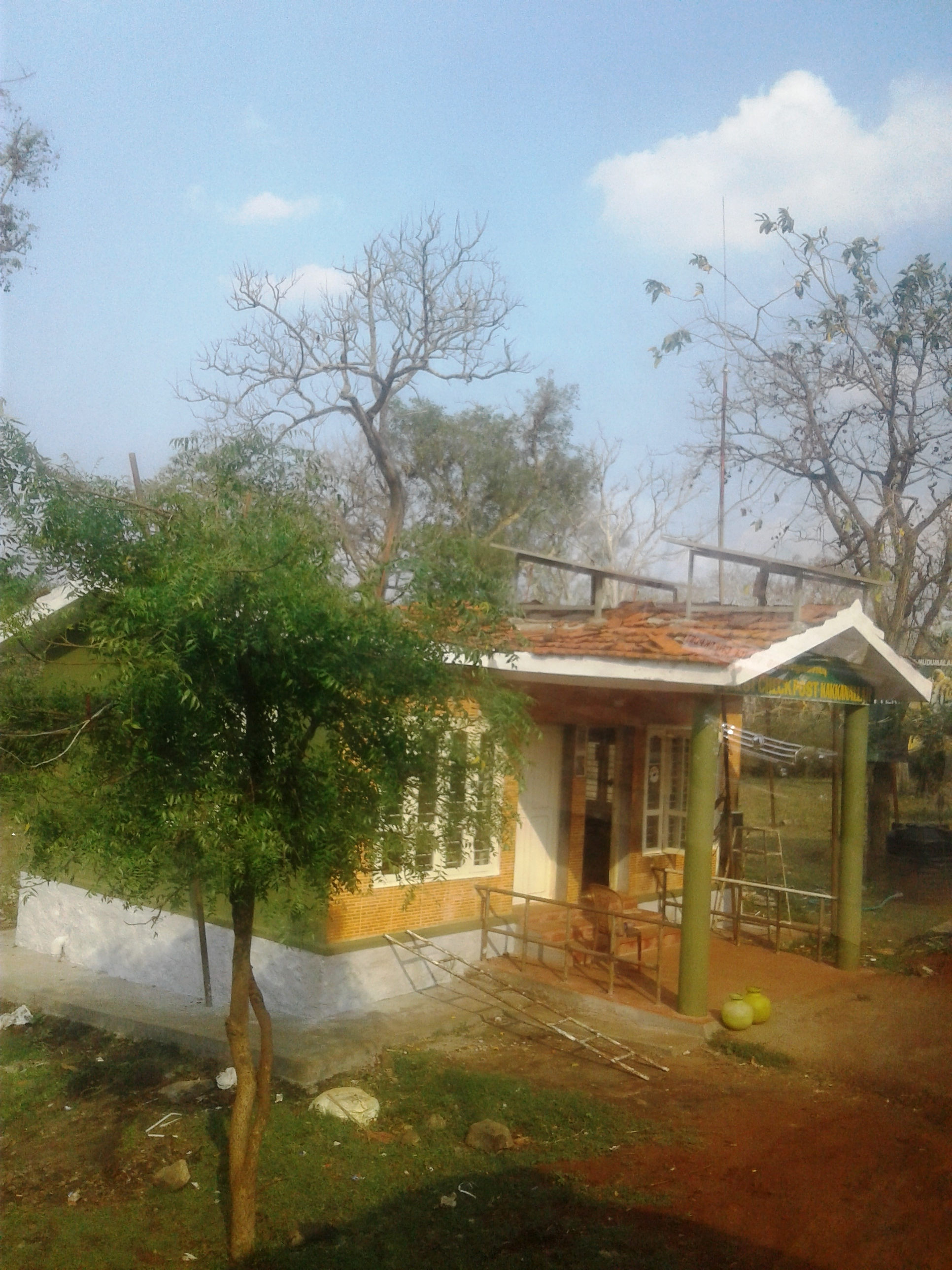
Kakkanallah Checkpost

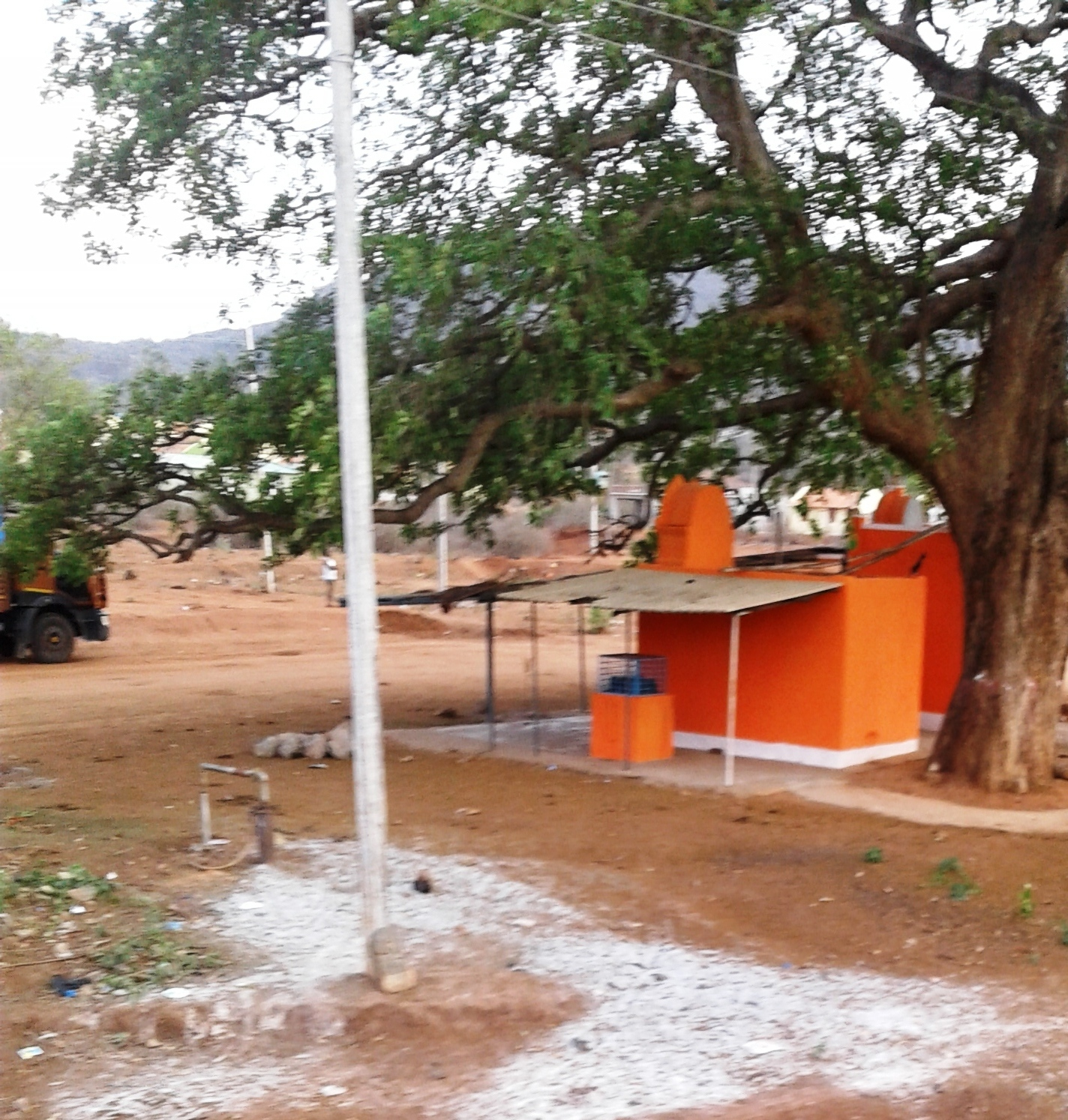
Melkamanahalli village

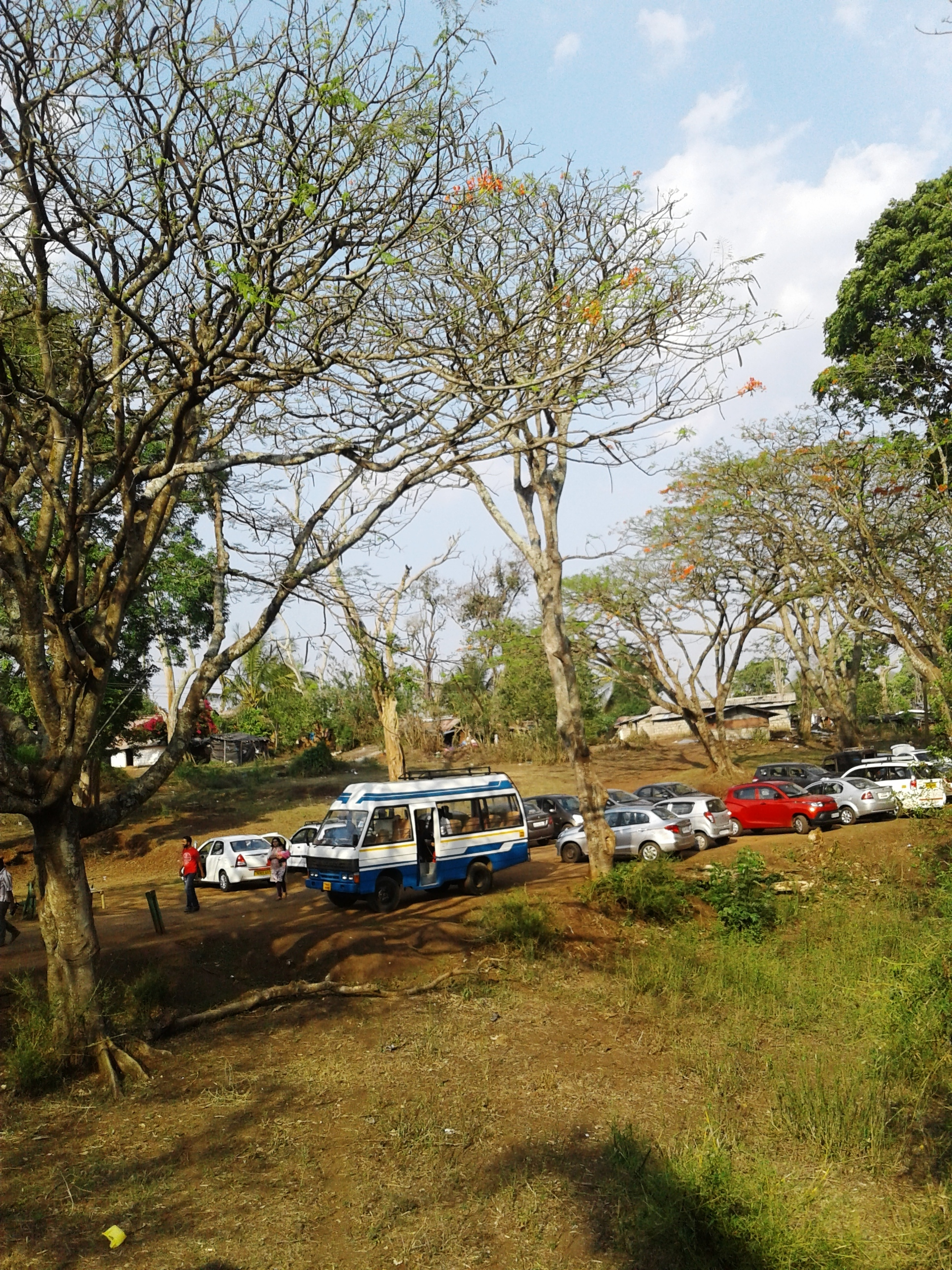
Theppakkadu Junction

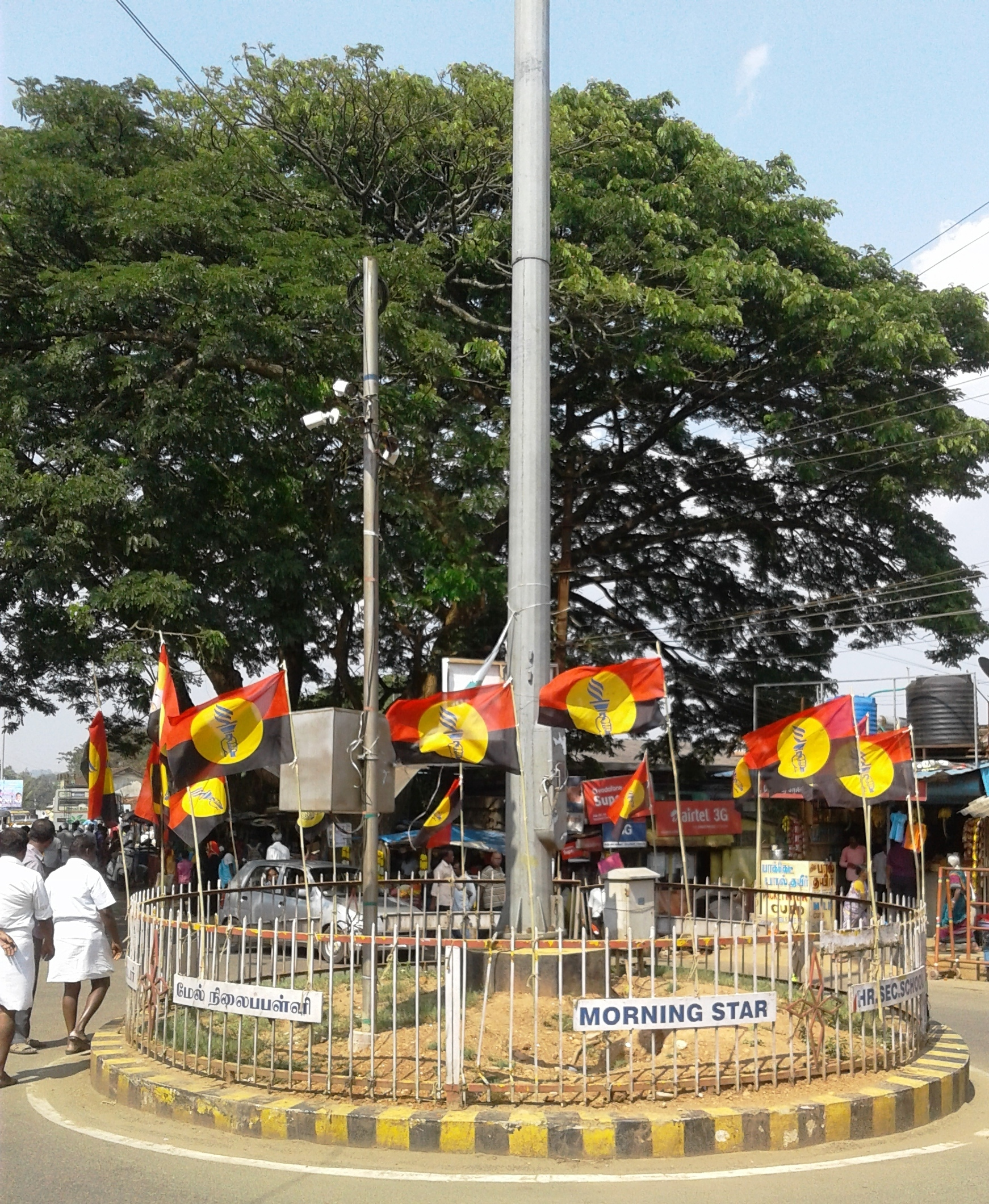
Gudalur Bus Stand Junction

== See also ==
- National Highway 181 (India)
- National Highway 766 (India)
