= Needle Rock View Point =

Needle Rock scenic view point, Nilgiris

Coordinates: 11°29′57″N 76°31′17″E

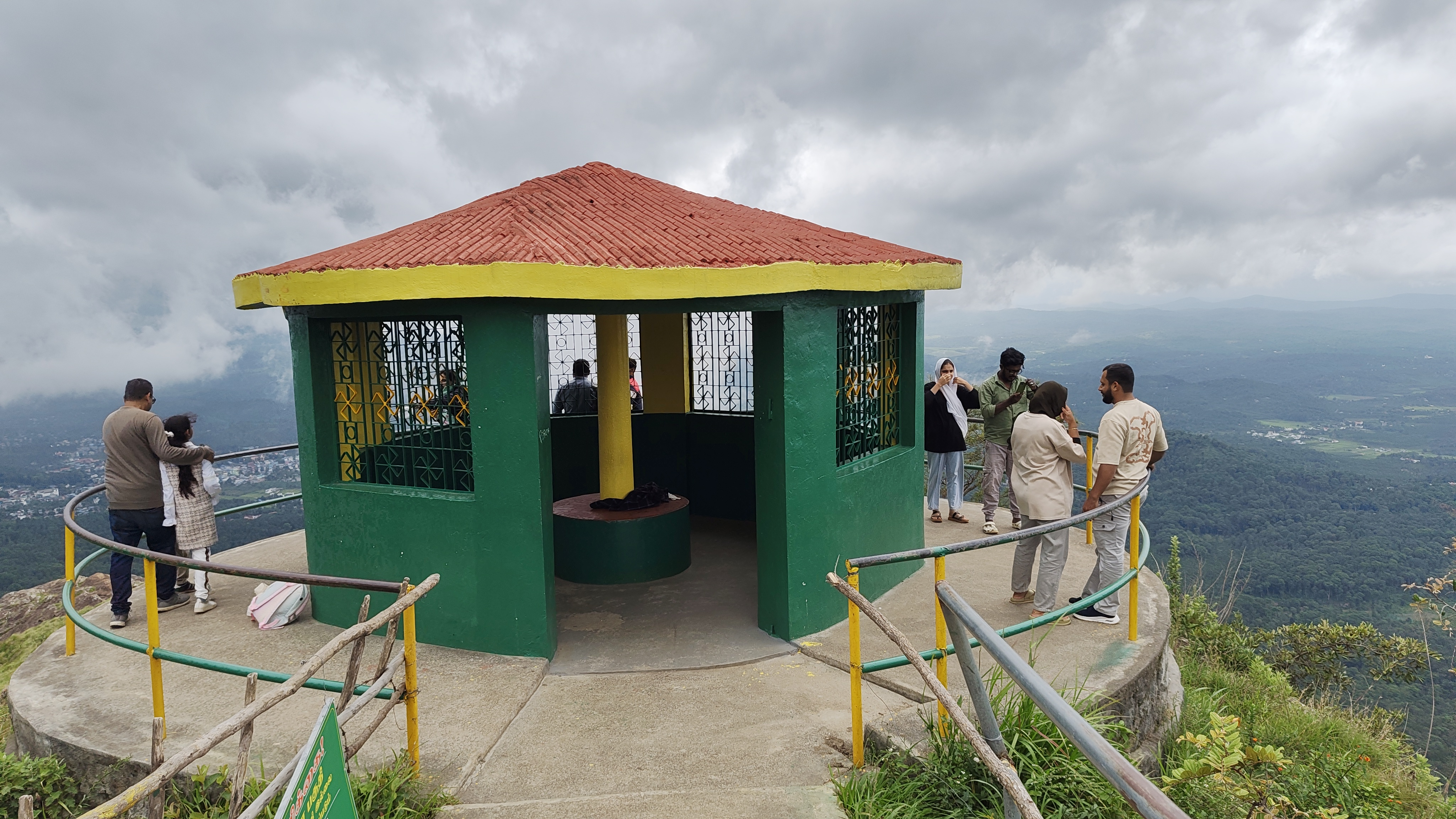
View point building

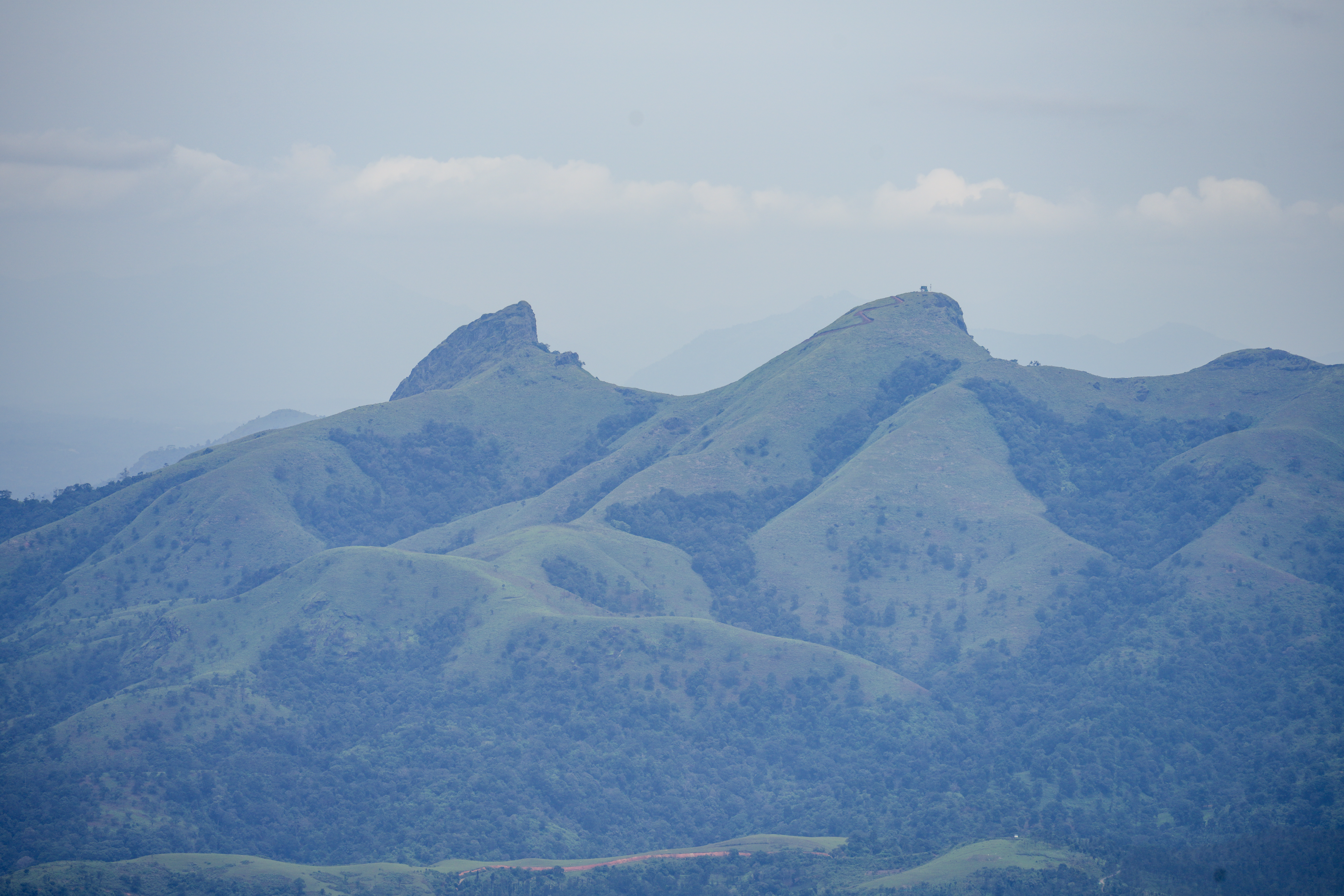
Needle Rock (left) and Morapu Malai (right)

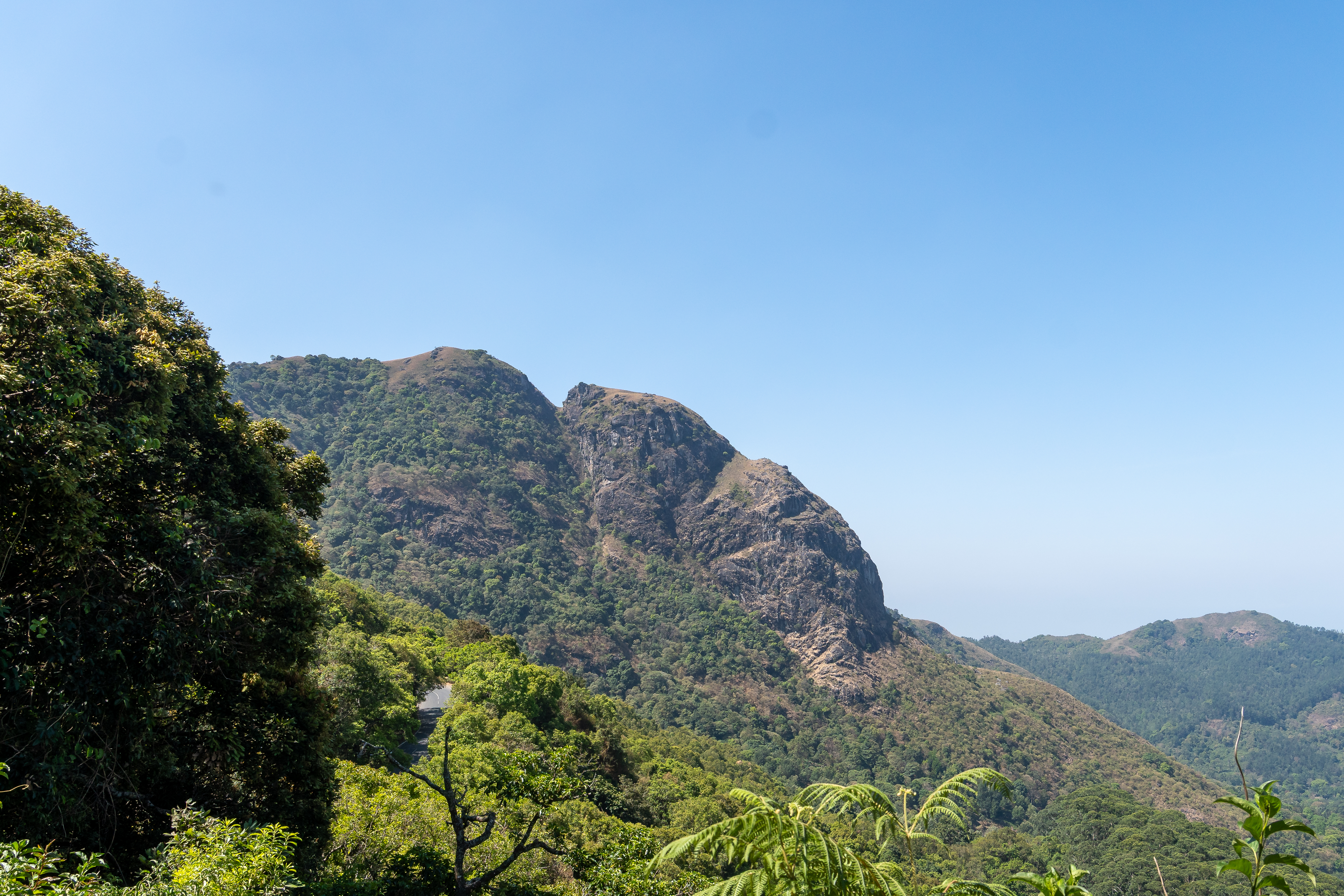
Frog Hill above Gudalur, from Needle Rock View Point

Needle Rock View Point is a tourist spot in Gudalur, The Nilgiris, Tamil Nadu. Where Gudalur is located 51 km (32 mi) on the west of Ooty and the Needle Rock viewpoint is about 8 km (5.0 mi) from Gudalur on the way from Ooty on National Highway 181. One Kilo metre trek is required to reach this view point from the main road. The view point gives you a 360 degree view. Wilson Pine plantations, Frog Hill, Kokkal Hill, Rockwood hills, Silver Cloud Tea Estates, Gudalur Town and the Mudumalai Forest can be seen from this view point. The peak to the west beyond Gudalur is known as Needle Rock. In Tamil, it is called Oosi Malai; in Tamil, Oosi means needle and Malai means mountain.

== In culture ==
It is a shooting range for several Tamil films. Needle Rock View Point is clearly visible in Chinna Poove Mella Pesu, a popular Tamil film.

== See also ==
- Frog Hill View Point
- Mudumalai Wildlife Sanctuary
- Gudalur
- Pykara
