= Thandavapura =

- village
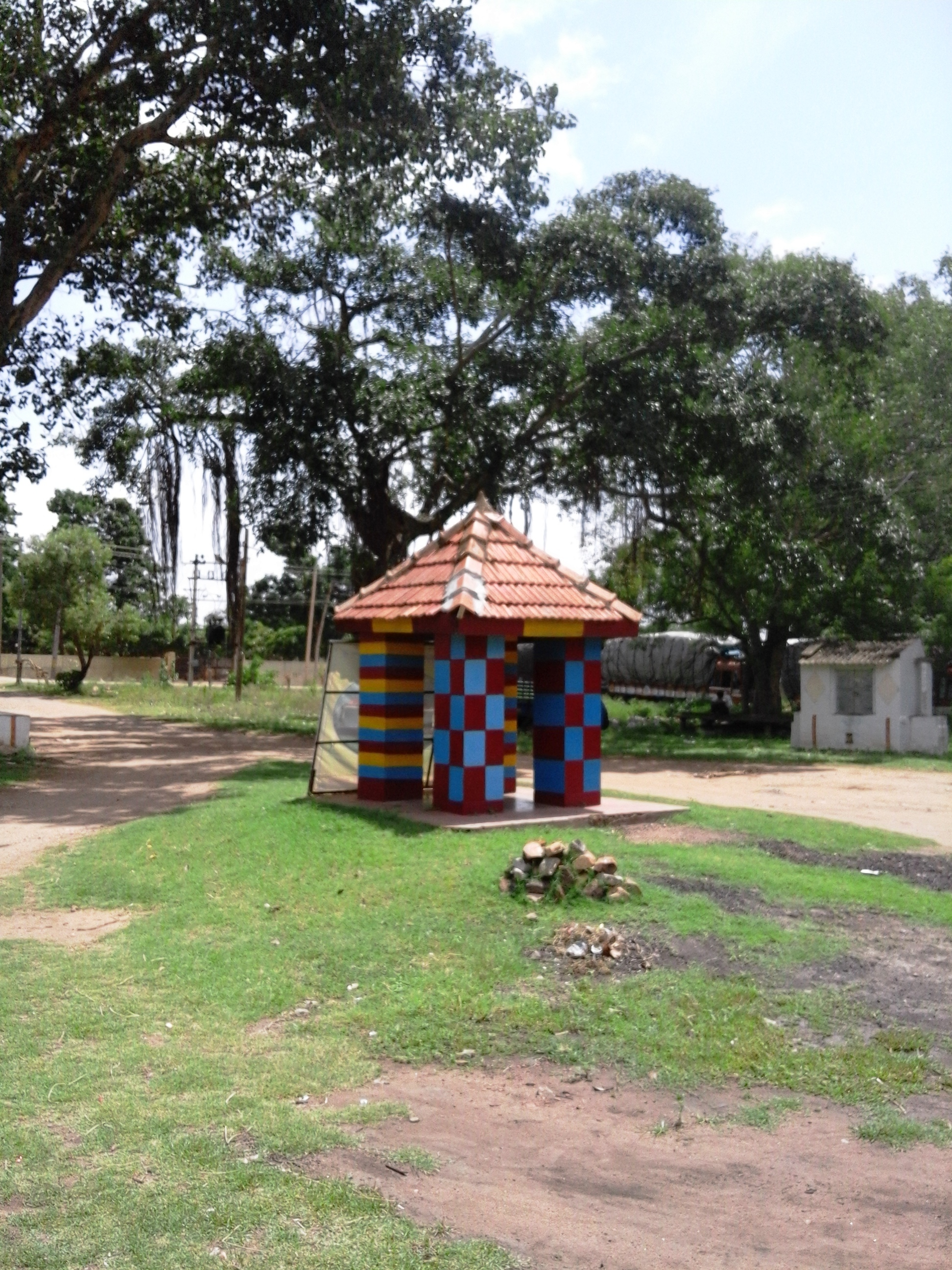
- Agni Nethramba Temple
- Interactive map of Thandavapura
- Coordinates: 12°10′04″N 76°40′38″E
- Country: India
- State: Karnataka
- District: Mysore
- Talukas: Nanjangud

Government
  - Body: Gram panchayat

Population (2001)
  - Total: 5,156

Languages
  - Official: Kannada
- Time zone: UTC+5:30 (IST)
- ISO 3166 code: IN-KA
- Vehicle registration: KA
- Website: karnataka.gov.in

Thandavapura is a village in the southern state of Karnataka, India. It is located in the Nanjangud taluk of Mysore district in Karnataka.

== Demographics ==
As of 2001 India census, Thandavapura had a population of 5156 with 2722 males and 2434 females.

== Transportation ==
The village has its own railway station where only two slow trains stop. Trains are available from Mysore at 4.50 am, 7.10 am, 8.50 am, 12.20pm, 2.40pm and 1.40pm. The nearest major railway station is Mysore. Buses are easily available to Nanjangud and Chamarajanagar towns.

== Education ==
A government primary and high school are present in the village. There is also an engineering college, 'Maharaja Institute of Technology Thandavapura (MITT)', located here.

== Image gallery ==
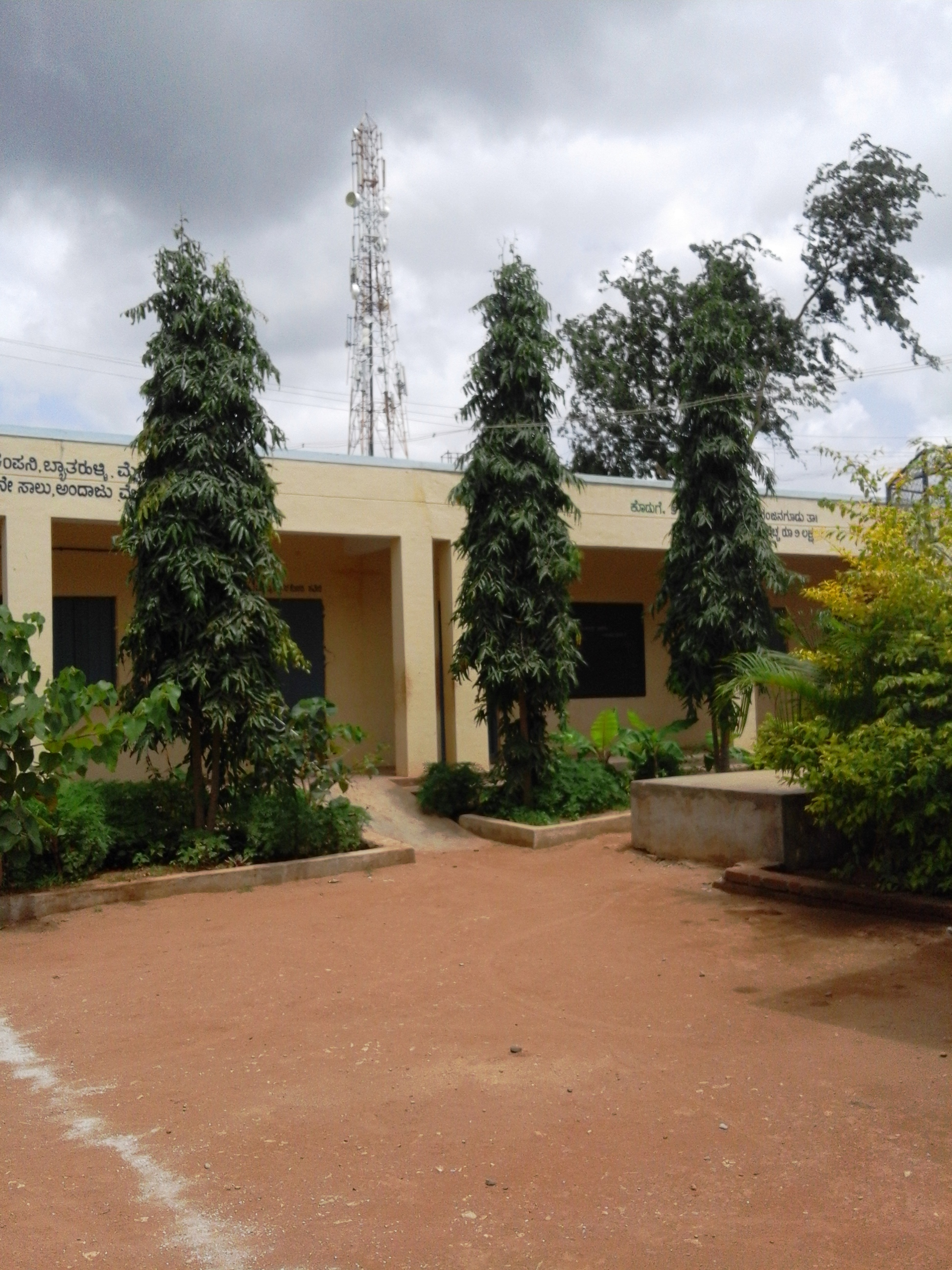
Proudashala School

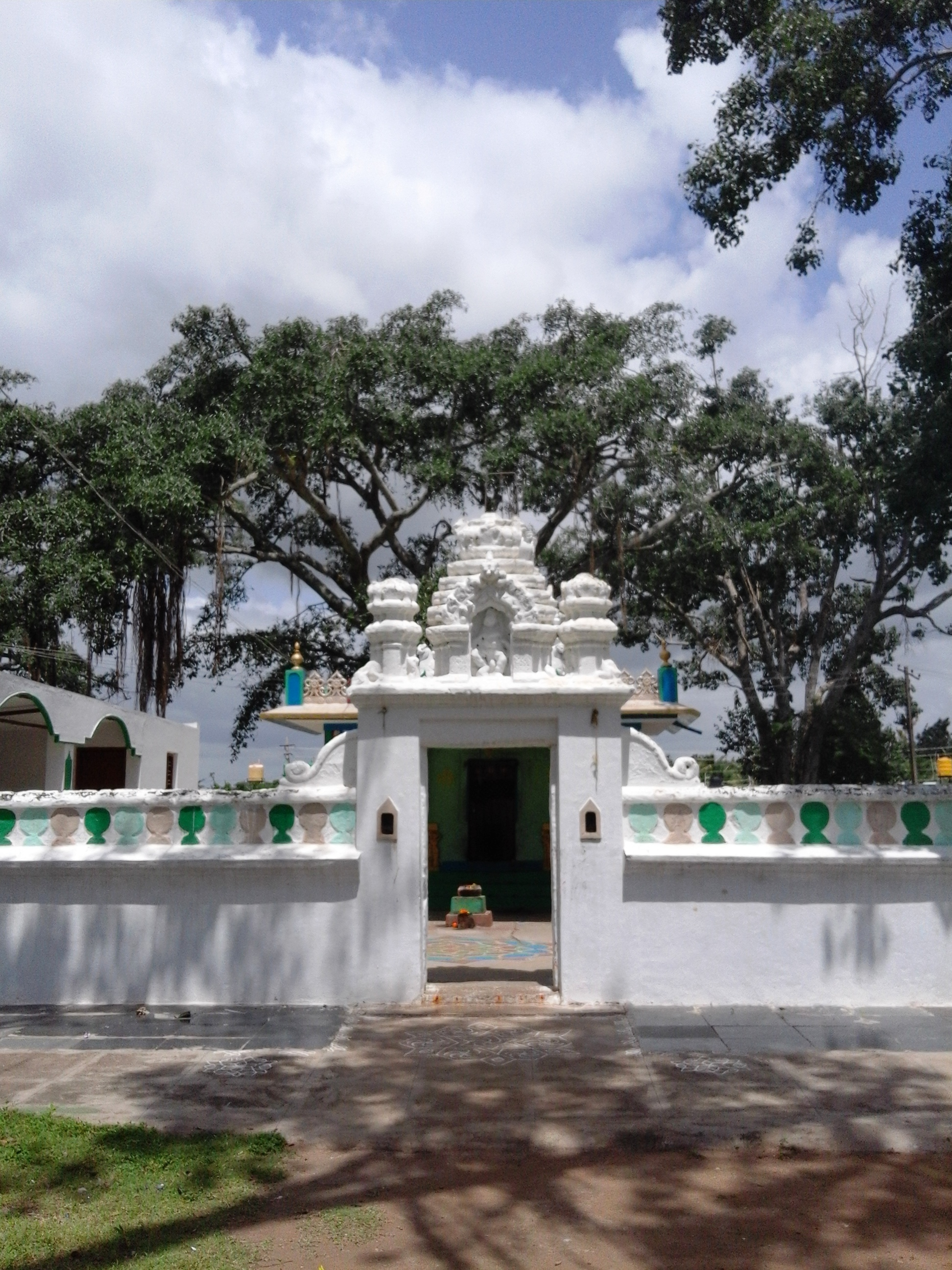
Narayana Swamy Temple

== See also ==
- Kadakola
- Sujatha Puram Halt
- Nanjangud Town
- Chinnada Gudi Hundi
