= Sujathapuram =

Village in India

Coordinates: 12.136035°N 76.674249°E

Sujathapuram is a village in Mysore district of Karnataka state, India.

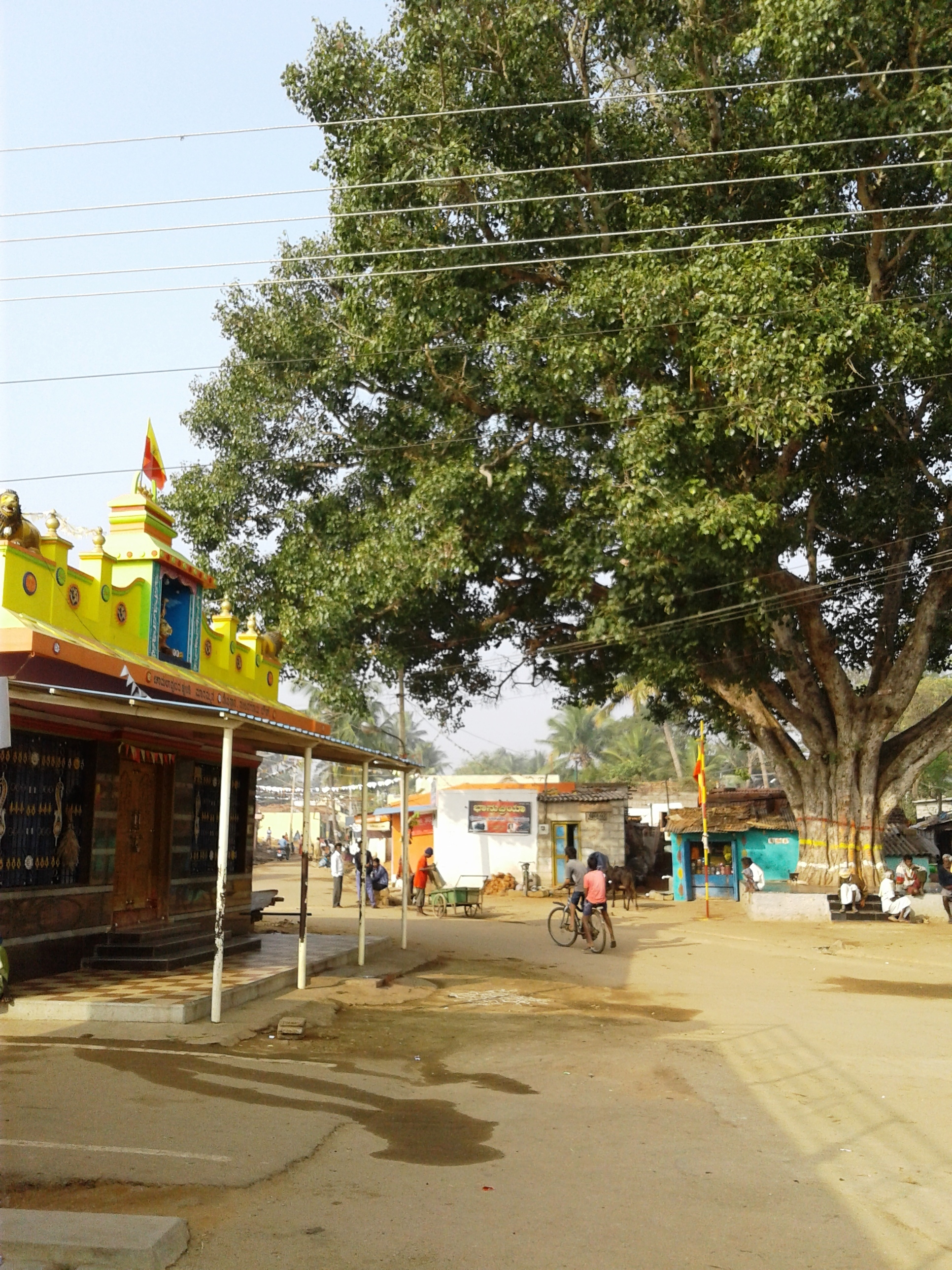
Chamalapura Village

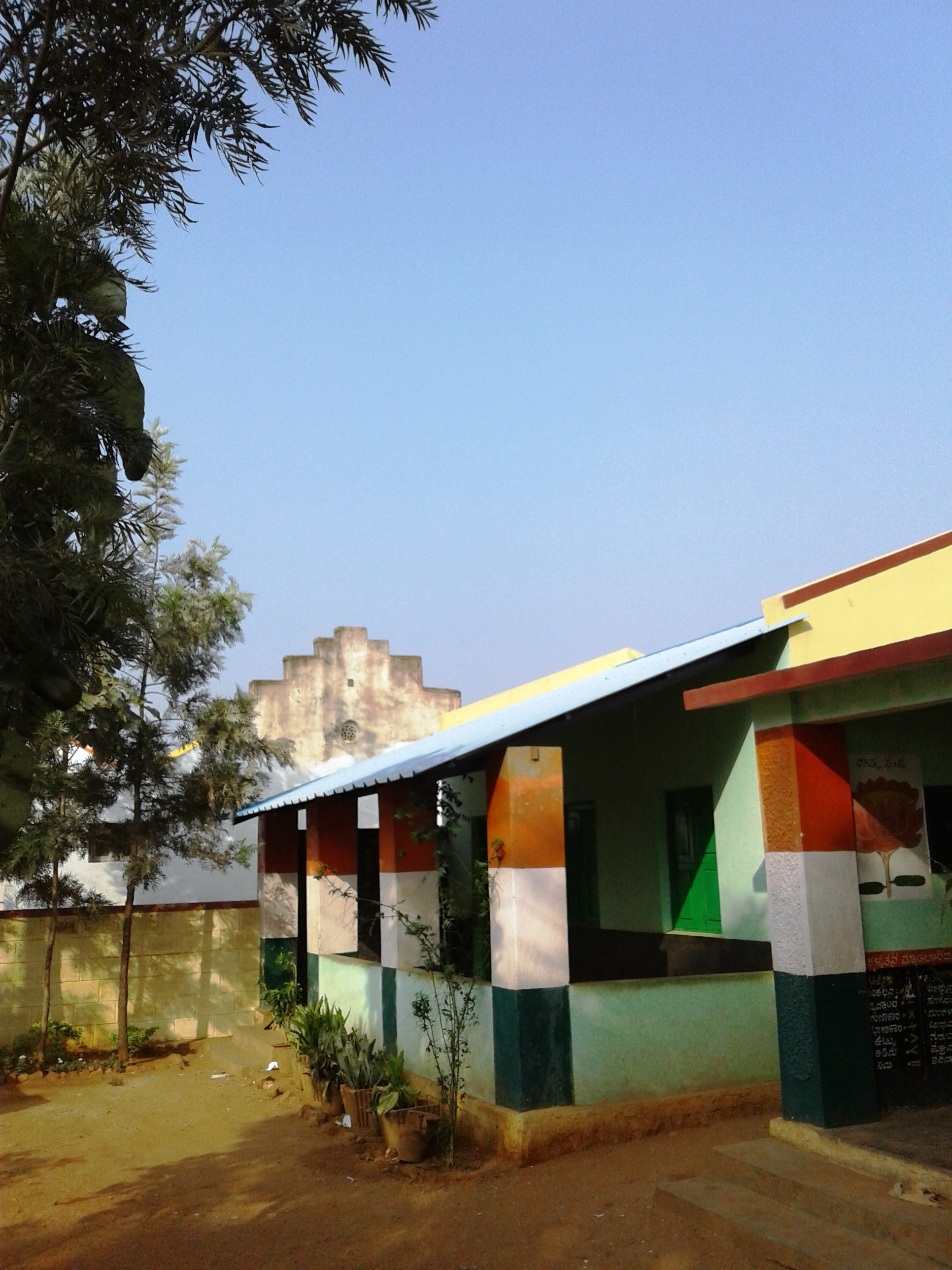
Korehundi Village

== Location ==
Sujathapuram is located some 2.6 km north of Nanjangud town near Mysore city. Kabini river flows through Sujathapuram village.

== Villages and suburbs ==
- Chamlapurada Hundi layout 0.6 km
- Nanjangud Industrial Estate 3 km
- Doddakanya - Ainsley Wilson 5.4 km
- Tata Iron and Steel Mines 5.6 km
- Kadakola village 6.7 km
- Byathalli village 7.2 km
- Korehundi village

== Post office ==
Sujathapruam village has a post office and the postal code is 571302.

== Access ==
Sujathapuram has a railway station on Mysore–Chamarajanagar branch line. There are six trains running forward and backward in this route. Five of them are slow moving passenger trains. One express train to Bangalore is also available.

== Image gallery ==
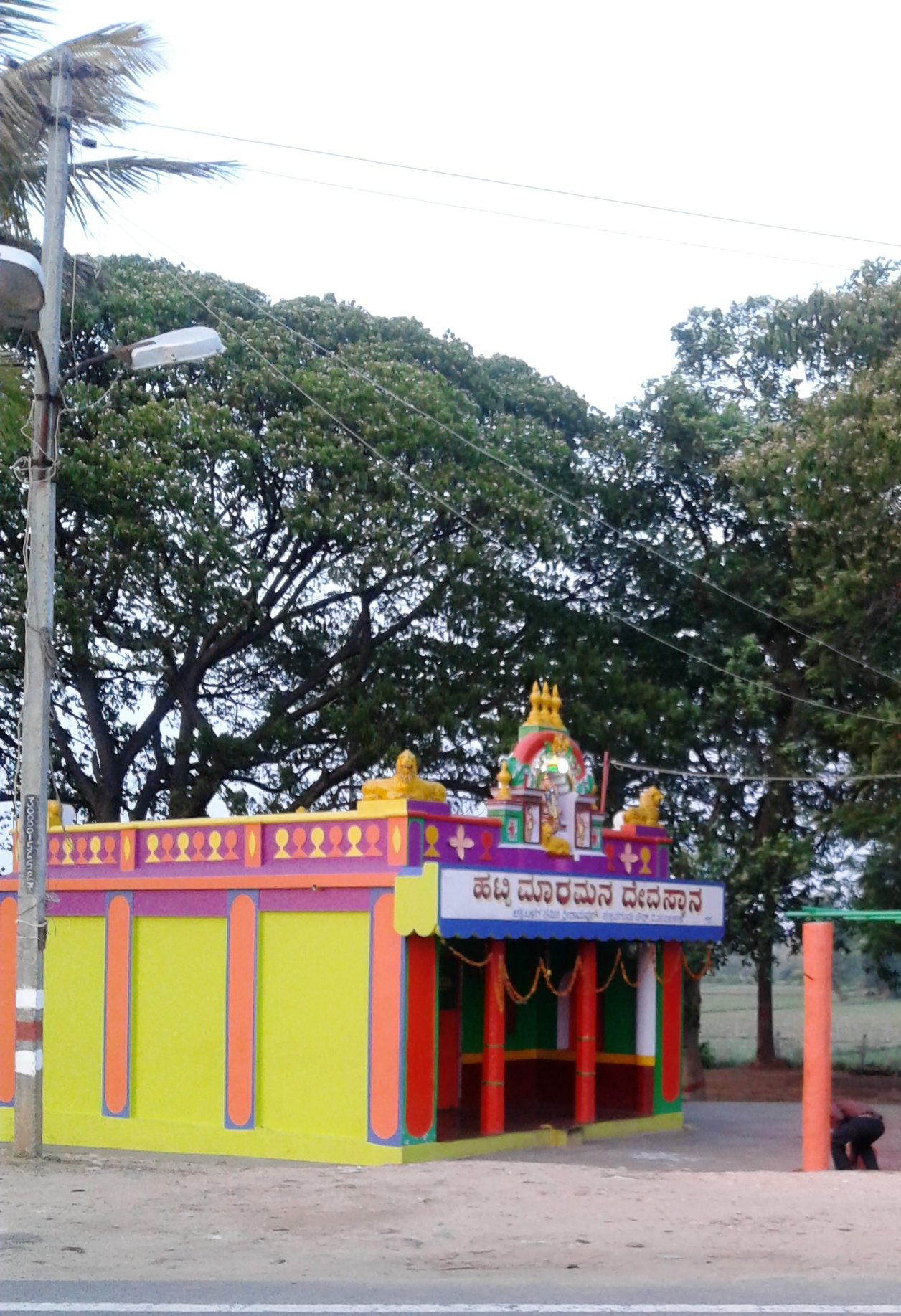
Maramma temple on the bypass

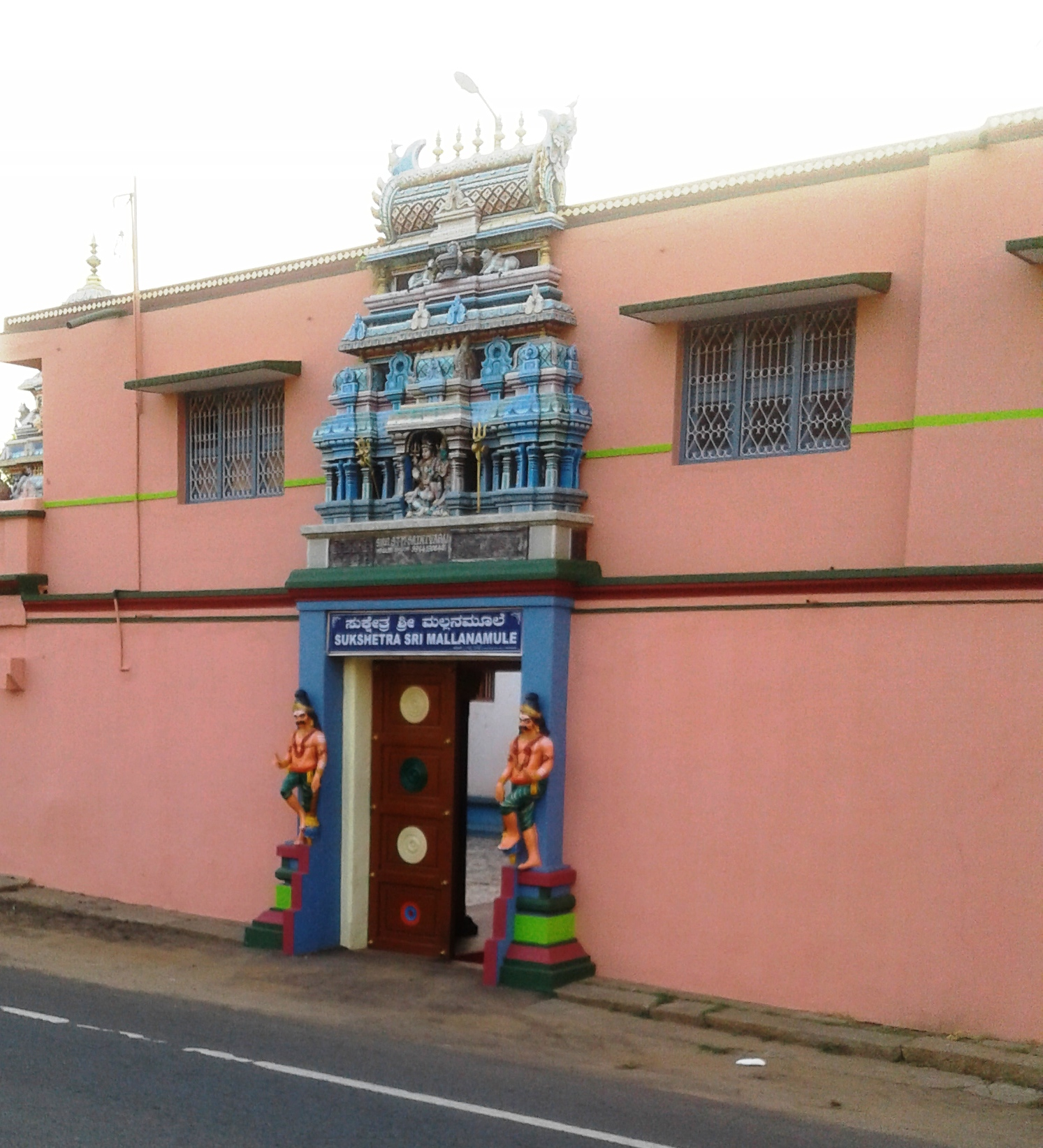
Mallanmule Math on Mysore Road

Sujathapuram-Railway-Station

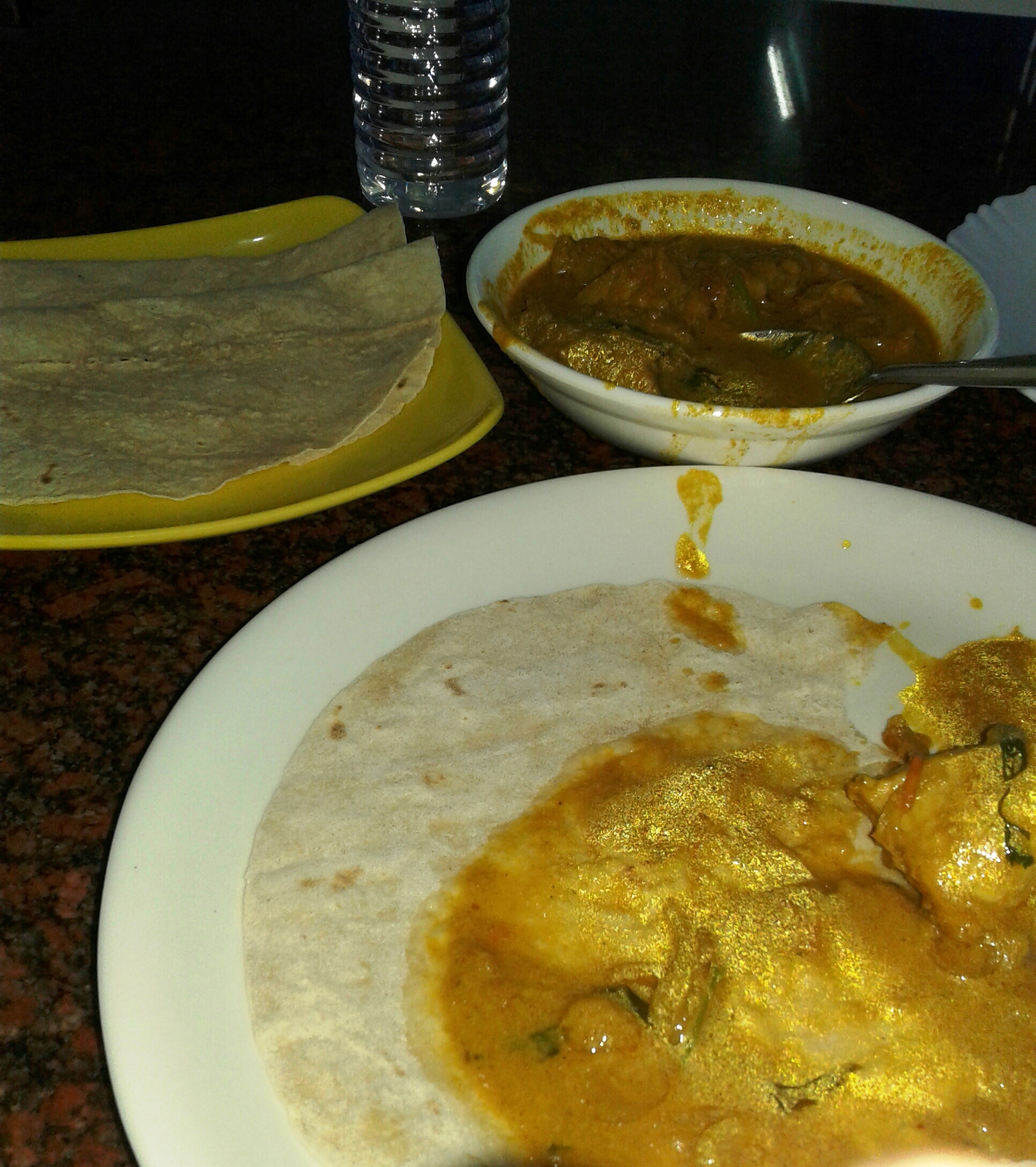
Chapatti and chicken is the popular food here

== See also ==
- Kadakola
- Thandavapura
- Nanjangud Town
- Chinnada Gudi Hundi
