= National Highway 181 (India) =

National highway in India

National Highway 181
- Map of National Highway 181 in red

Route information
- Length: 216 km (134 mi)

Major junctions
- North end: Gundlupet, Karnataka
- South end: Coimbatore, Tamil Nadu

Location
- Country: India
- States: Tamil Nadu: 156 km (97 mi); Karnataka: 60 km (37 mi)
- Primary destinations: Coimbatore - Mettupalayam - Udhagamandalam - Gundlupet

Highway system
- Roads in India; Expressways; National; State; Asian
← NH 179A	→ NH 183

National Highway 181, commonly referred to as NH 181, (Earlier NH-67) is a highway connecting the city of Coimbatore in Tamil Nadu to Gundlupete in Karnataka state, South India. It starts at the junction of National Highway 766 (India) at Gundlupete town in Chamarajanagara district of Karnataka state. The city of Mysuru is connected to Ooty by road via Nanjanagudu, Gundlupete, Bandipur and Gudalur. The national highway 181 passes through Bandipur Tiger Reserve (National Park) and Mudumalai Tiger Reserve, hence vehicular traffic is restricted at night from 9 p.m to 6 a.m. Wild animals like elephants, bison, bears, tiger, and leopards can be spotted sometimes on this highway in the tiger reserve stretches. NH 181 after Ooty goes to Coonoor, Mettupalayam, Karamadai and ends in Coimbatore city.There are many Forest check post on this highway.

Highway Number	Source	Destination	Via
181	Coimbatore	Gundlupet	Karamadai, Mettupalayam, Coonoor, Udagamandalam, Gudalur, Mudumalai Tiger Reserve (Theppakadu).

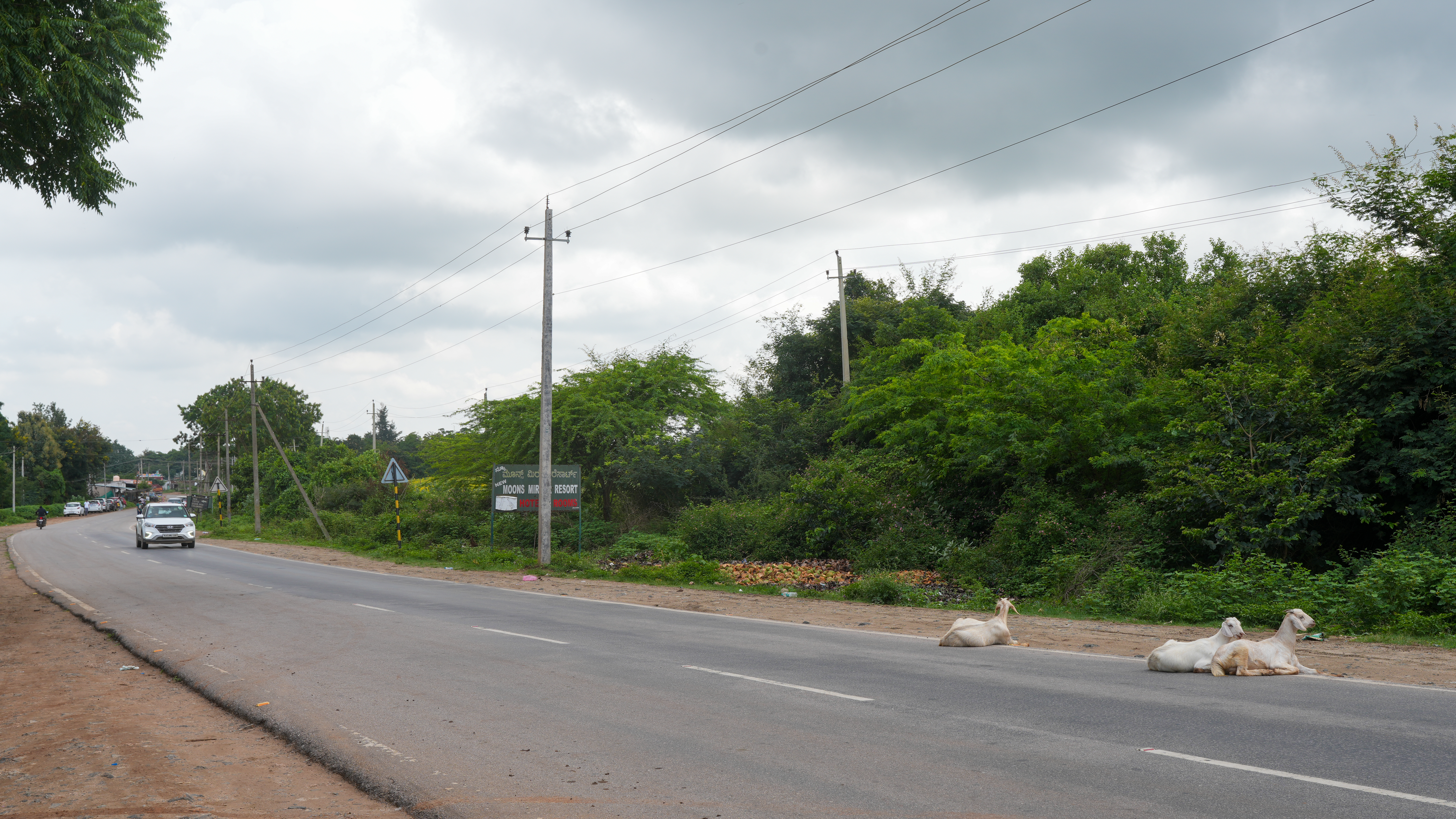
NH 181 between Bandipur and Gundlepet

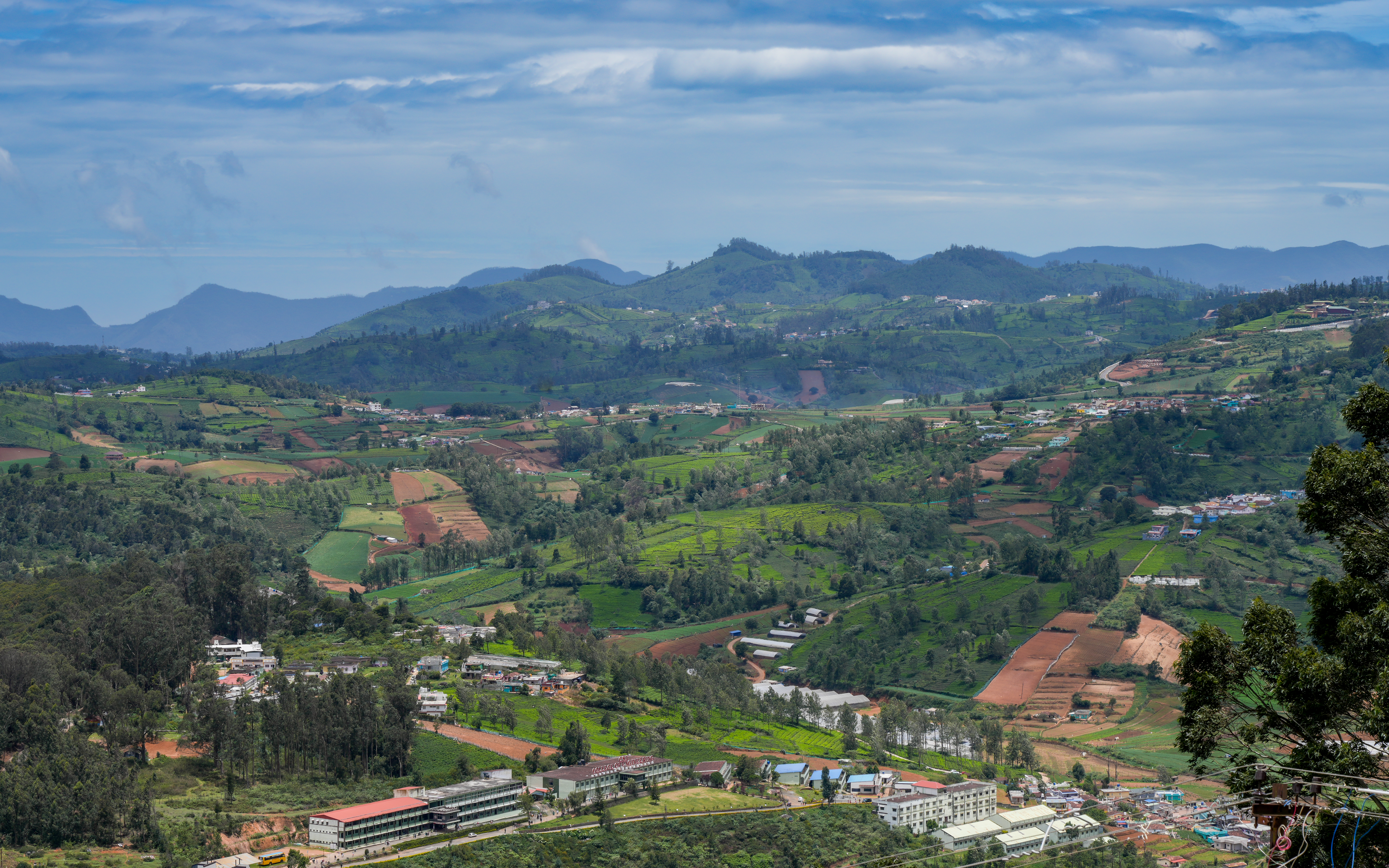
Ketti valley between Ooty and Coonoor

== See also ==
- National Highway 766 (India)
- National Highway 948 (India)
- Mysore-Ooty Road
