= Frog Hill View Point =

Tourist spot above Gudalur, Nilgiris, Tamil Nadu

Coordinates: 11.4991711°N 76.5187653°E

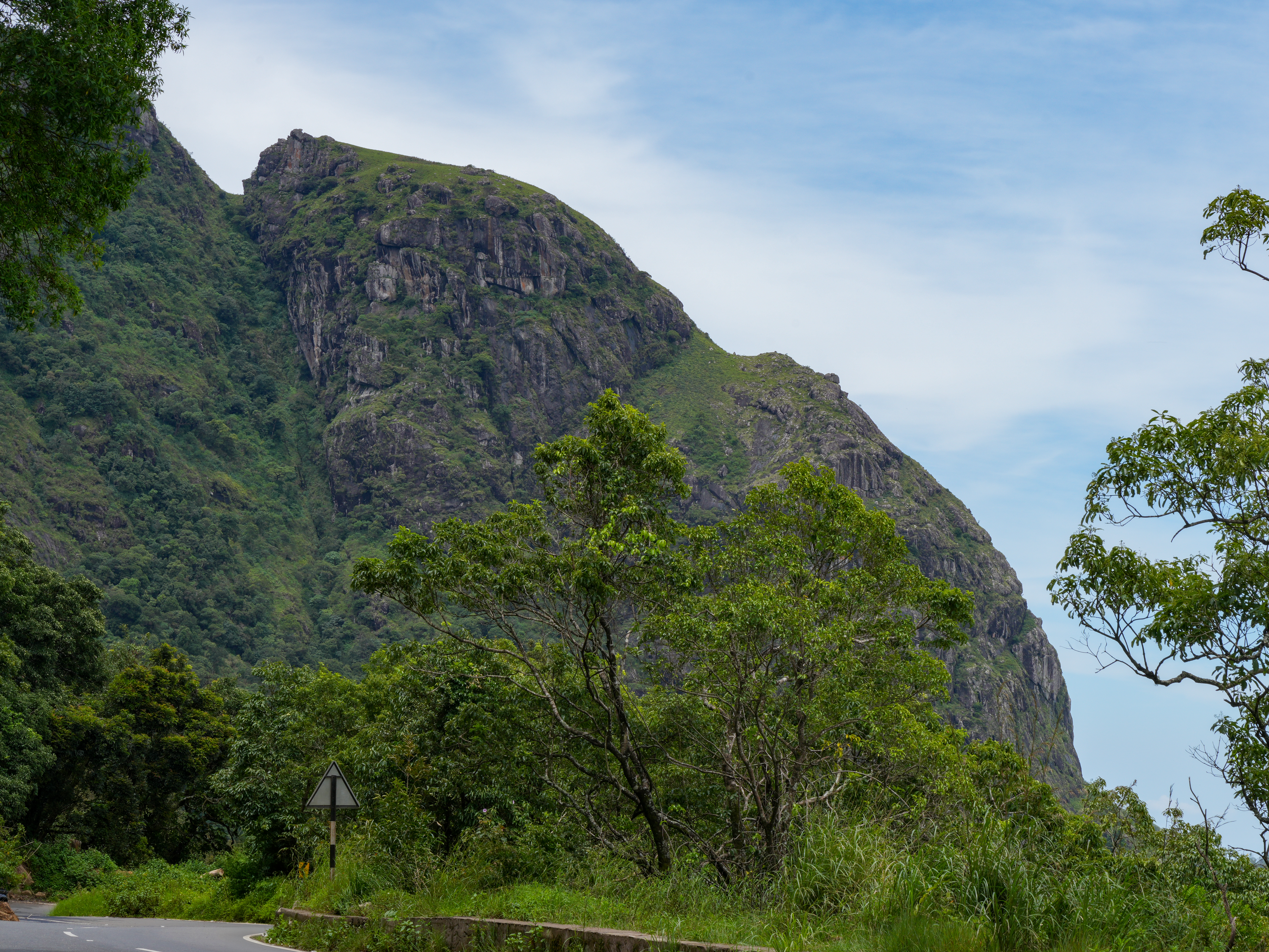
Frog Hill above the Gudalur valley

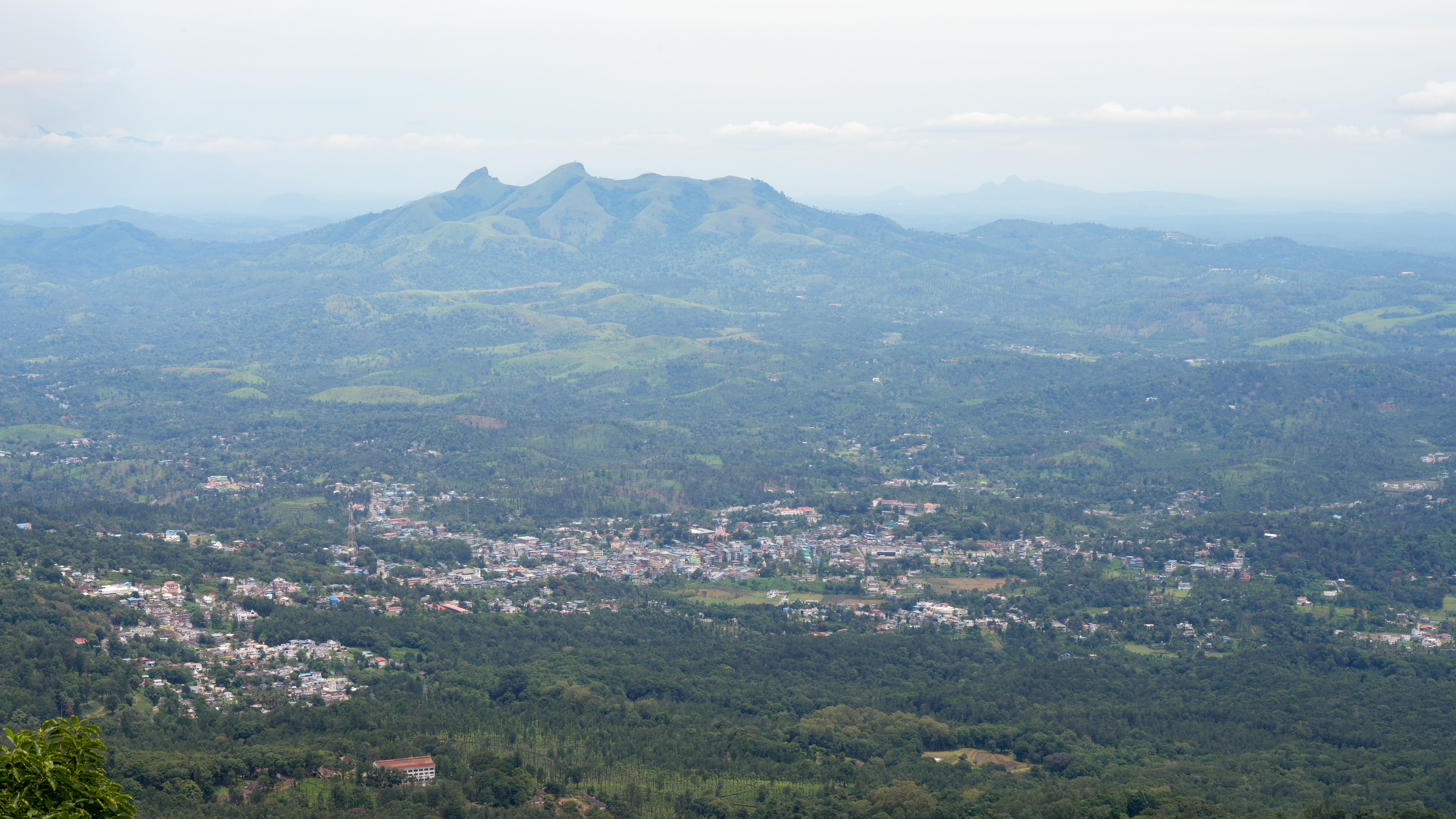
Needle rock and Gudalur valley from the view point

Frog Hill View Point (also Valley View Point) is a tourist spot above Gudalur, Nilgiris district, Tamil Nadu, India. It is about 12 km (7.5 mi) from Gudalur on NH 181 from Ooty to Gudalur.

== See also ==
- Mudumalai Wildlife Sanctuary
- Gudalur
- Pykara
- Needle Rock View Point
