= Chinnadagudihundi =

Chinnada Gudi Hundi
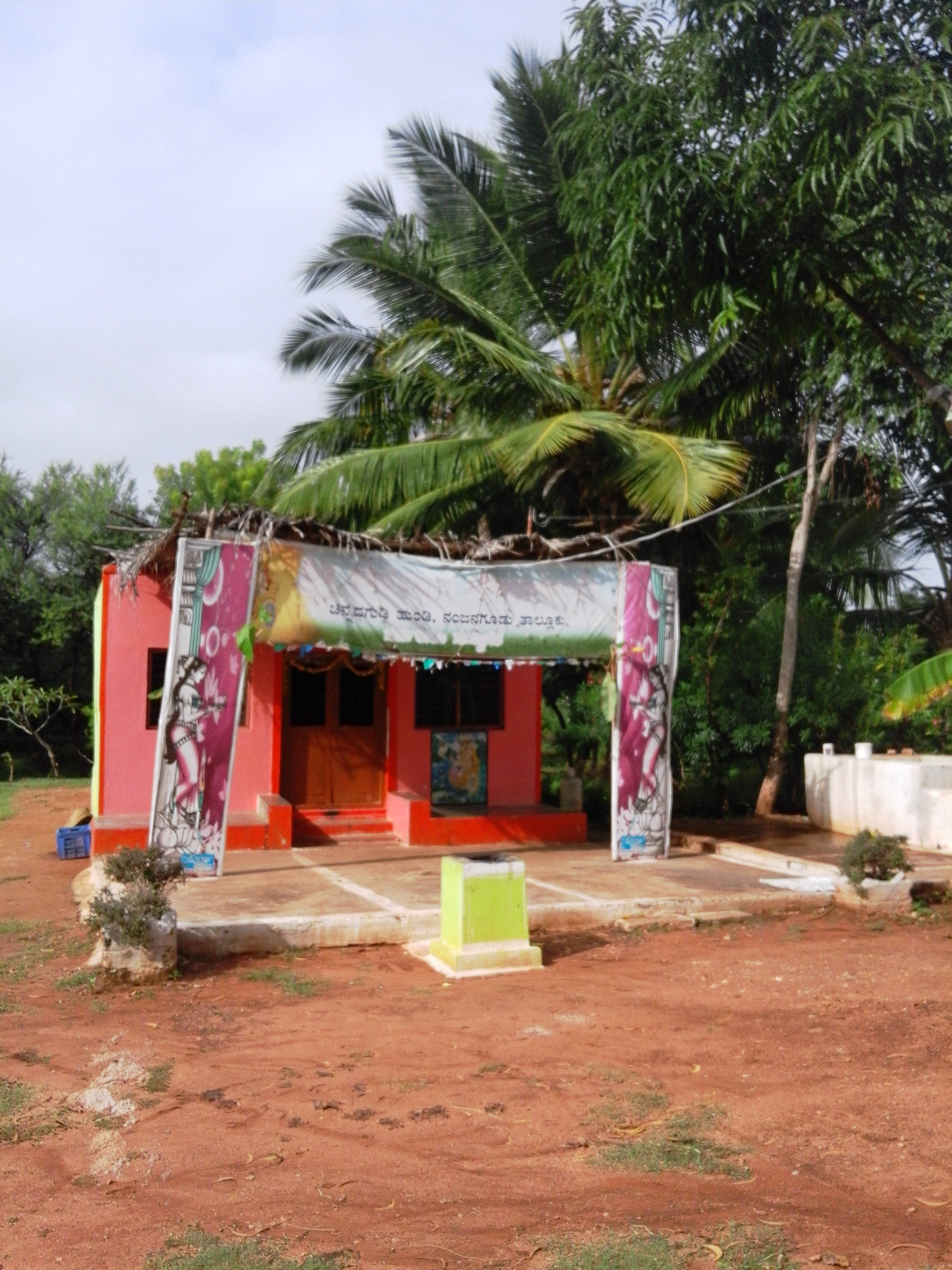
- Saneshwara Temple
- Interactive map of Chinnada Gudi Hundi
- Coordinates: 12.087377°N 76.732931°E
- Country: India
- State: Karnataka
- District: Mysore
- Time zone: UTC+5:30 (IST)
- PIN: 571312
- Vehicle registration: KA

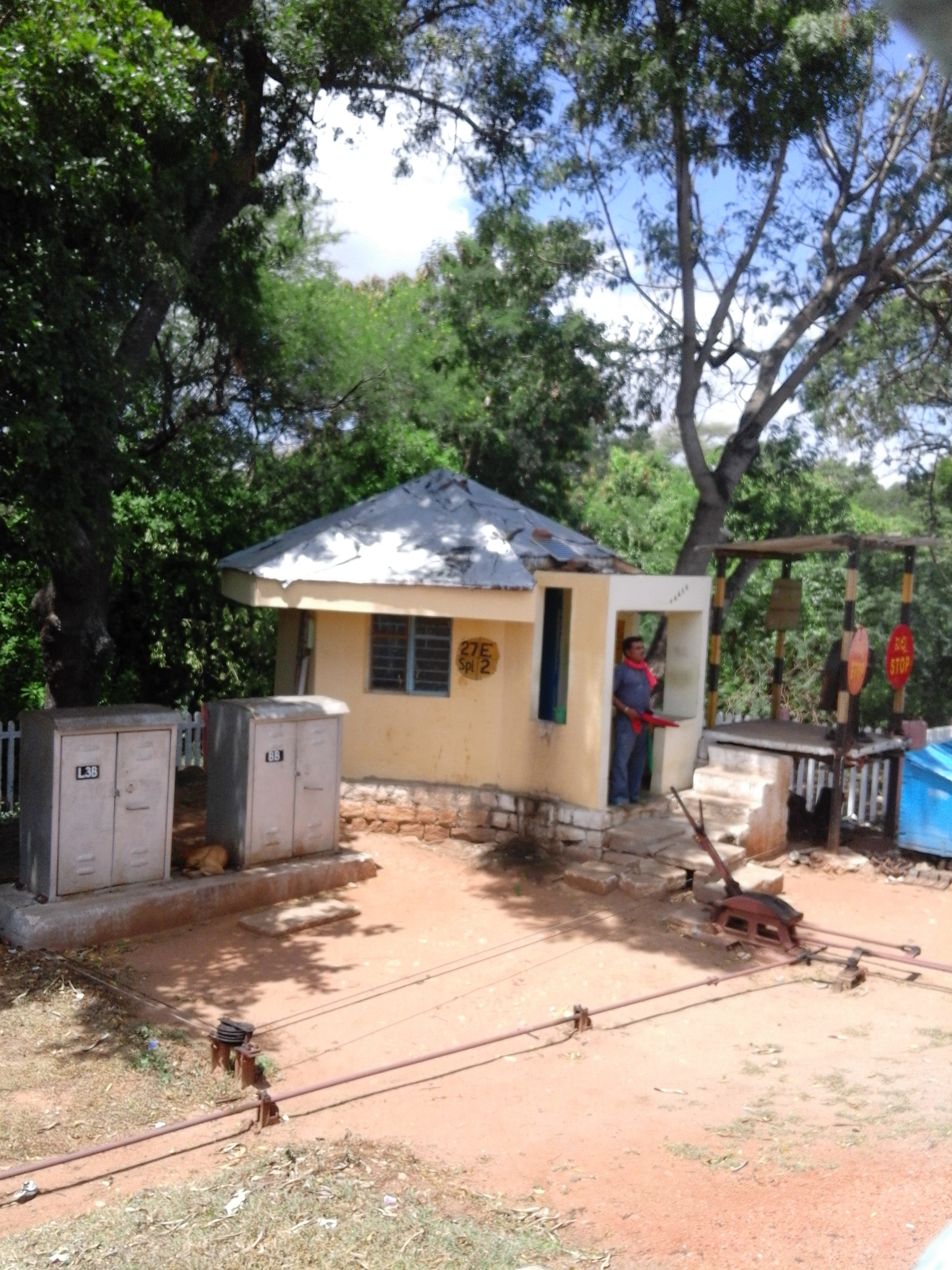
Chinnadagudihundi Level Cross

Chinnadagudihundi is a village in Mysore district, Karnataka, India.

== Situation ==
Chinnadaguddihundi is located 8 kilometres (5.0 mi) southeast of Nanjangud in the Mysore district. The village is located by the highway between Nanjangud and Chamarajanagar.

== Economy ==
Most of the villagers are employed in the agricultural sector, growing their own crops. There are five provision stores and two tea shops in the village. It has no restaurants or lodges.

== Transportation ==
Chinnadagudihundi railway station is on the Mysore–Chamarajanagar branch line. This station is the closest to Chinnadagudihundi.

The nearest major railway station is Mysore Junction.

== See also ==
- Sujatha Puram Halt
- Nanjangud Town
- Badanavalu
- Narasam Budhi

== Image gallery ==
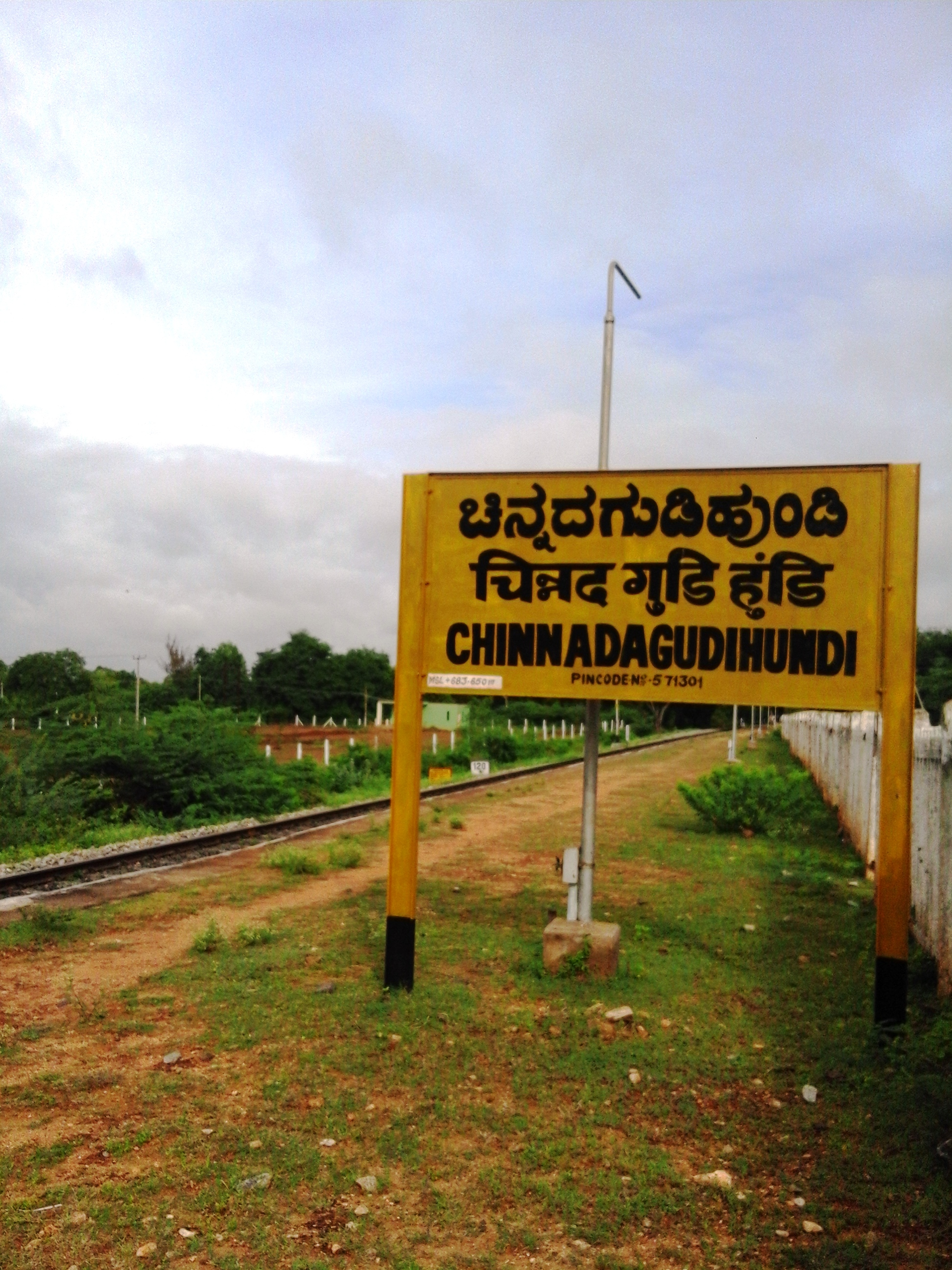
Chinnadagudihundi Halt

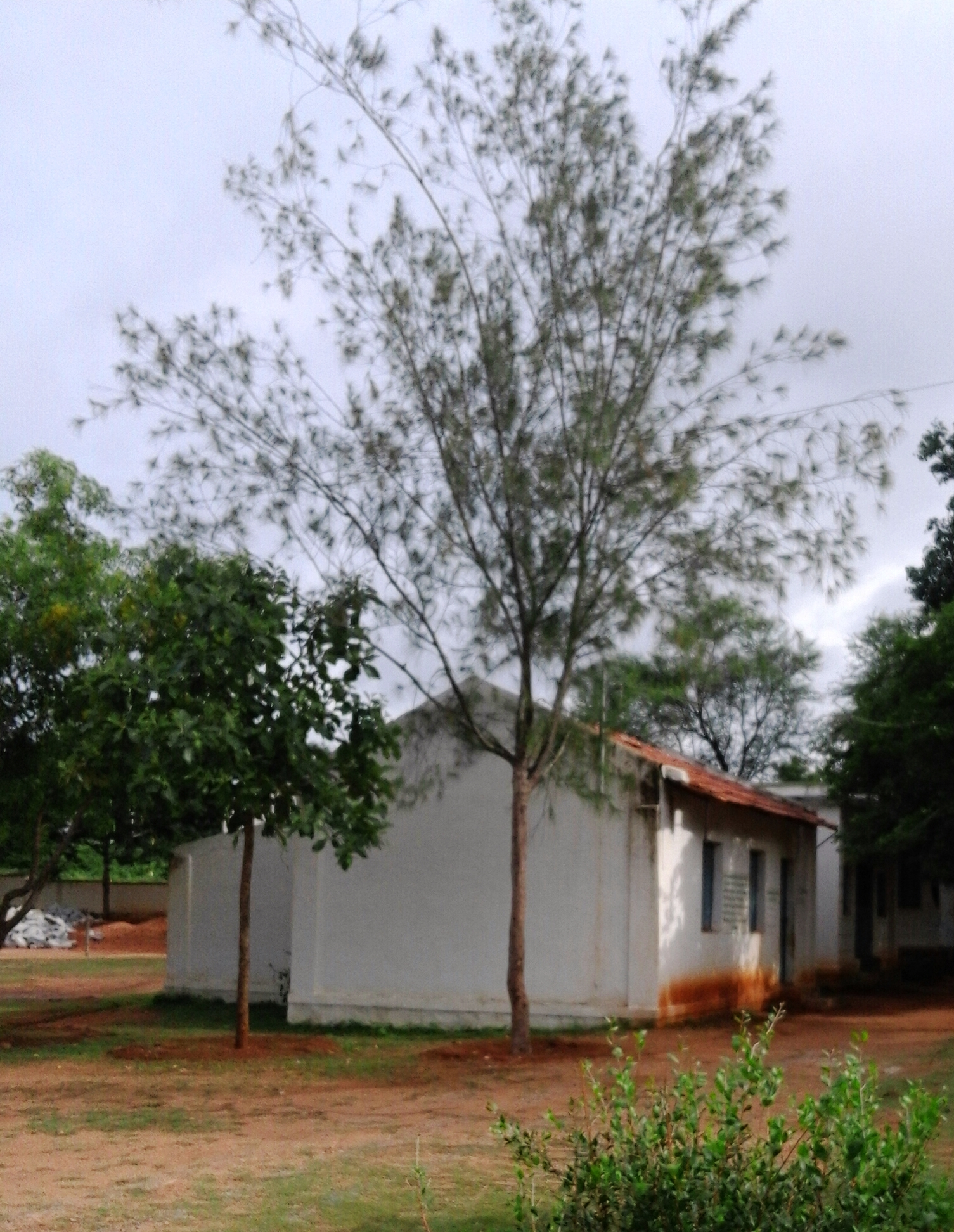
School at Chinnadagudihundi

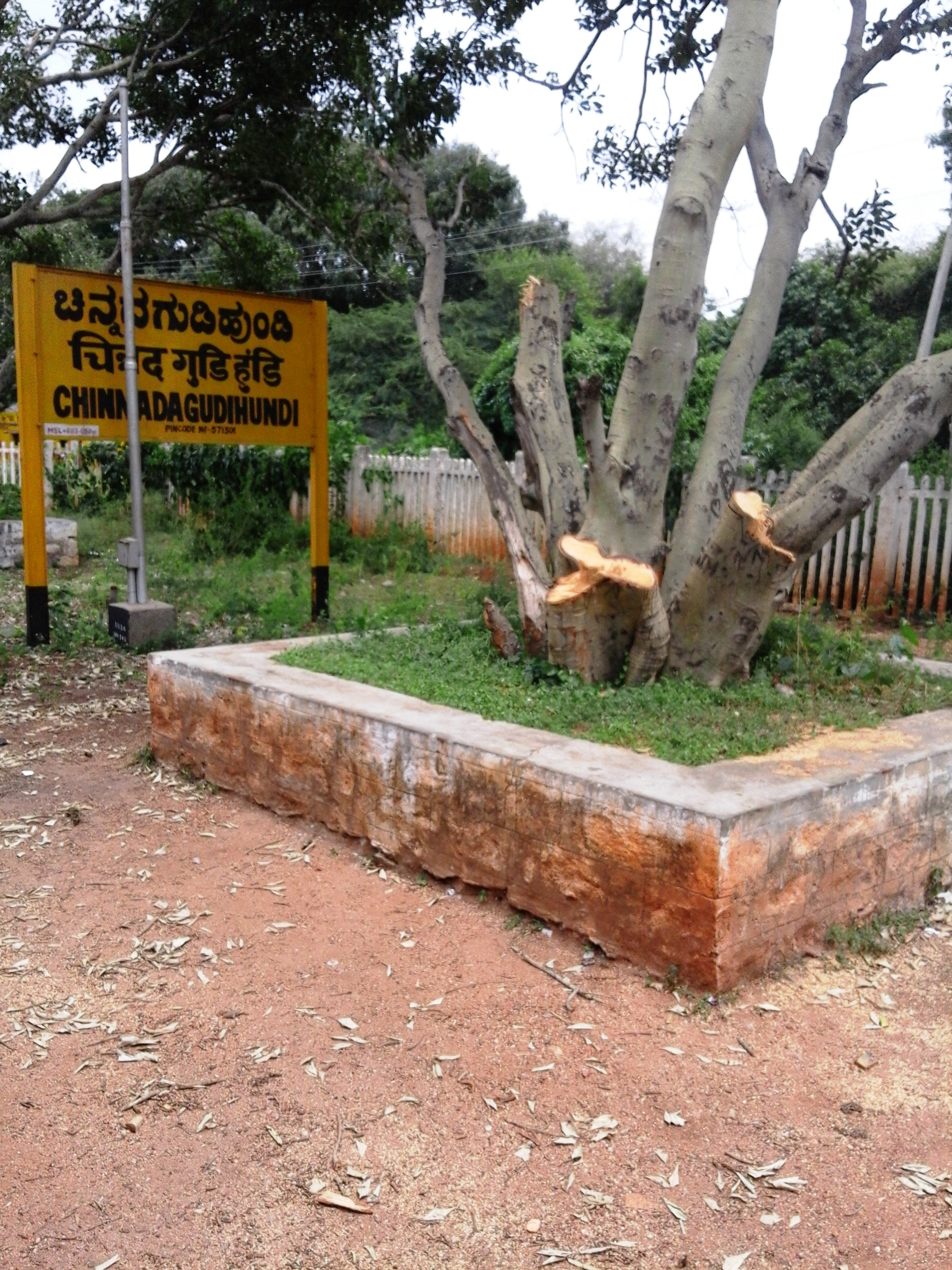
C.H.Hundi Halt
