= Adakanahalli =

- village
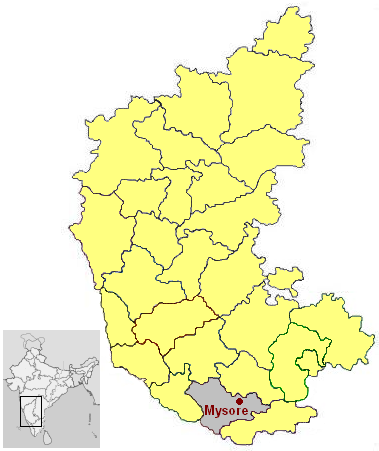
- Adakanahalli is in Mysore district
- Interactive map of Adakanahalli
- Coordinates: 12.1704°N 76.6857°E
- Country: India
- State: Karnataka
- District: Mysore
- Talukas: Nanjangud

Government
  - Body: Village Panchayat

Languages
  - Official: Kannada
- Time zone: UTC+5:30 (IST)
- ISO 3166 code: IN-KA
- Vehicle registration: KA
- Nearest city: Mysore
- Civic agency: Village Panchayat
- Website: karnataka.gov.in

Adakanahalli is a village in the southern state of Karnataka, India. It is located in the Nanjangud taluk of Mysore district.

== 2016 Scout camp ==
In 2016, Adakanahalli received 30,000 visitors who came to attend a national Scouts and Guides camp.

== See also ==
- Mysore
- Districts of Karnataka
