= Srikanteshwara Temple, Nanjangud =

Temple

Nanjundeshwara Temple
- ನಂಜುಂಡೇಶ್ವರ ದೇವಸ್ಥಾನ
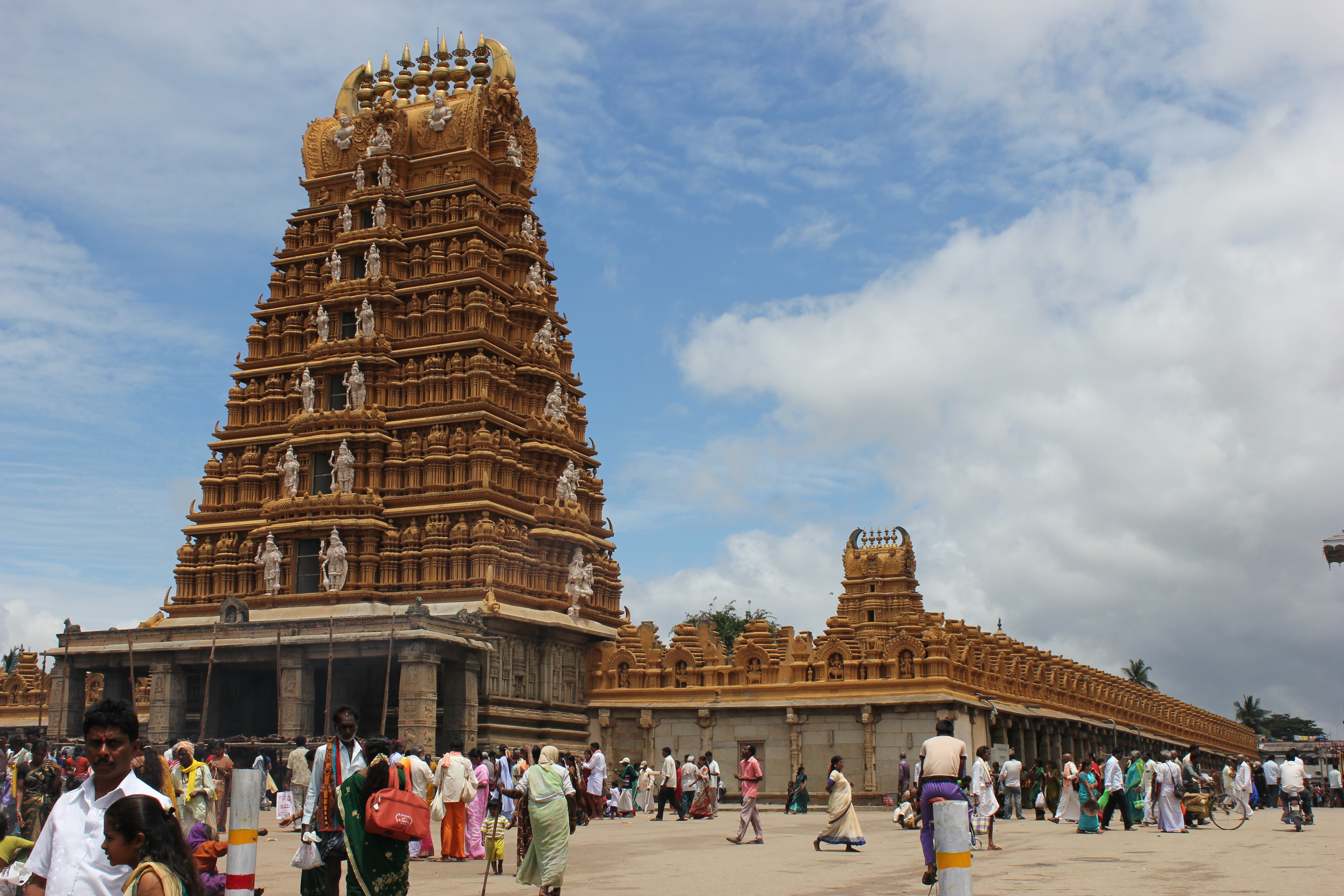

Religion
- Affiliation: Hinduism
- District: Mysore
- Deity: Nanjundeshwara Swami (Shiva)

Location
- Location: Nanjanagudu
- State: Karnataka
- Country: India
- Interactive map of Nanjundeshwara Temple
- Coordinates: 12°7′8″N 76°41′33″E

Architecture
- Type: Temple

Website
- https://nanjangudtemple.kar.nic.in

The Nanjundeshwara Temple (also called Srikanteshwara Temple) is an ancient temple dedicated to Shiva in the Hindu pilgrimage town of Nanjanagudu in Karnataka, India. It is located on the right bank of the Kapila River (also known as the Kabini River), a tributary of the Kaveri River, a tributary of the Kaveri River. Nanjanagudu is also known as The "Dakshina Kashi" or "Kashi of South".

Nanju in Kannada means "poison". The name Nanjundeshwara means the "God who Drank the Poison" (halāhala, a word that has its origins in the legend of the Great Churning of the Ocean of Milk); thus, the town got the name "Nanjanagudu" which means "the abode of the god Nanjundeshwara".

The temple's Dodda Jaathre festival attracts thousands of devotees. The festivities in the fair include five colorful chariots pulled by devotees on a path called the ratha beedi. Another notable feature of the temple complex is a large stone Nandi (bull), approximately eight feet in height, installed by Dalavayi Vikramaraya in 1644. Parasurama Temple is near Nanjundeshwara Temple.

The gopuram (gateway tower), 120 feet tall and built by Devarajammanni, wife of Krishnaraja Wadiyar III in 1845, the temple complex measures 385 feet by 160 feet, covering a total area of 50,000 square feet, making it one of the largest temples in Karnataka. Is described by various sources as having either seven or nine tiers in the Dravidian style. It is crowned by seven gold-plated kalashas, each approximately three metres tall.

== History ==
Nanjungud is mentioned as Sri Garalapuri, in the Shiva Purana. It is said that the legendary holy place is the abode of Shiva in southern India. It is also referred to as "Dakshina Kasi", where the god appeared at the plea of his devotees, the Devas, and sage Narada. The demon Keshi obtained a boon from Brahma and Vishnu by which they would not be able to kill him. He assumed that with this boon, he was as good as immortal and began troubling the people, the Devas, and the sages. At last, Narada and the Devas pleaded with Shiva to save everyone. He appeared in Garalapuri Sri Kshetra (present Nanjungud) and killed Keshi. He further assured that his Ansh (a part of his divine self) would always remain here and bless humanity; the place henceforth would be a papa vinashini ('remover of sins'). After bathing in the holy river of Kabini, every human praying to Lord Srikanteshwara or Nanjundeshwara (Shiva) of Nanjungud would be rid of sins and blessed by the god.

Sage Parashuram, after beheading his mother as per his father Sage Jamadagni's orders, wanted to undo his sins from "Matru Hatya" (his mother's murder). Per Narada's advice, he reached Garalapuri (Nanjangud) and prayed to Sri Nanjundeshwara Swamy. Shiva appeared and advised him to build a mantapa and perform pooja to the Shivlinga. While clearing the shrubs with his parashu (axe), Parashuram's axe unintentionally hit the Shivlinga, and the tip of the Shivlinga began to bleed. Sage Parashuram felt very guilty and said, "I have committed another unforgivable sin; only by killing myself shall I be relieved from all my sins", and prepared to kill himself. Shiva appeared and blessed Sage Parashuram and told him to apply wet mud upon the Shivlinga (the mud of Sri Nanjangud has immense healing powers). The Shivlinga stopped bleeding. Lord Shiva advised Parashuram to build the mantapa and continue his penance. Finally, Sage Parashuram was relieved from all his sins and blessed with immortality.

The Goddess Parvati, consort of Shiva, wanted to visit this holy place, and so he brought her to Garalapuri Nanjangud. When she went to the Kabini River and bent down to touch the water, a gemstone bead (mani) fell off from her crown into the water. Lord Shiva was pleased and declared, "Devi, until now, the place had my divine blessings and presence; from this moment, it shall have your presence, grace and blessings, too. It shall also be called Dakshina Manikarnika Ghat".

During the reign of Tipu Sultan, his royal elephant suffered from an eye affliction. On the advice of temple priests, Tipu arranged for the elephant to be bathed in the Kapila River and its eyes to be wiped with water used in the abhishekam (ritual bathing) of Lord Srikanteshwara for one mandala of 48 days. On the 48th day, the elephant's sight was restored. Tipu Sultan offered a jade (pachche) Shivlinga, also described as a Maragatha Lingam, as a token of gratitude to Sri Nanjundeshwara Swamy and called Lord Shiva "Hakim Nanjunda" (healer, from the Urdu for doctor). He also gifted a jade lingam adorned with a makara kanti haara (emerald necklace), which is displayed in the temple once a year during the Girijakalyana festival. Hyder Ali, Tipu's father, was similarly associated with the temple; according to the Mysore Gazetteer, a comparable account of the healing of his elephant's eye by the temple's holy water is also attributed to him. The origins of the Srikanteshwara Temple date back to the Ganga dynasty, but its expansion and present grandeur are attributed to contributions from the Cholas, Hoysalas, and the Wodeyars of Mysore. The prakara (outer courtyard wall) contains multiple niches housing 122 images of Shiva in various forms, as well as sculptures of Ganpati, Saptamatrika, and other deities. The temple also houses a stone sculpture of Krishnaraja Wadiyar III and his four wives, along with 65 Shiva lingas of various sizes and multiple vahanas (processional carriages). The Garba Griha (inner sanctum) was constructed during the Chola period, around the 11th century AD. The anterior mandapa, where devotees sit, was added during the Hoysala period around the 13th century AD. During the Vijayanagara period, a brick-and-mortar shikhara was built over the shrine, and the Parvati and Narayana shrines were added. While the Gangas first established a smaller shrine, the Cholas and Hoysalas made significant architectural additions. The Wodeyars, prominent patrons of the temple, are credited with building the impressive gopuram and several mandapas.

The name "Nanjundeshwara", meaning "the healer", is derived from Lord Shiva's act of consuming poison (Halahala) during the Samudra Manthana (churning of the ocean).

== Gallery ==
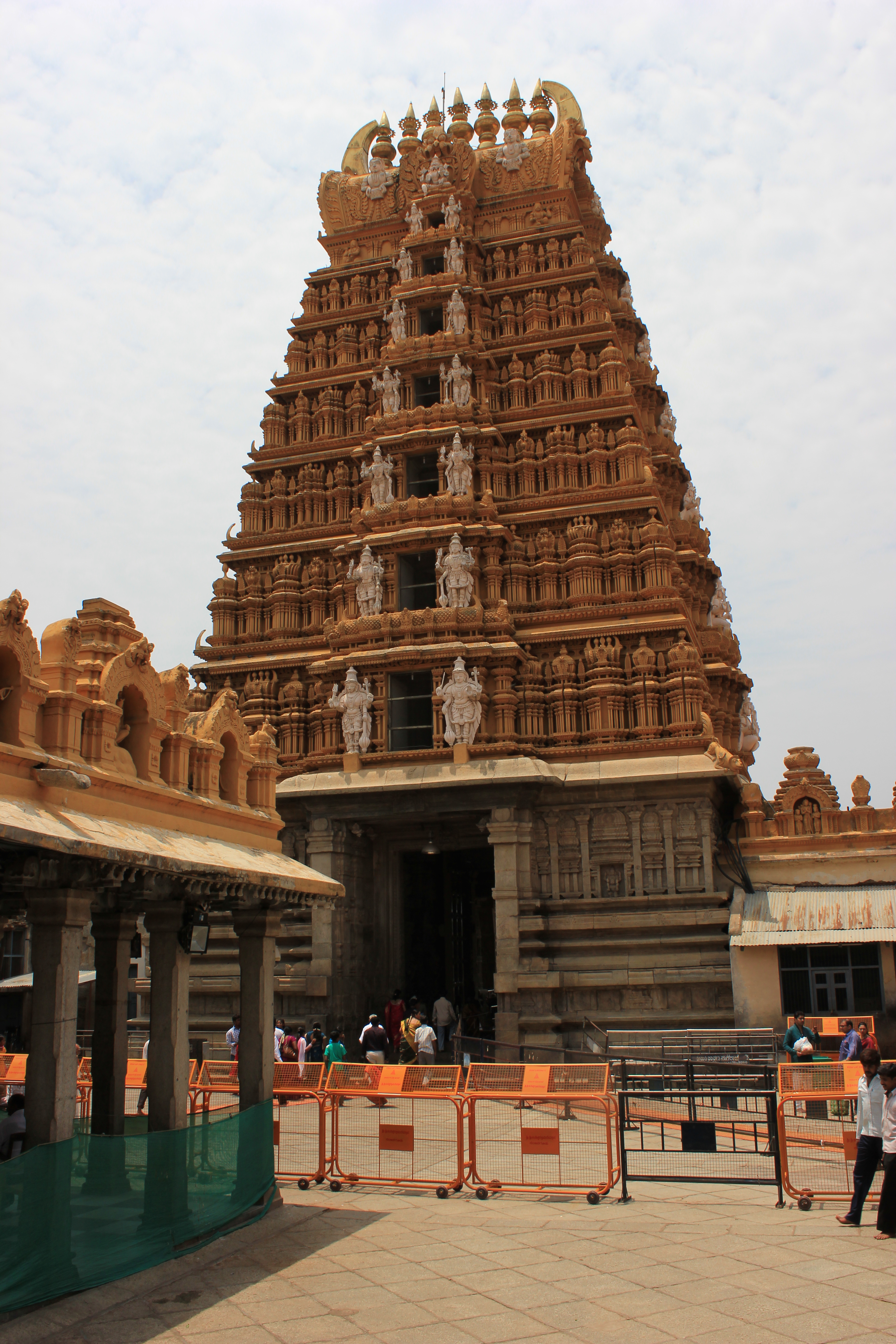
View of gopura from inside

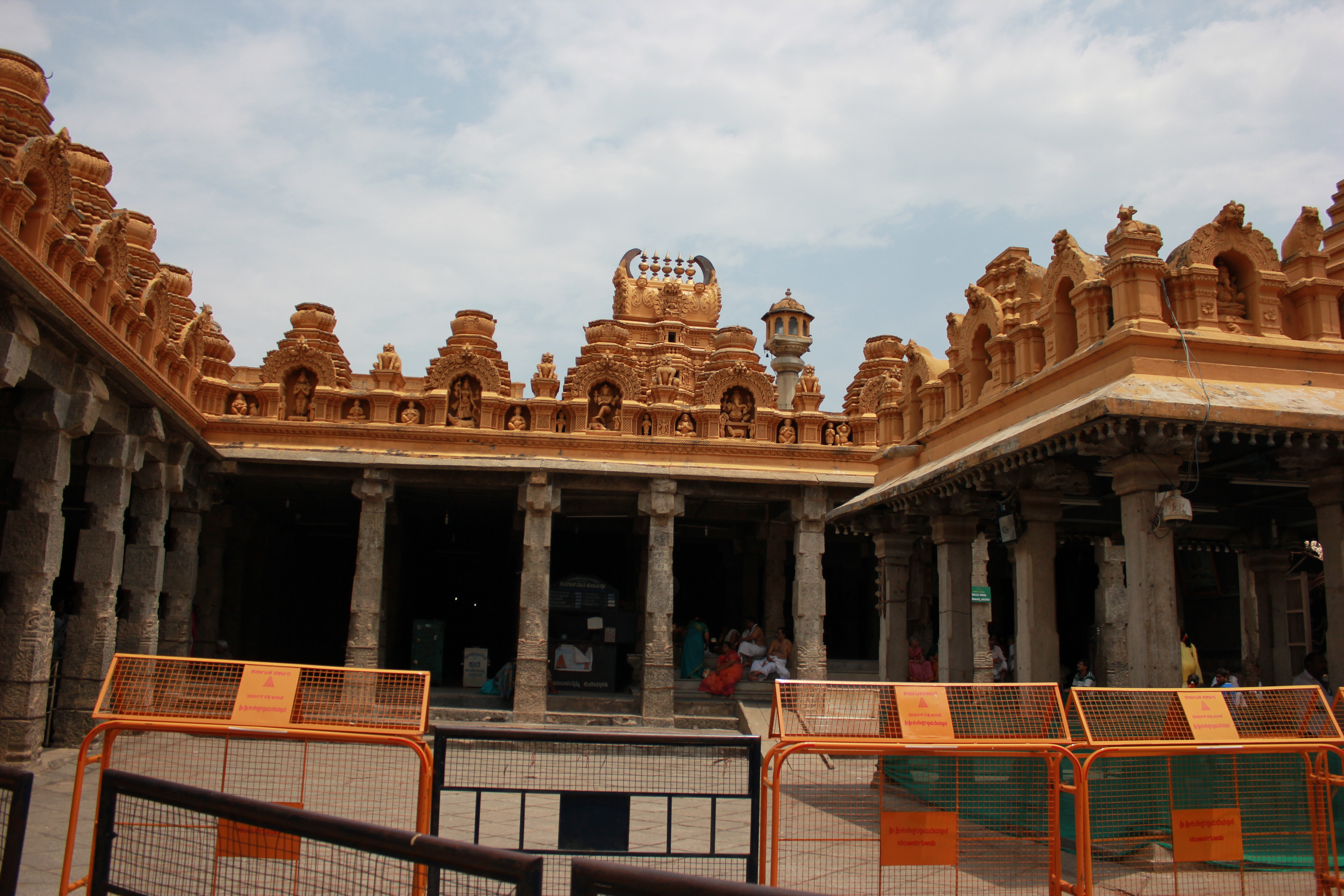
Large pillared mantapa with sala towers

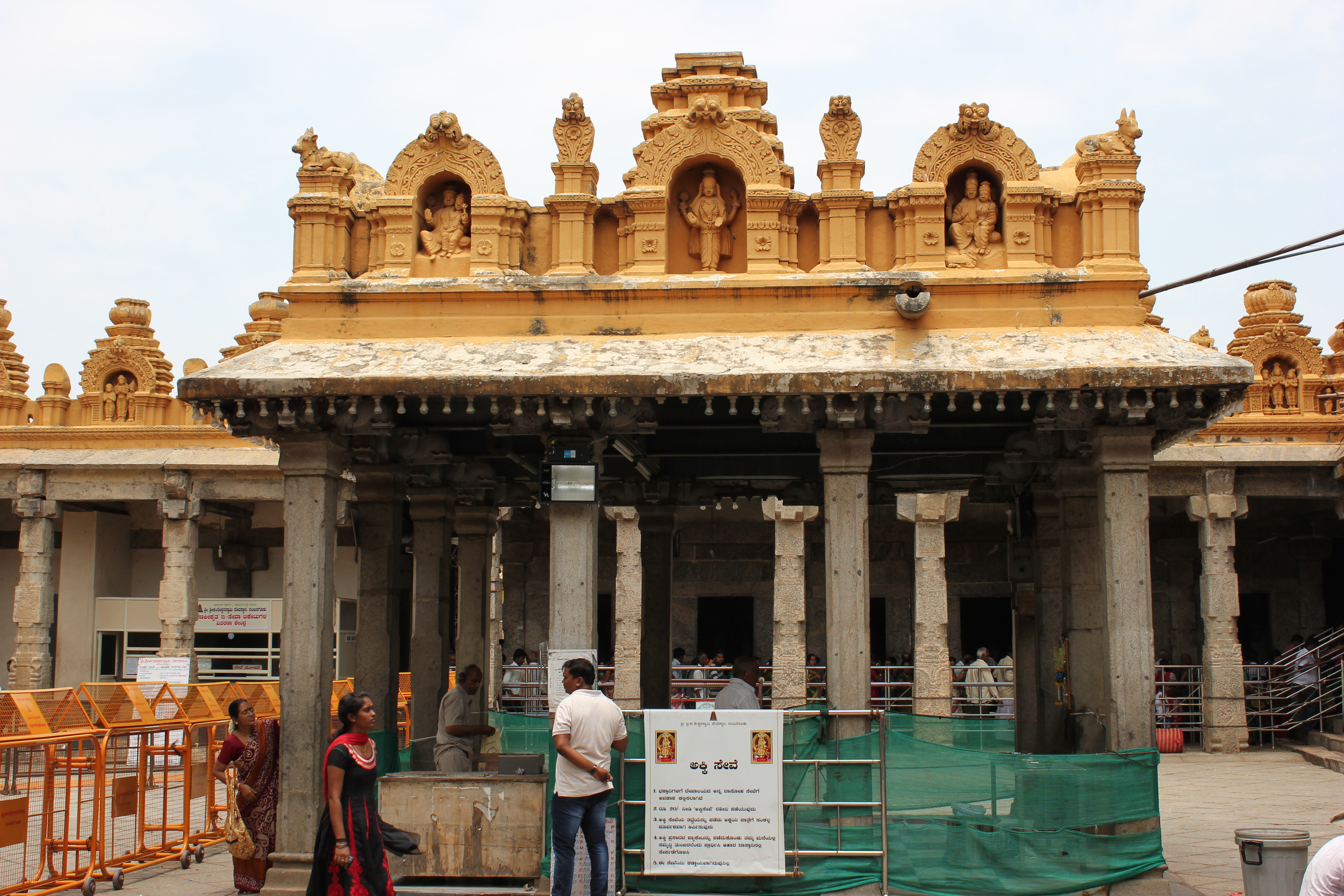
Open mantapa with sala roofs

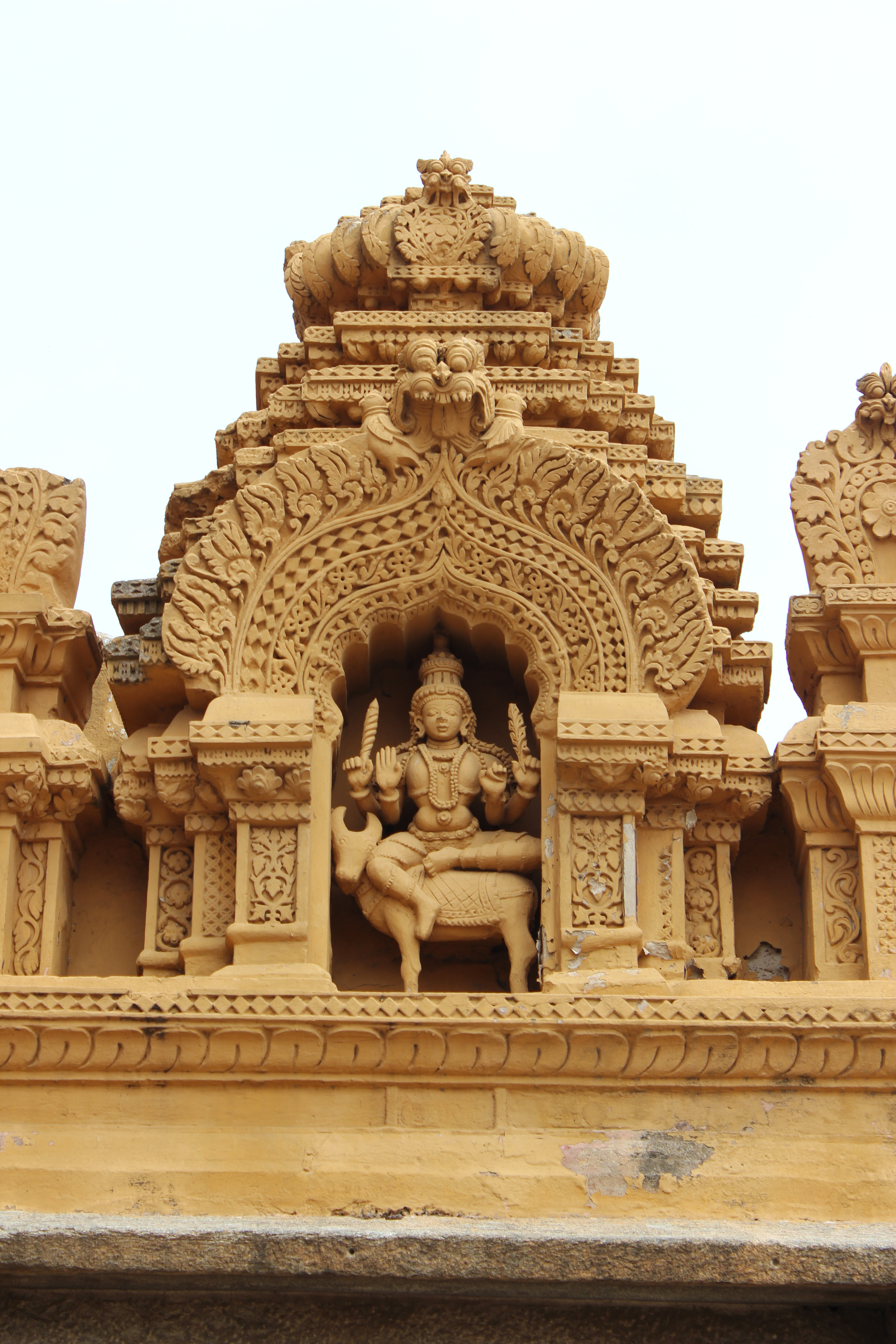
Close up view of sala tower over mantapa

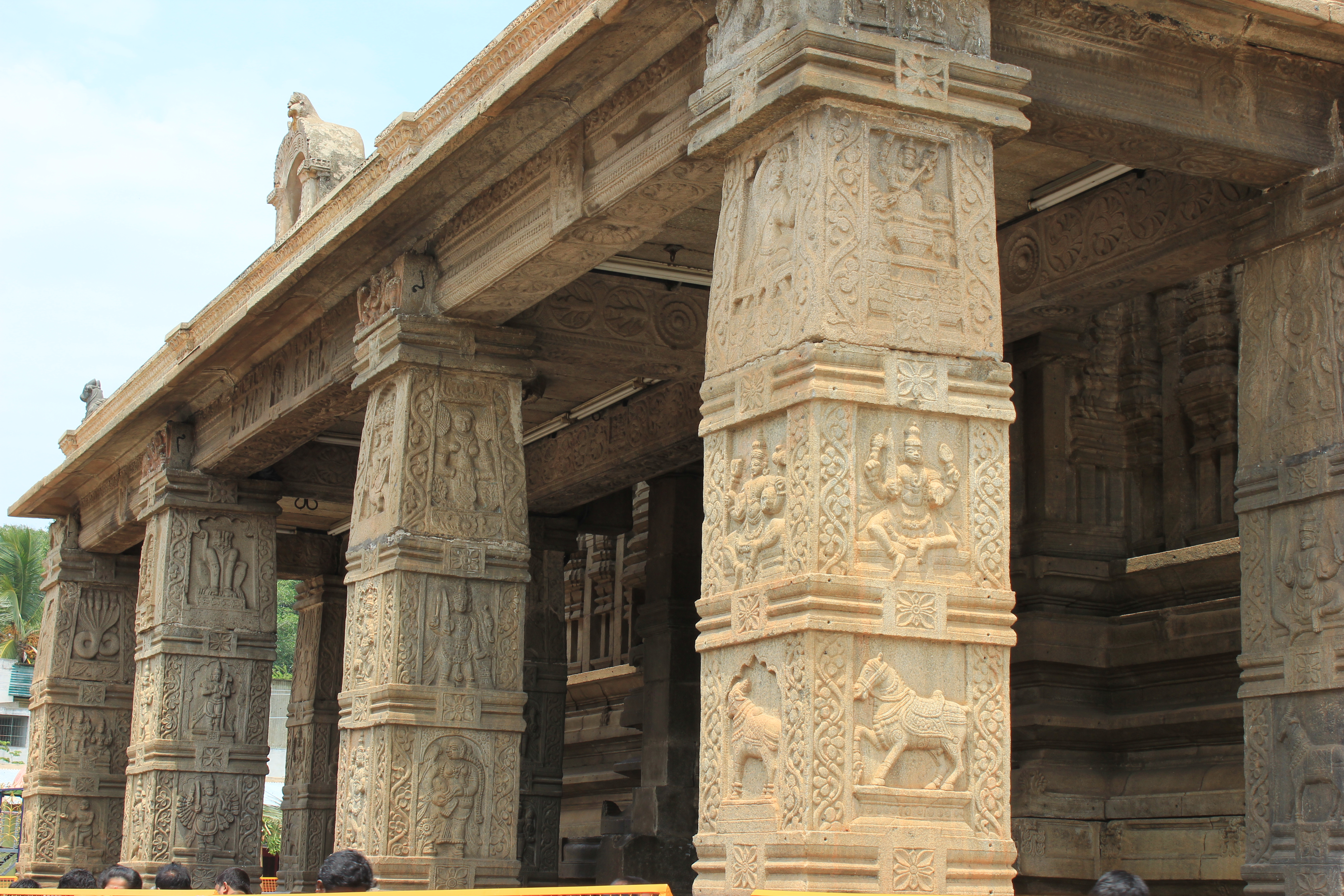
Pillared entrance to temple

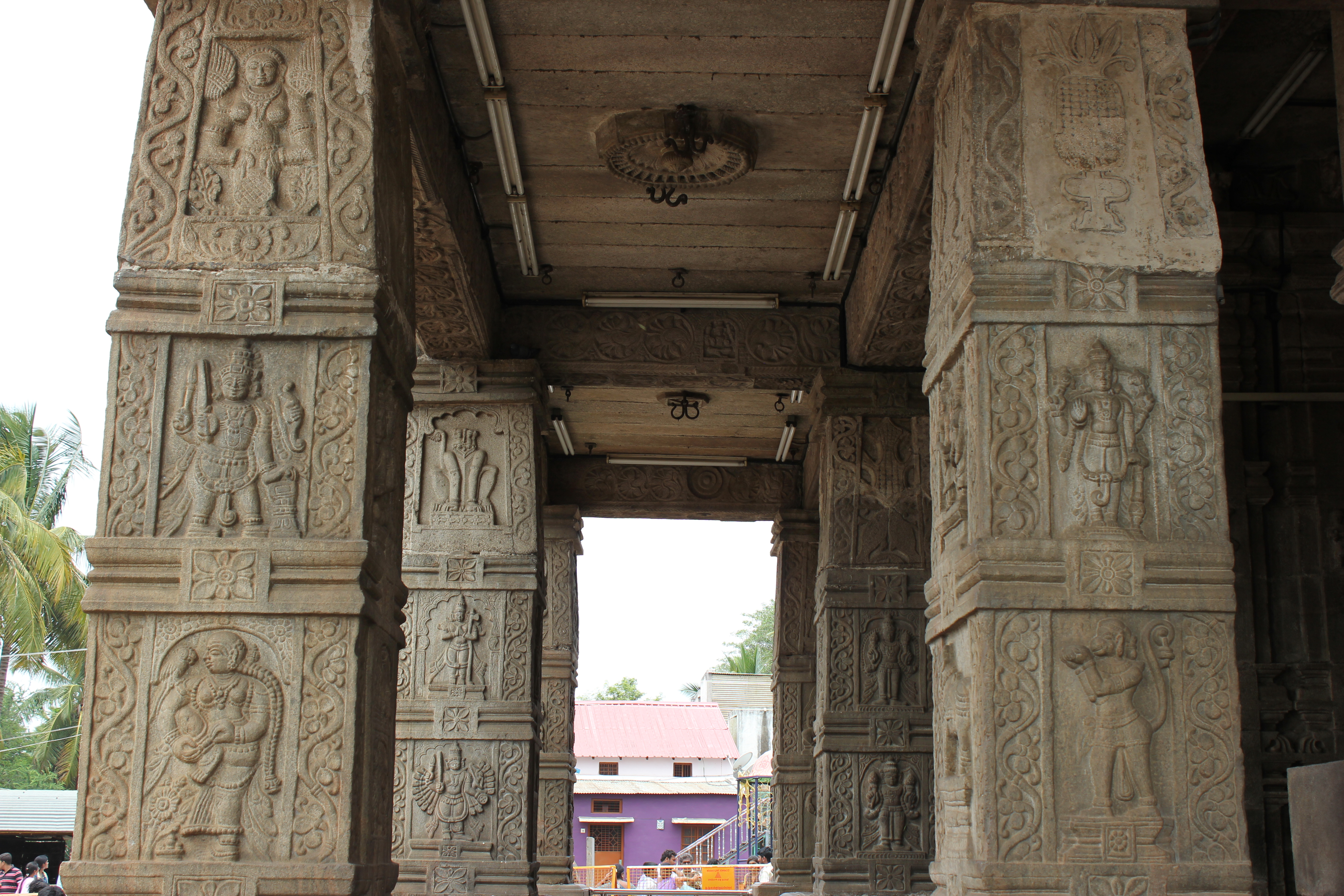
Close up view of pillared entrance to temple

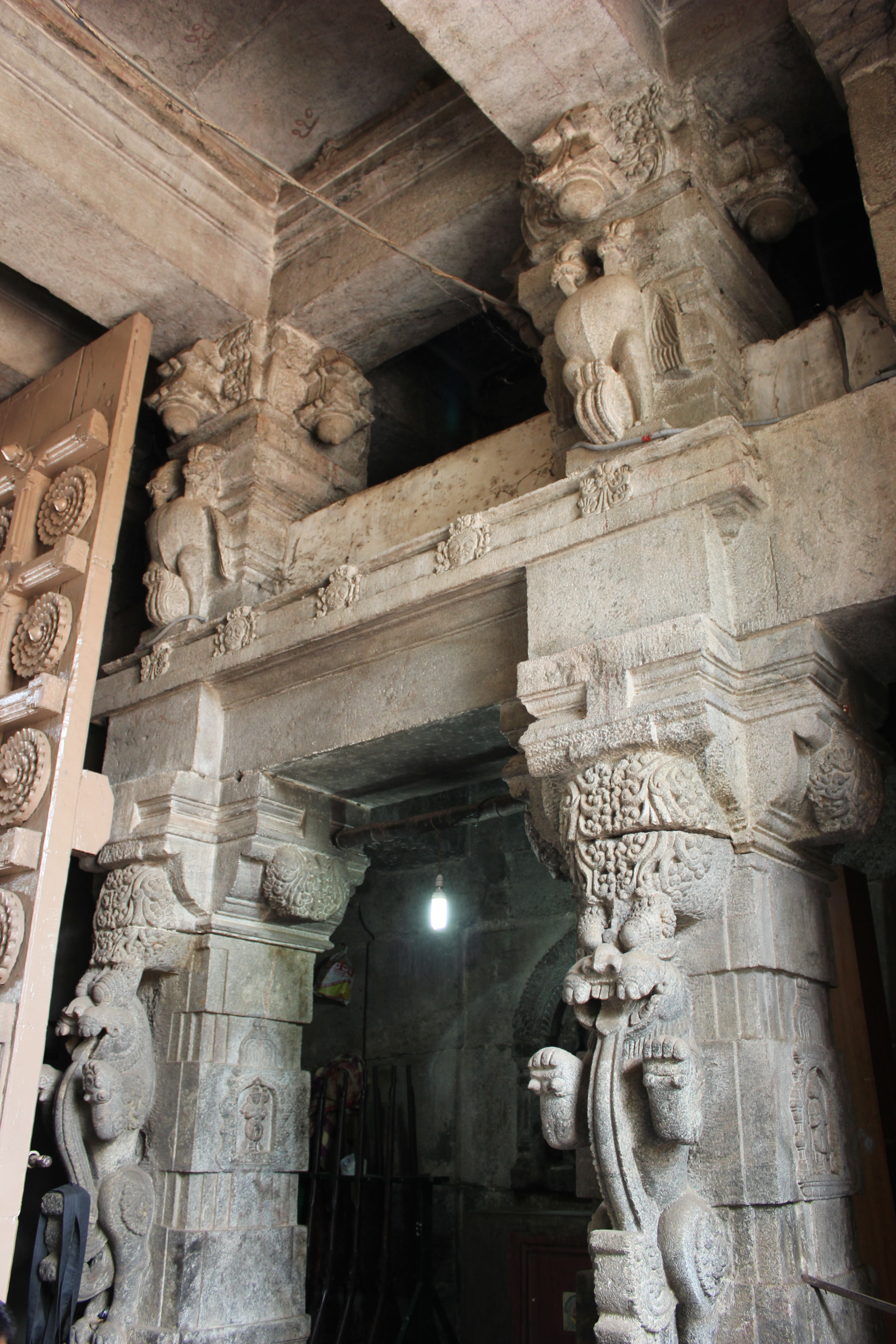
Yali pillars in the mahadwara

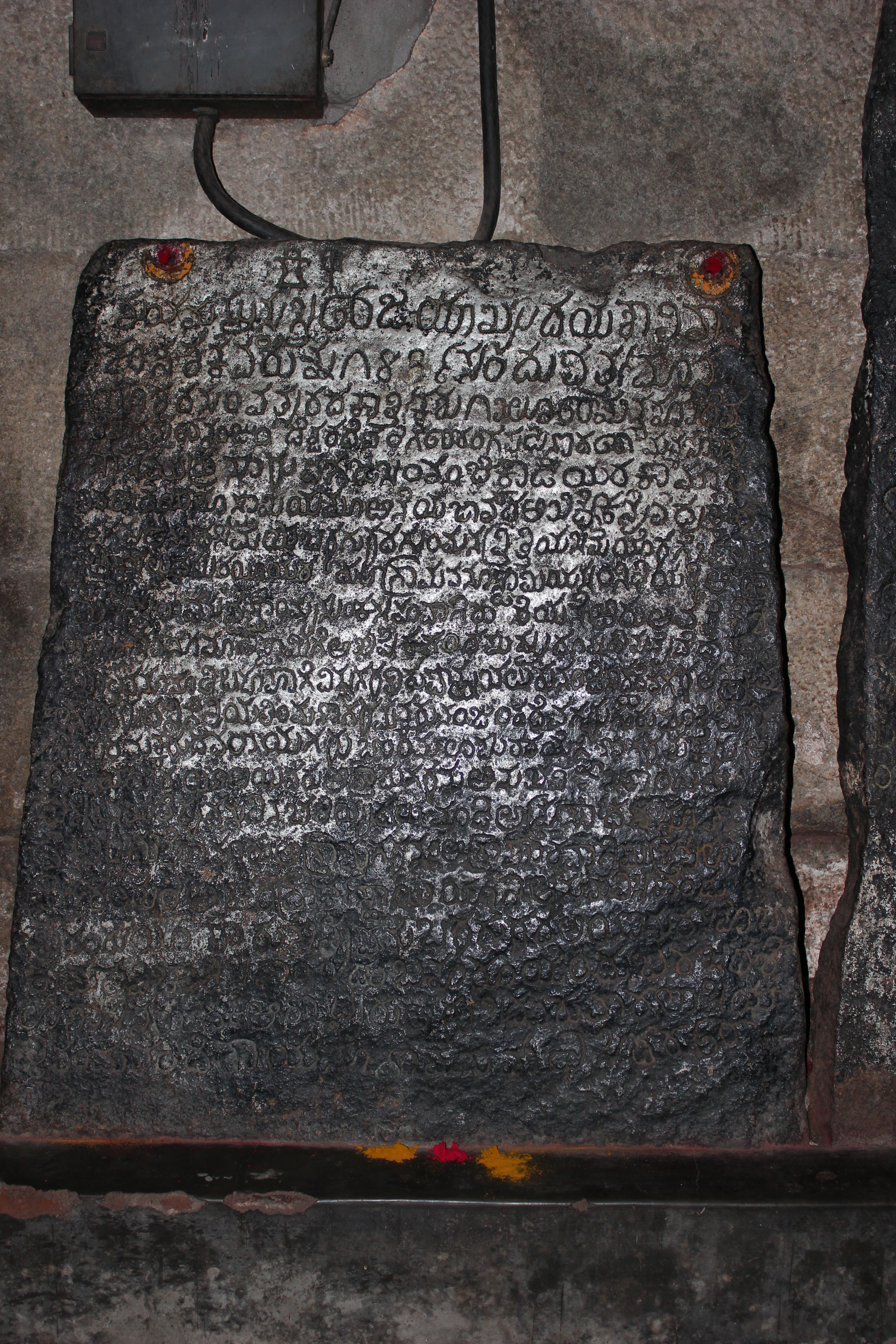
Kannada inscription (1517 CE) of King Krishnadevaraya's father-in-law

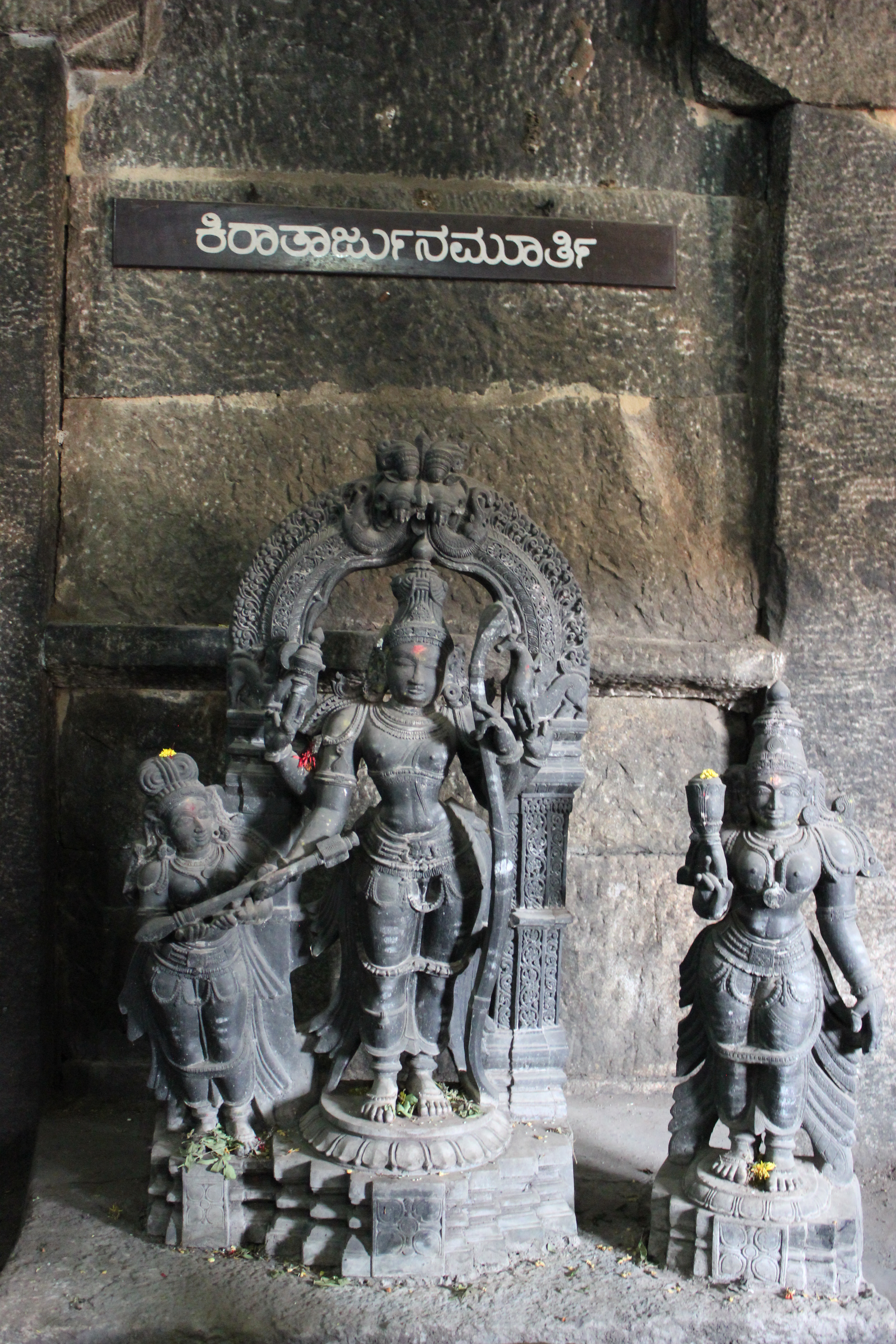
Deity sculpture

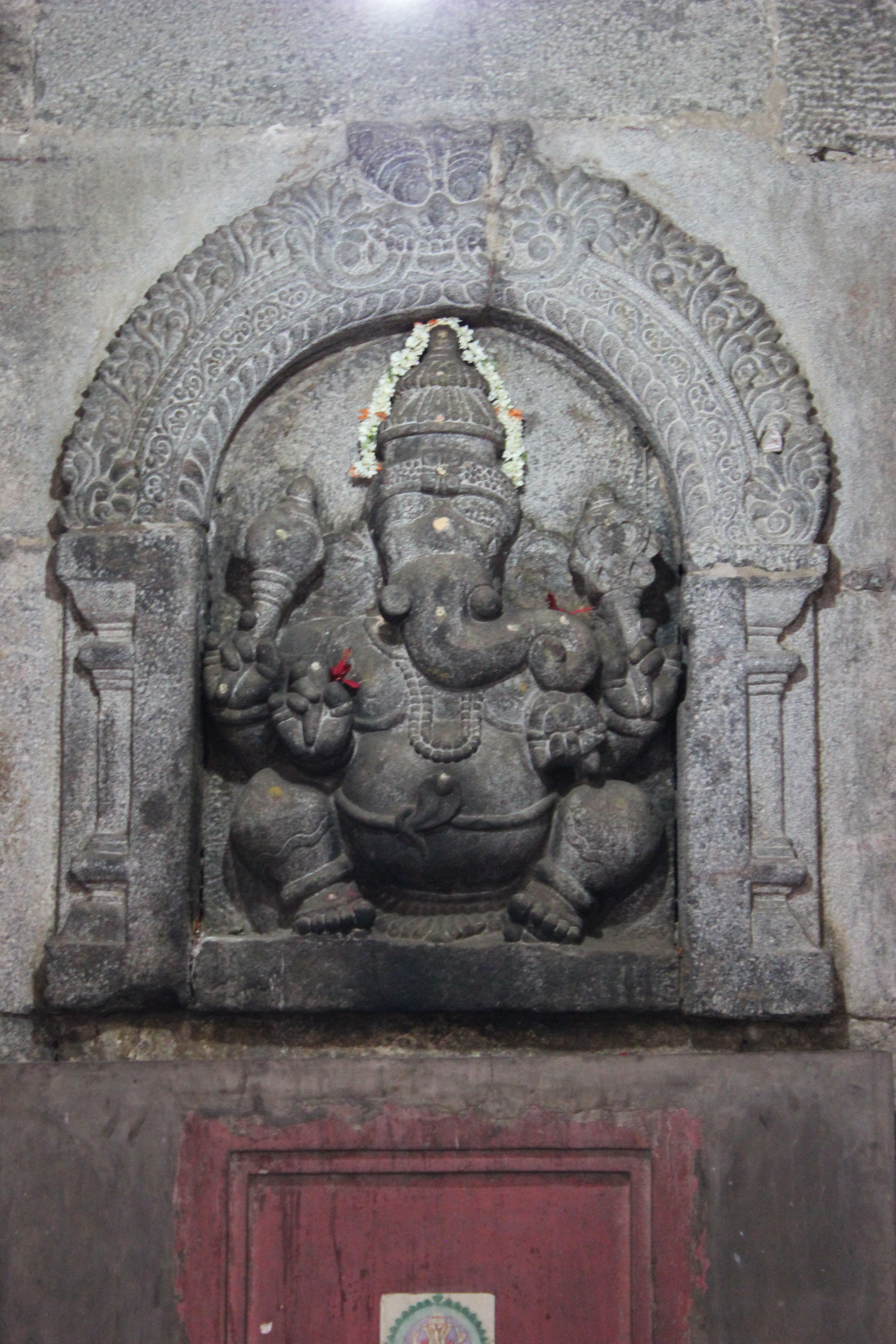
Ganesha sculpture

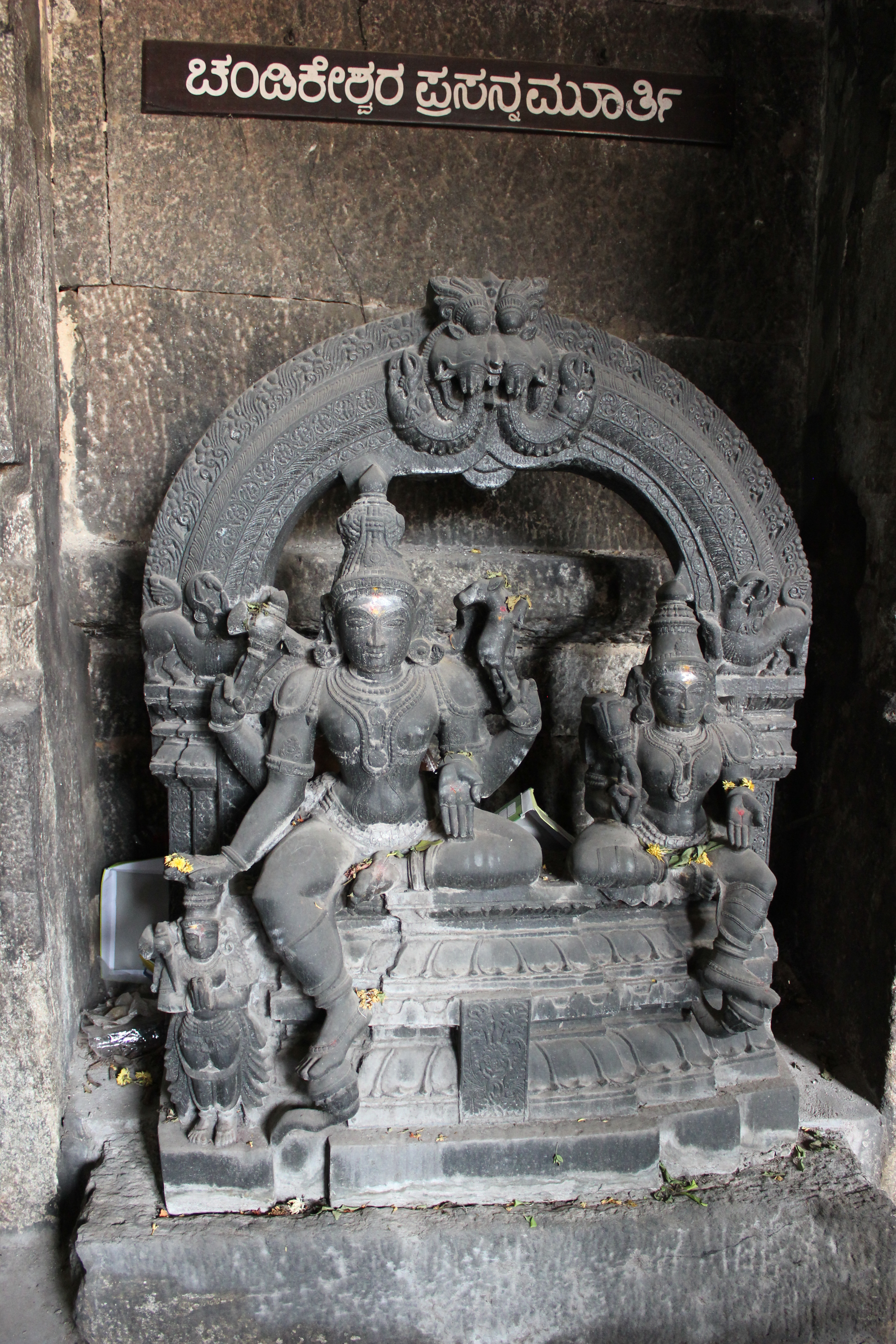
Deity sculpture

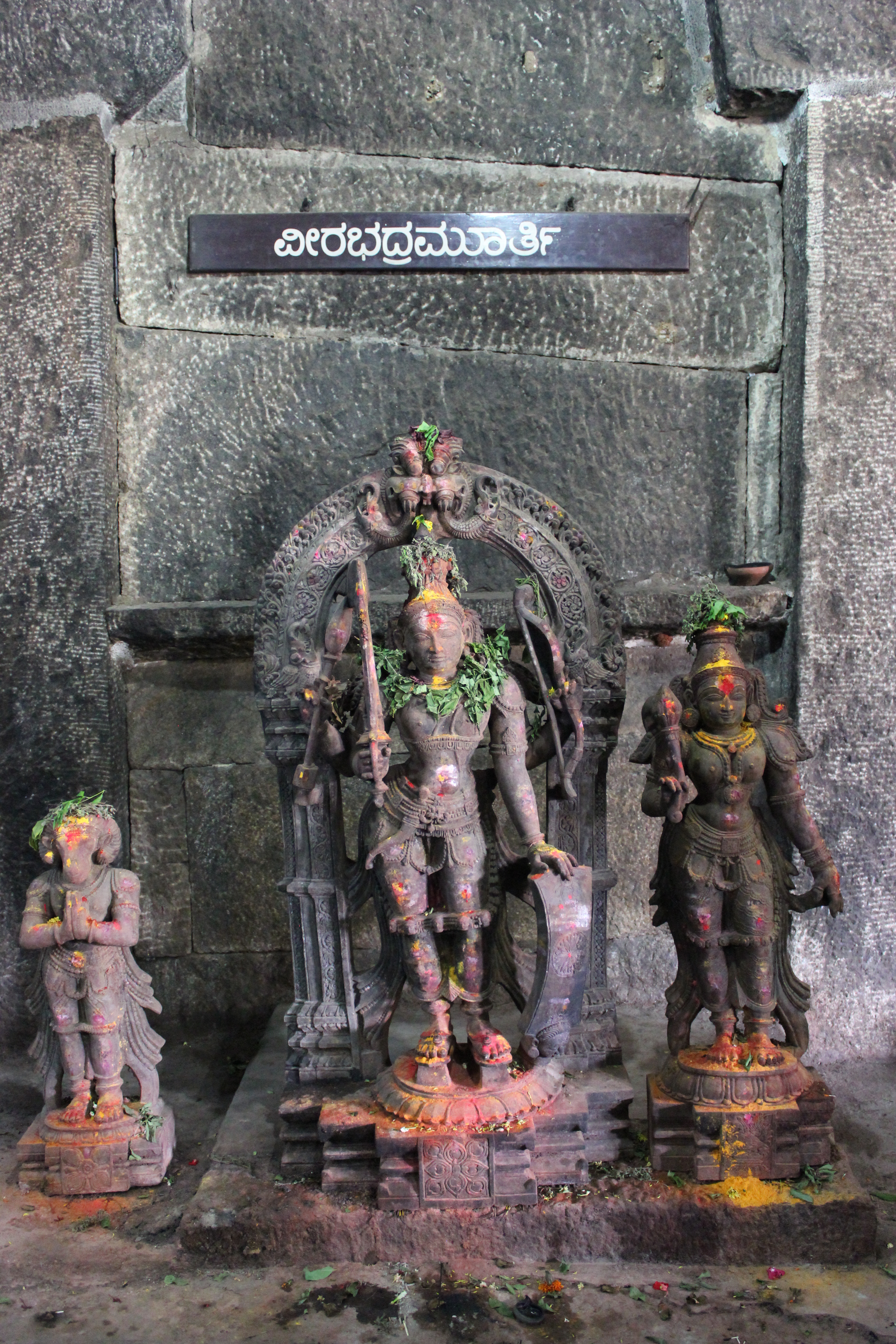
Shree Veerabhadreshwara sculpture

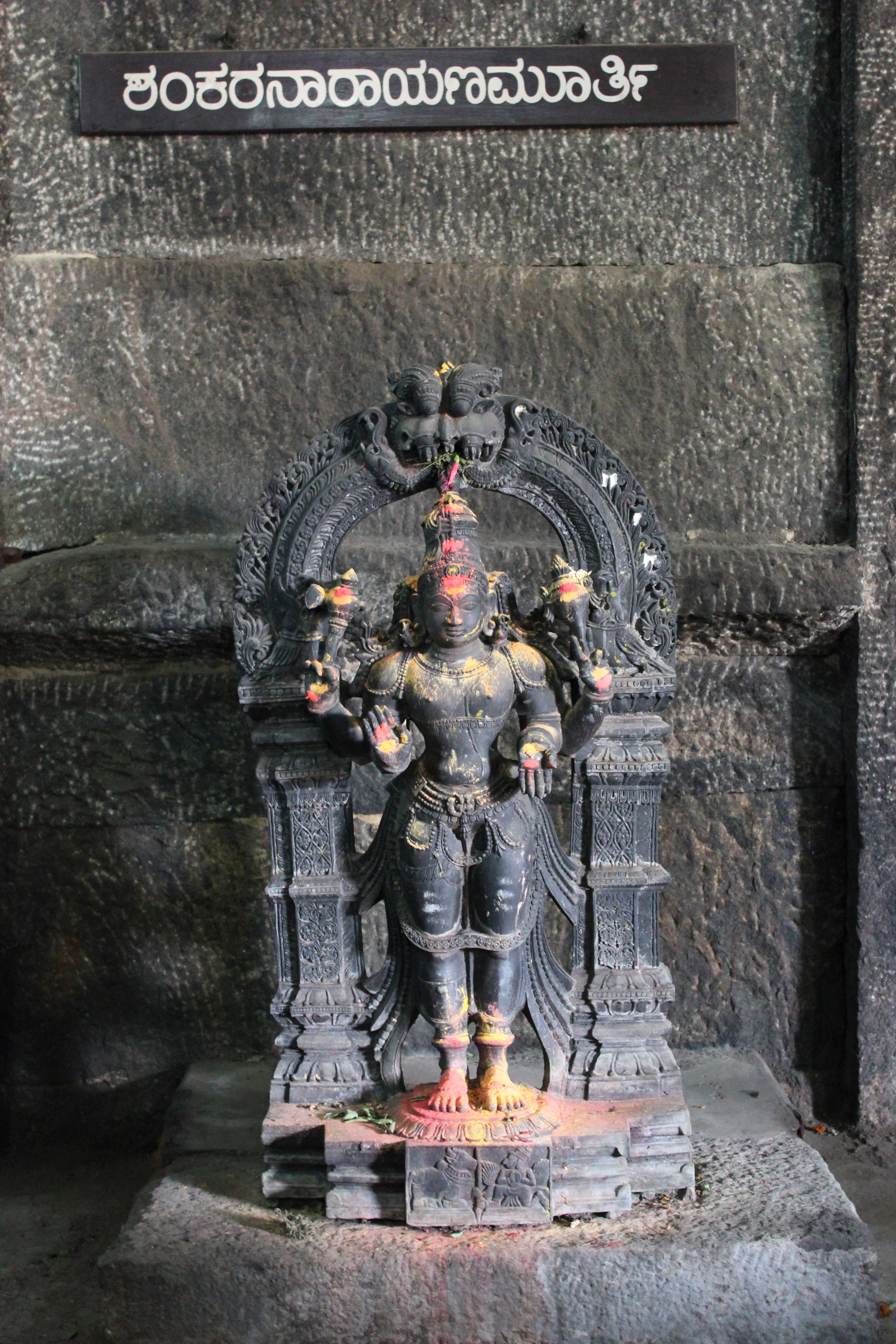
Deity sculpture

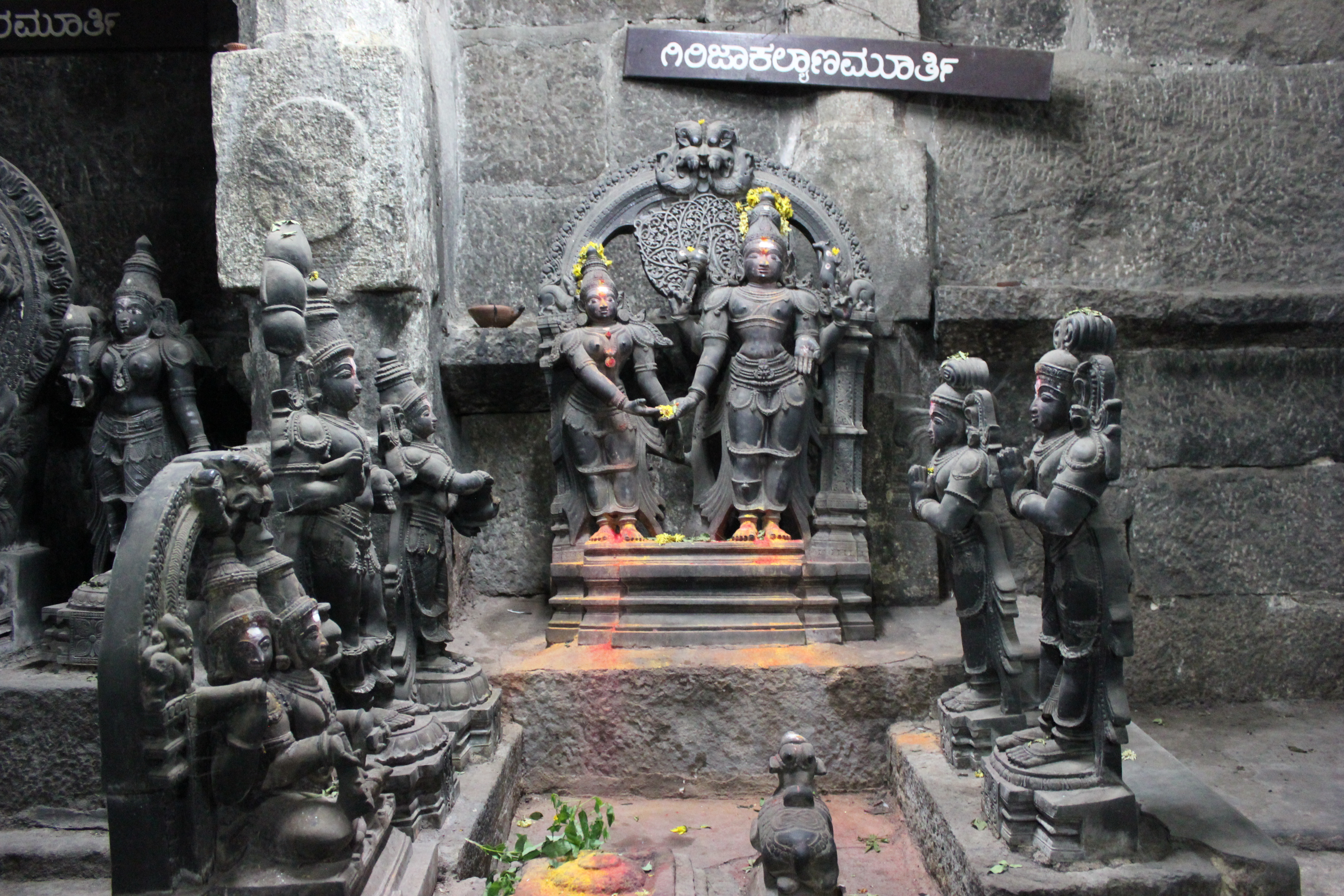
Deity sculpture

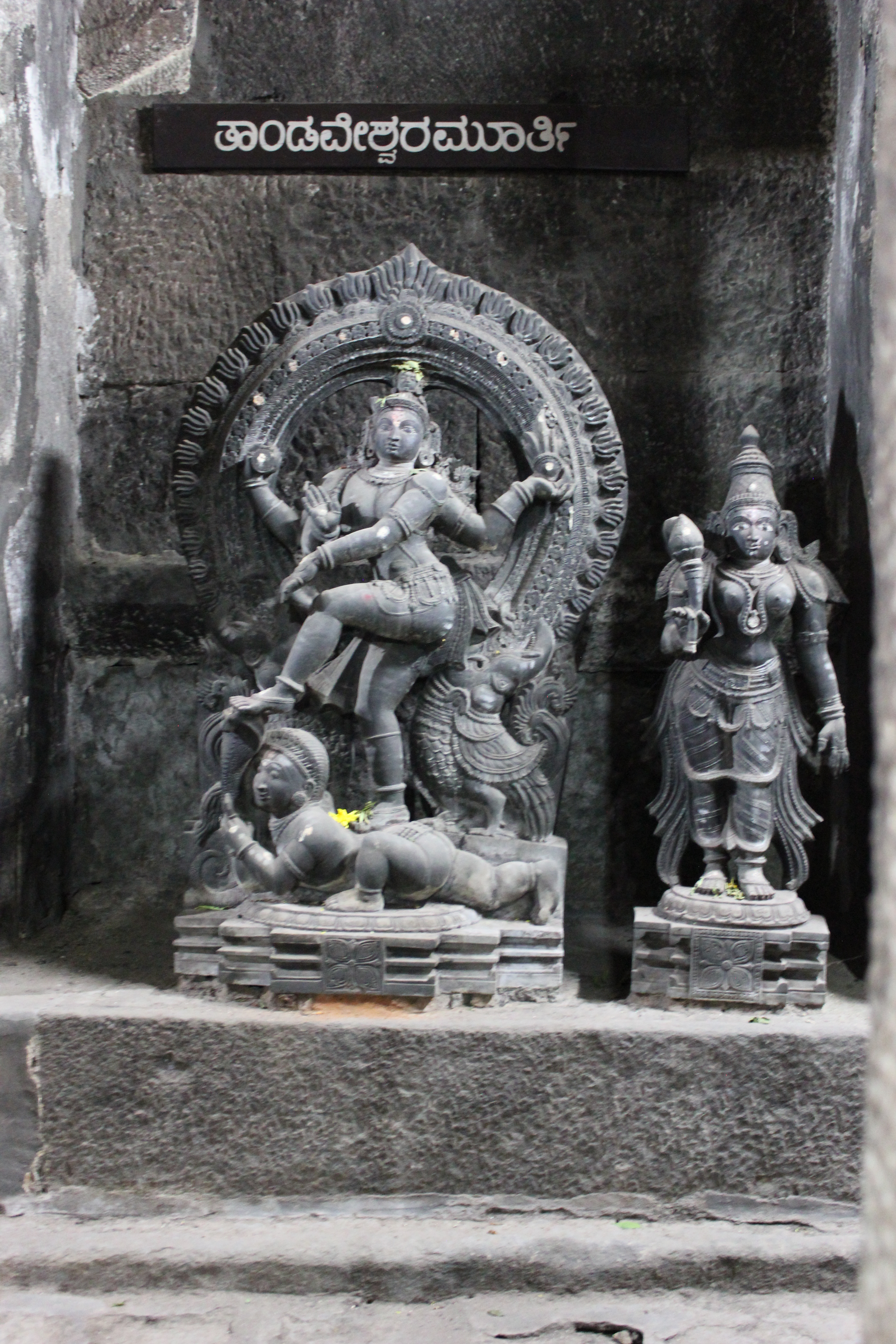
Deity sculpture

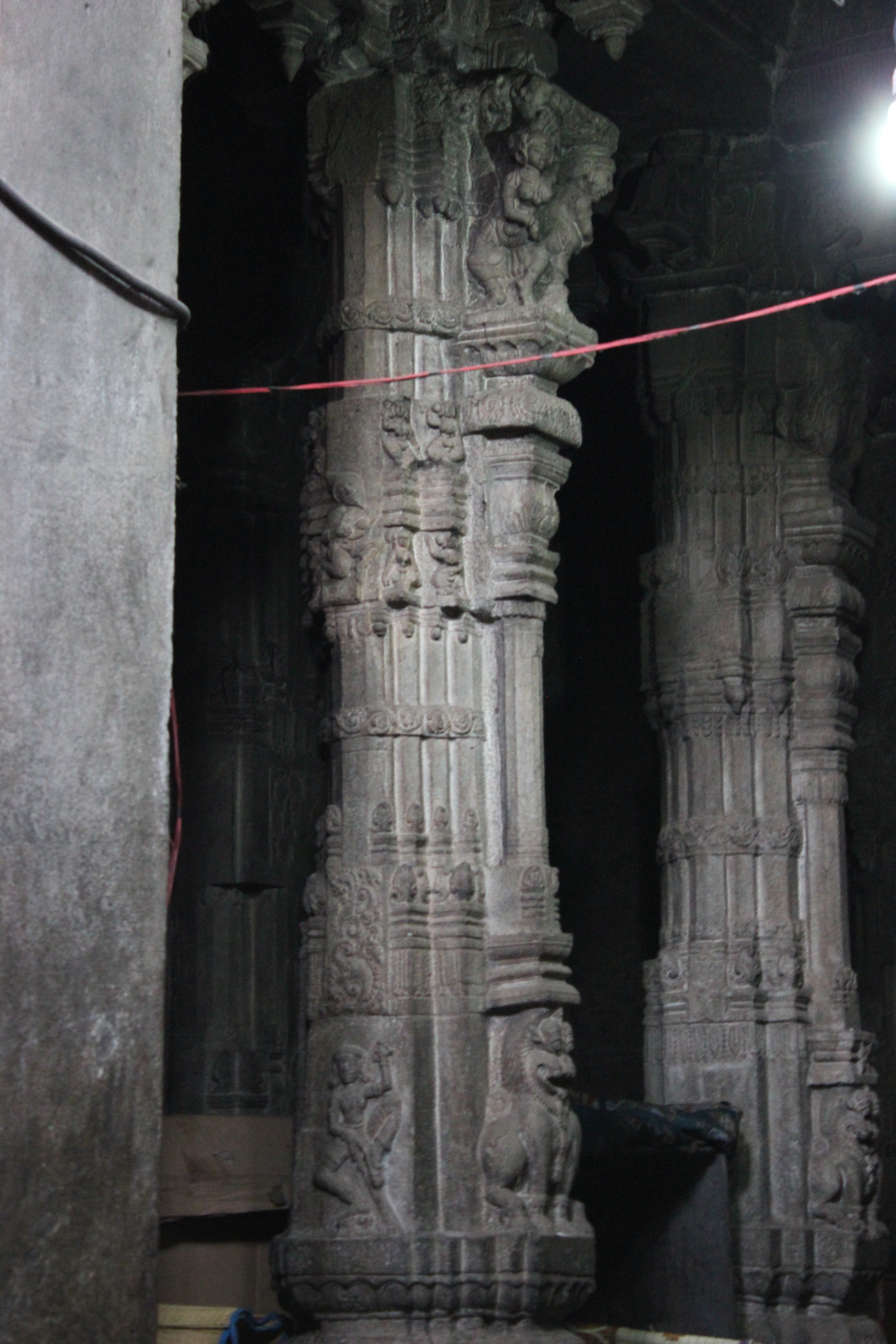
Decorative pillars

== See also ==
- Samudra manthan
