= Nanjangud =

Nanjangud Nanjanagoodu
- town
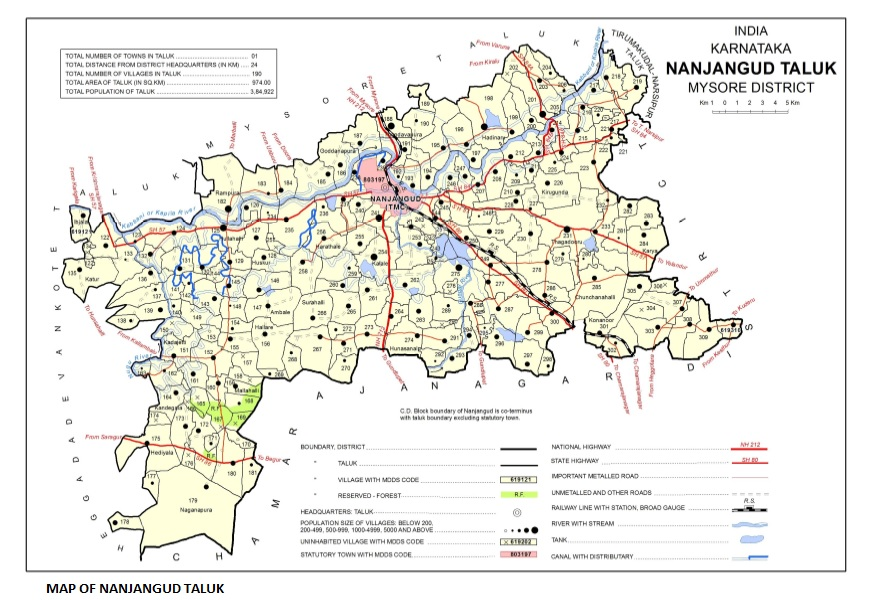
- Nanjangud Taluk Map
- Nicknames: Paddy Land, Dakshina Kaashi
- Interactive map of Nanjangud
- Coordinates: 12.12°N 76.68°E
- Country: India
- State: Karnataka
- District: Mysore
- Elevation: 656 m (2,152 ft)

Population (2011)
  - Total: 61,961
- Time zone: UTC+5:30 (IST)
- PIN: 571 301
- Telephone code: 08221
- Vehicle registration: KA-09
- Website: www.nanjanagudutown.gov.in; http://www.nanjanaguducity.mrc.gov.in

Nanjangud, officially known as Nanjanagudu, is a town and taluka in the Indian state of Karnataka. It lies on the banks of the river Kabini, 23 km (14 mi) from the city of Mysore. Nanjangud is famous for its Srikanteshwara Temple (also known as the Nanjundeshwara Temple). Nanjangud is also called the Varanasi of the South or Dakshina Kashi (southern Kashi). This town is also famous for a type of banana grown in the region called the Nanjangud banana or Nanjanagudu rasabale. Nanjangud's local administrative unit was designated as a municipal committee in 2015, including the villages of Devirammanahalli and Kallahalli.

== History ==
Nanjangud has been a major Shaiva centre for nearly a thousand years. Western Ganga dynasty kings in the 9th–10th centuries are considered to have built this temple, with significant additions by the Hoysalas, Cholas, and the Vijayanagara kings.

== Geography ==
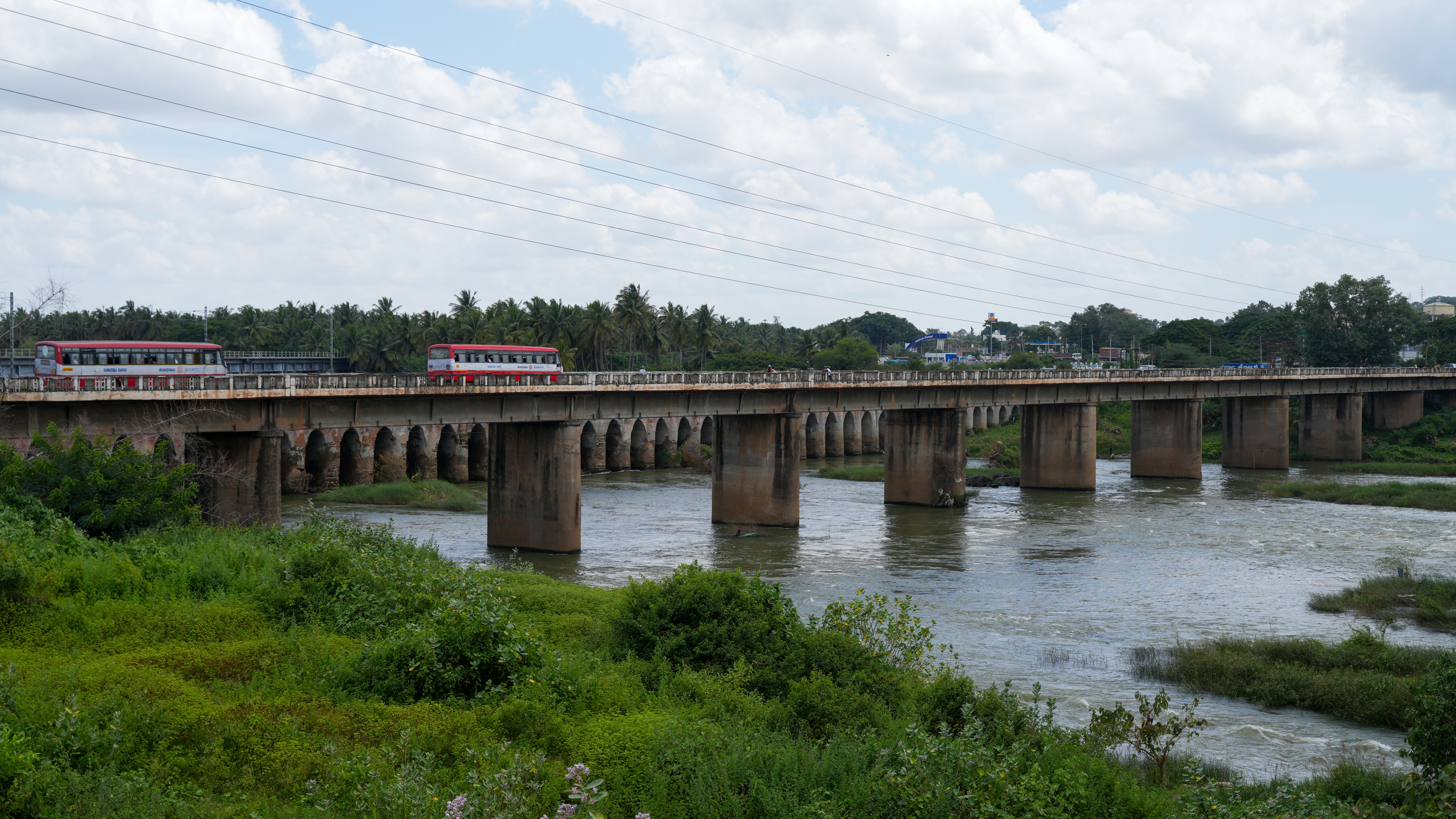
New road bridge across the river Kabini, Nanjangud

Nanjangud is located at 15.12°N 76.68°E. It has an average elevation of 657 metres (2155 ft). The taluk borders Mysore taluk of Mysore district to the north, T Narsipur taluk of Mysore district to the east, H D Kote taluk of Mysore district to the west and Gundlupet and Chamarajanagar taluks of Chamarajanagar district to the south.

== Nanjanagudu banana ==
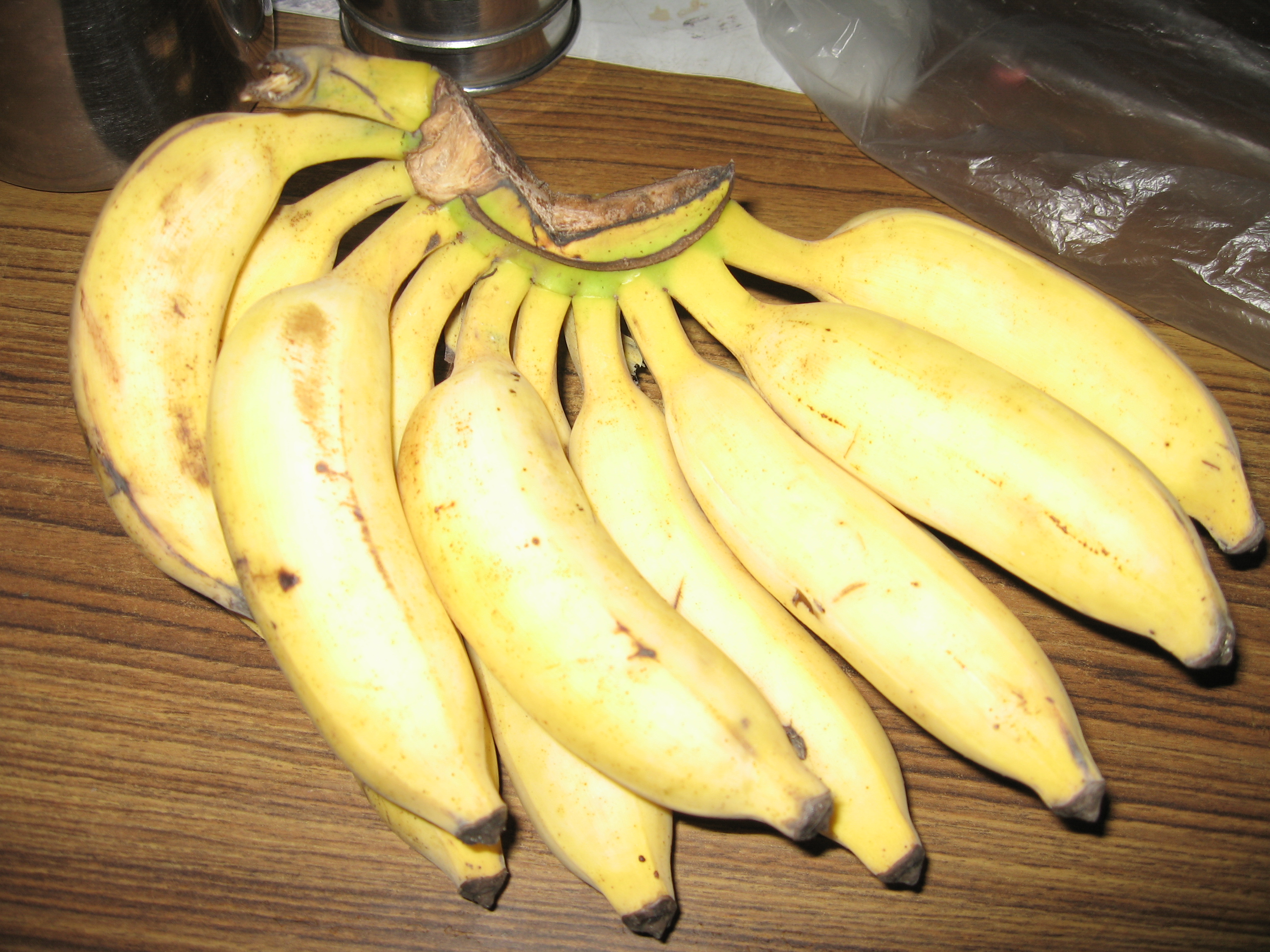
Nanjangudu Rasabaale

Nanjangud rasabaale is a popular variety of banana originating from the village of Devarasanahalli. The Nanjangud banana has been given geographical indication tag number 29. Kayyar Kinhanna Rai authored a Kannada poem on the banana titled "Hannu Maruvavana Haadu".

== Image gallery ==
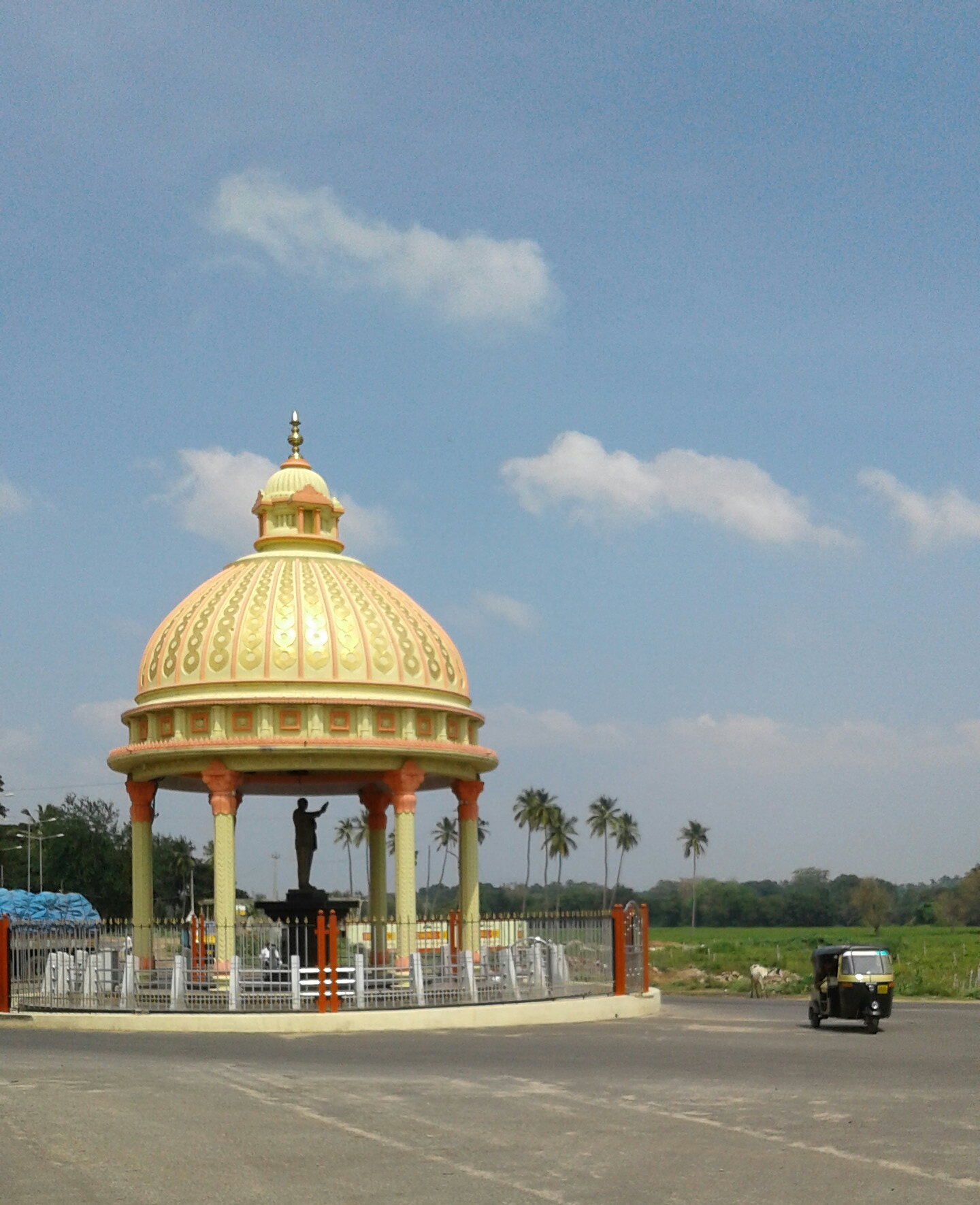
Ambedkar Circle

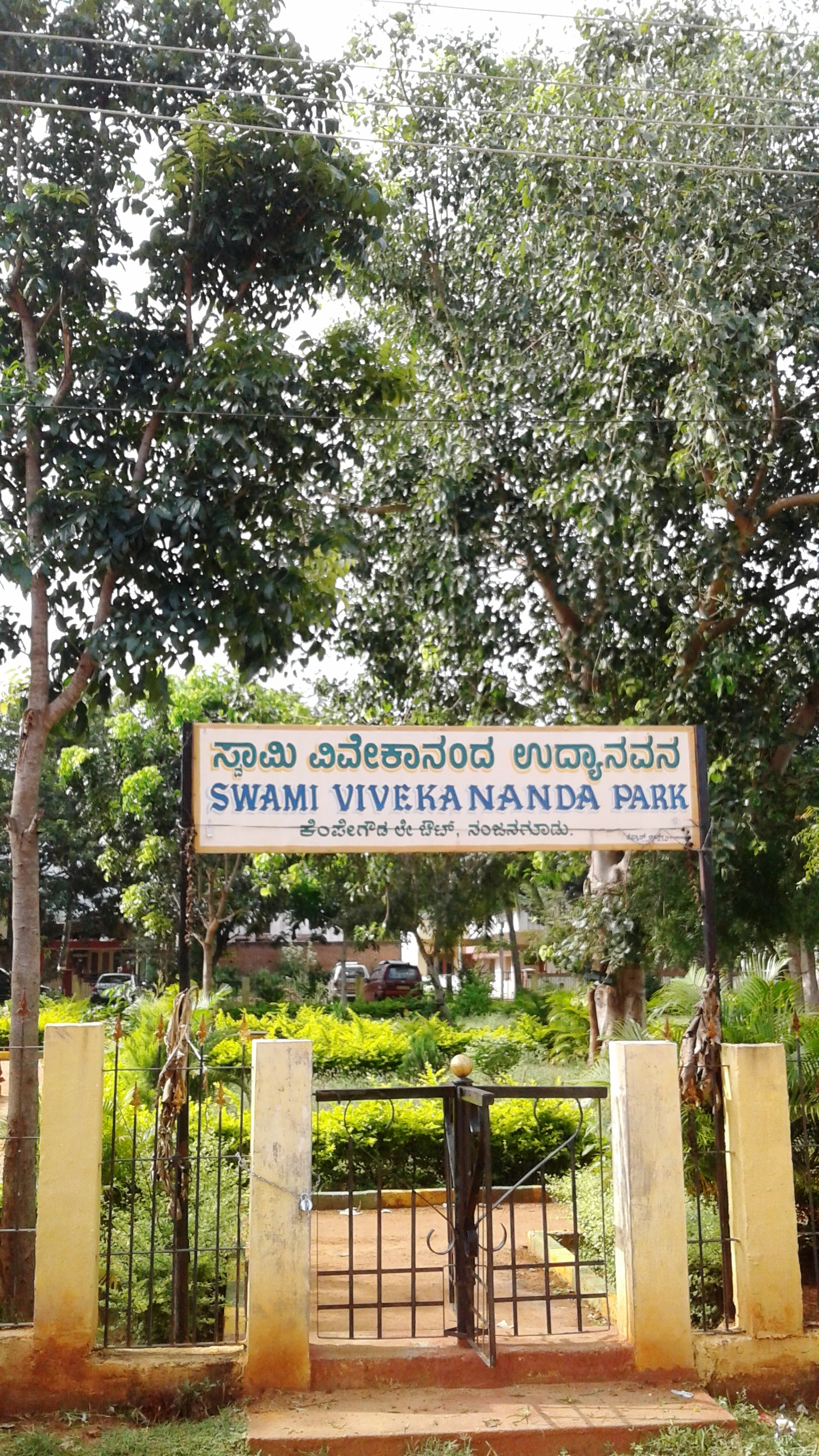
Vivekananda Park

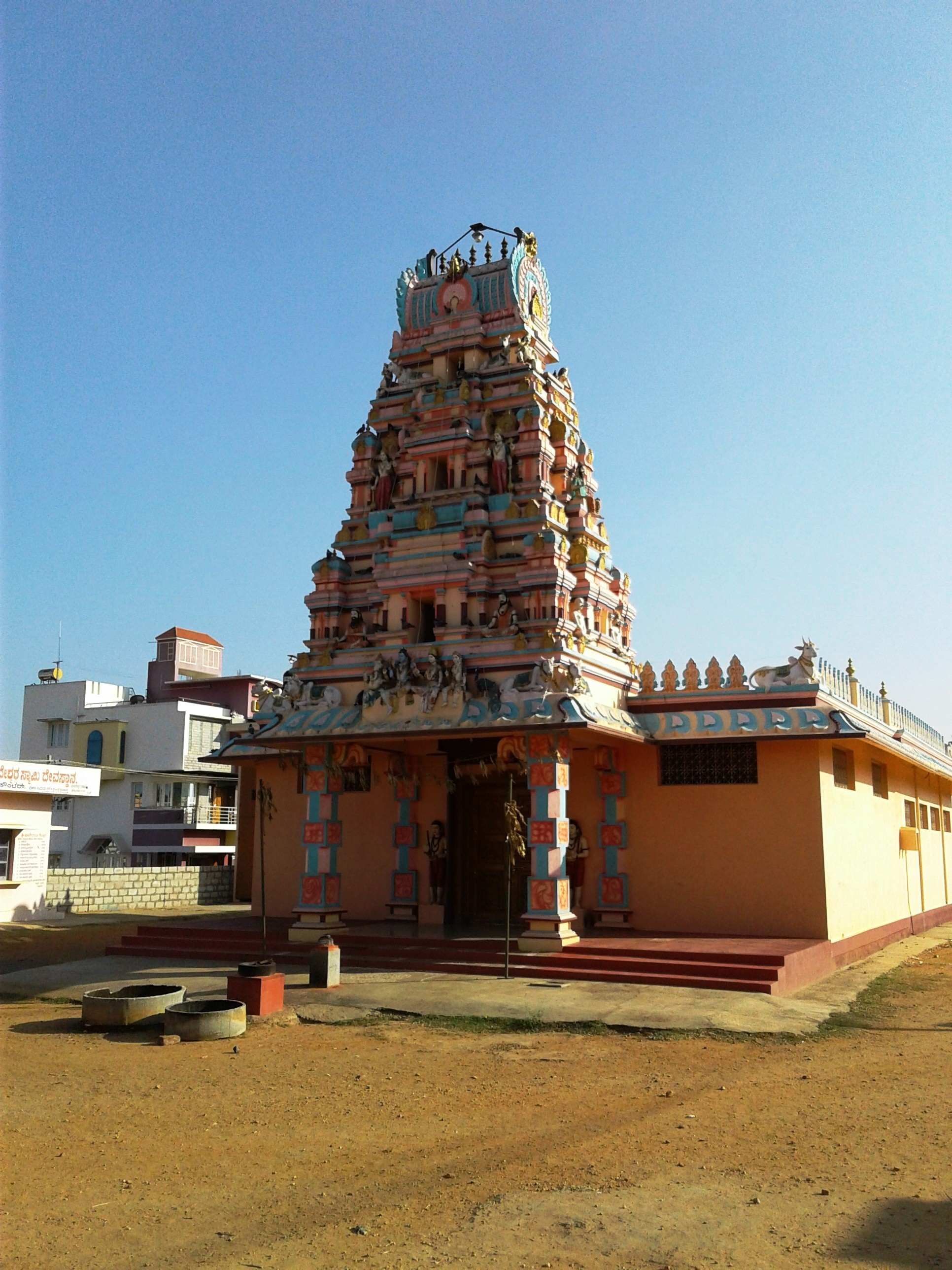
Mahadeshara Temple

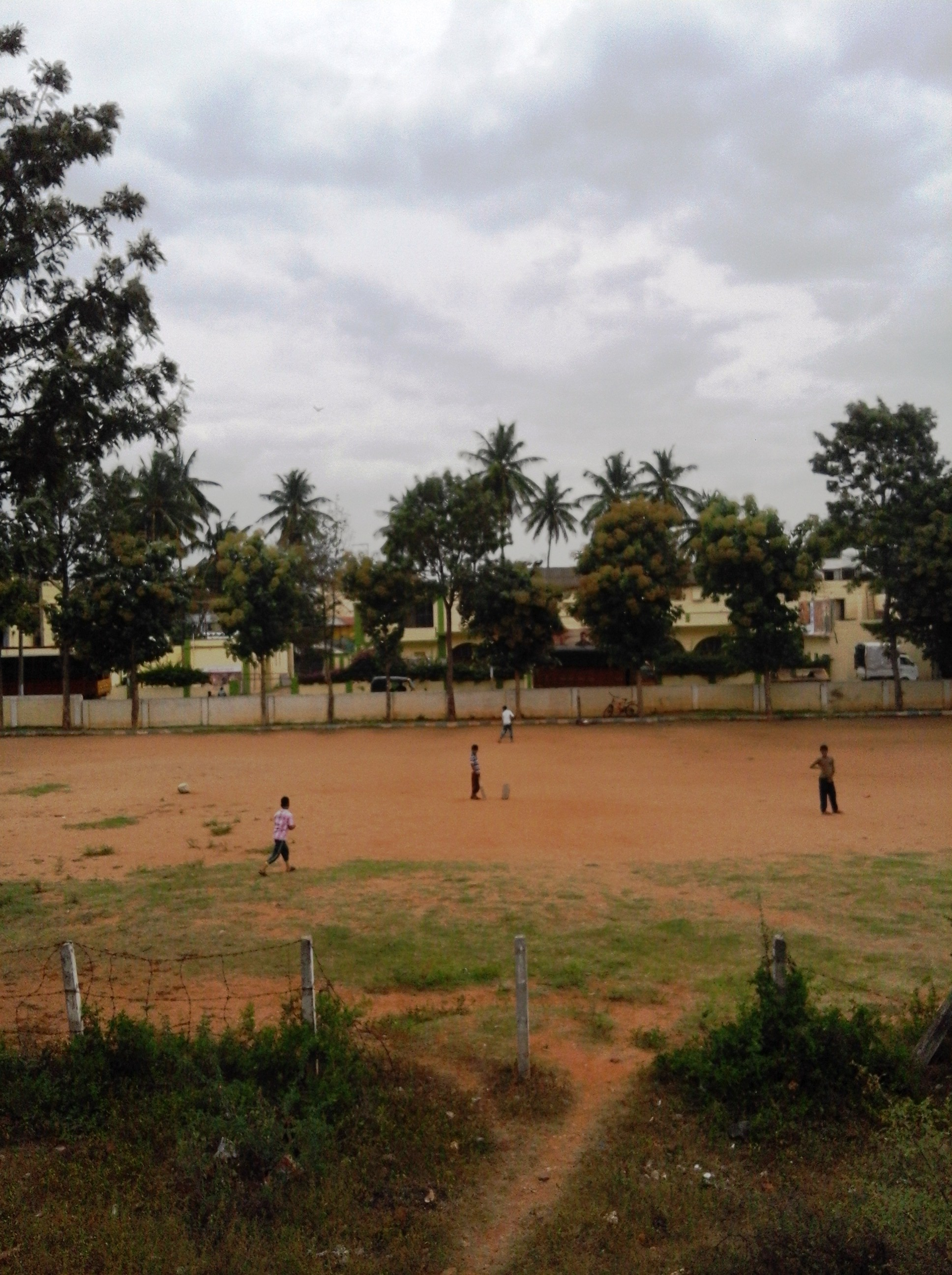
Nanjangud Ground

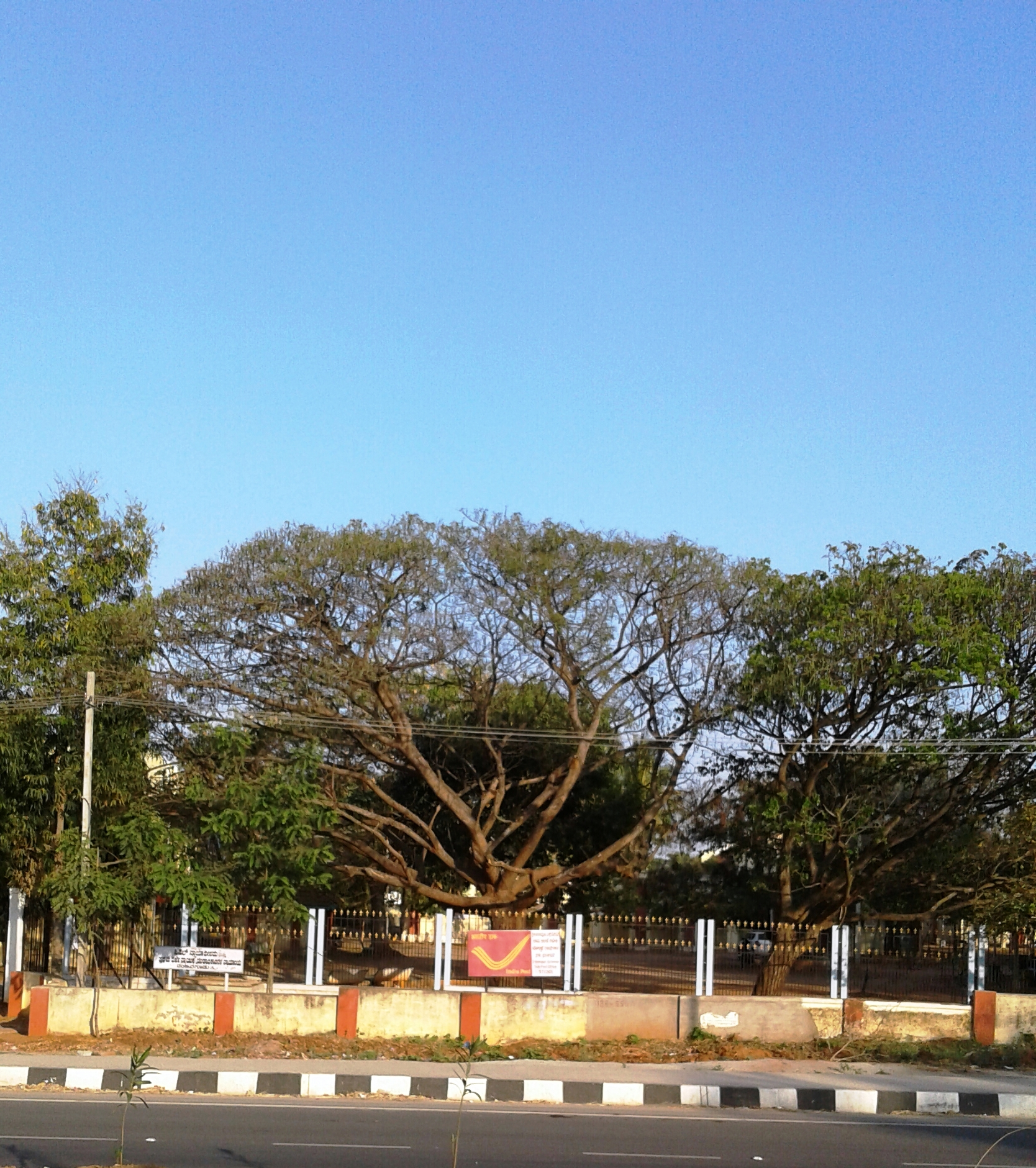
Court

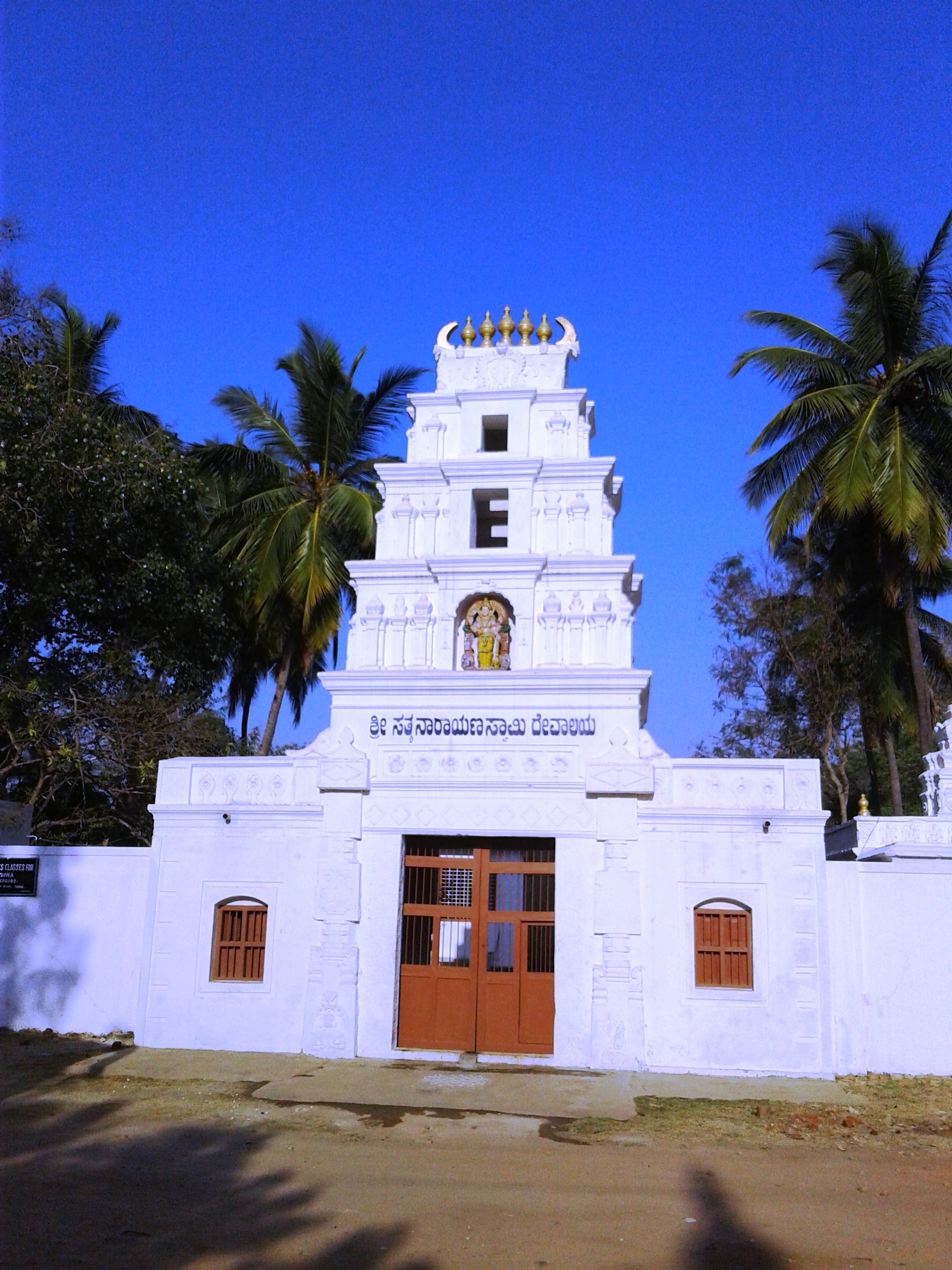
Sri Sathyanarayana Temple

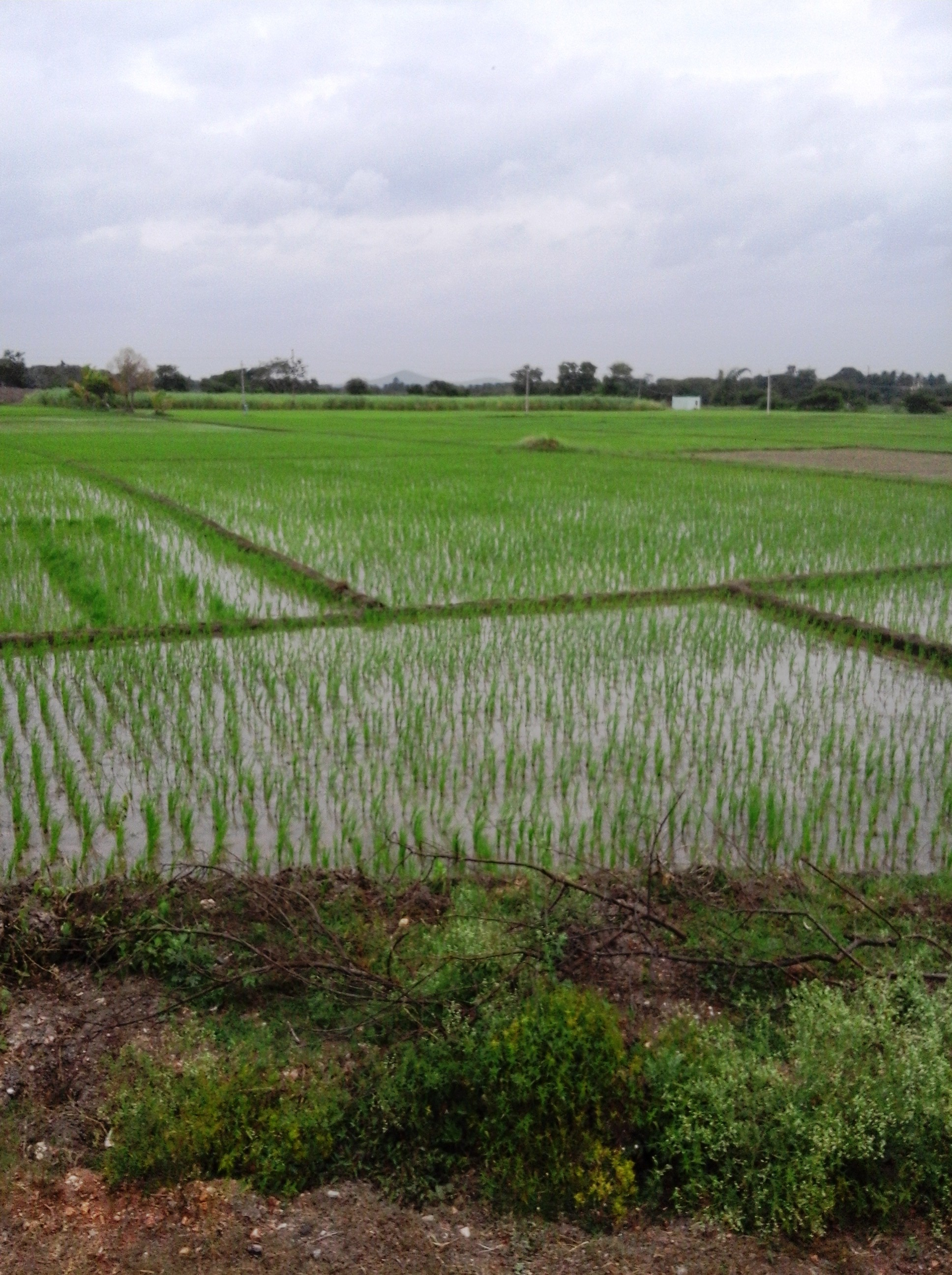
Paddy fields at Nanjangud

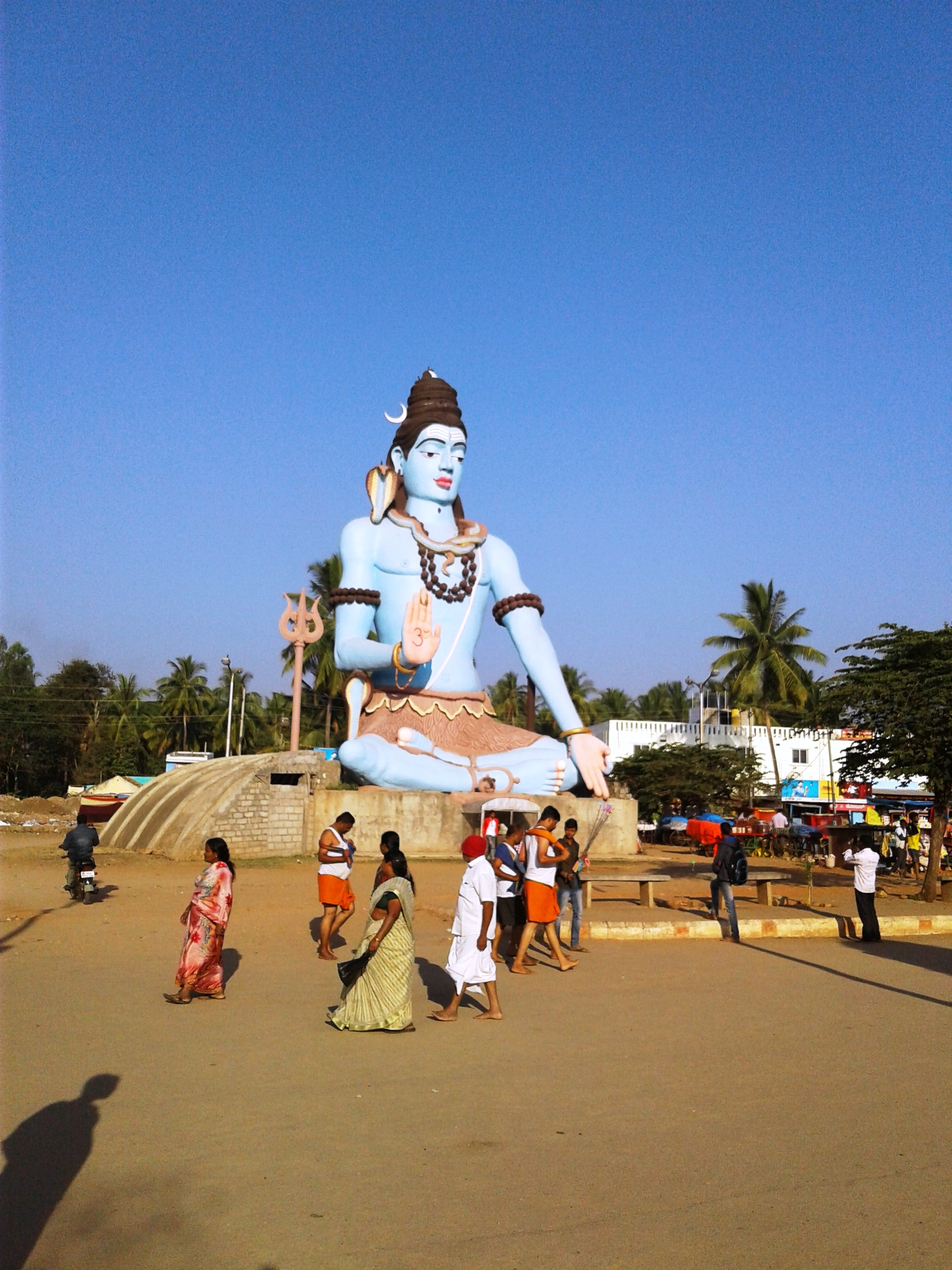
Statue of Shiva, near Srikanteshwara Temple
