= Golur Bridge =

Indian village

Coordinates: 12.117114°N 76.705253°E

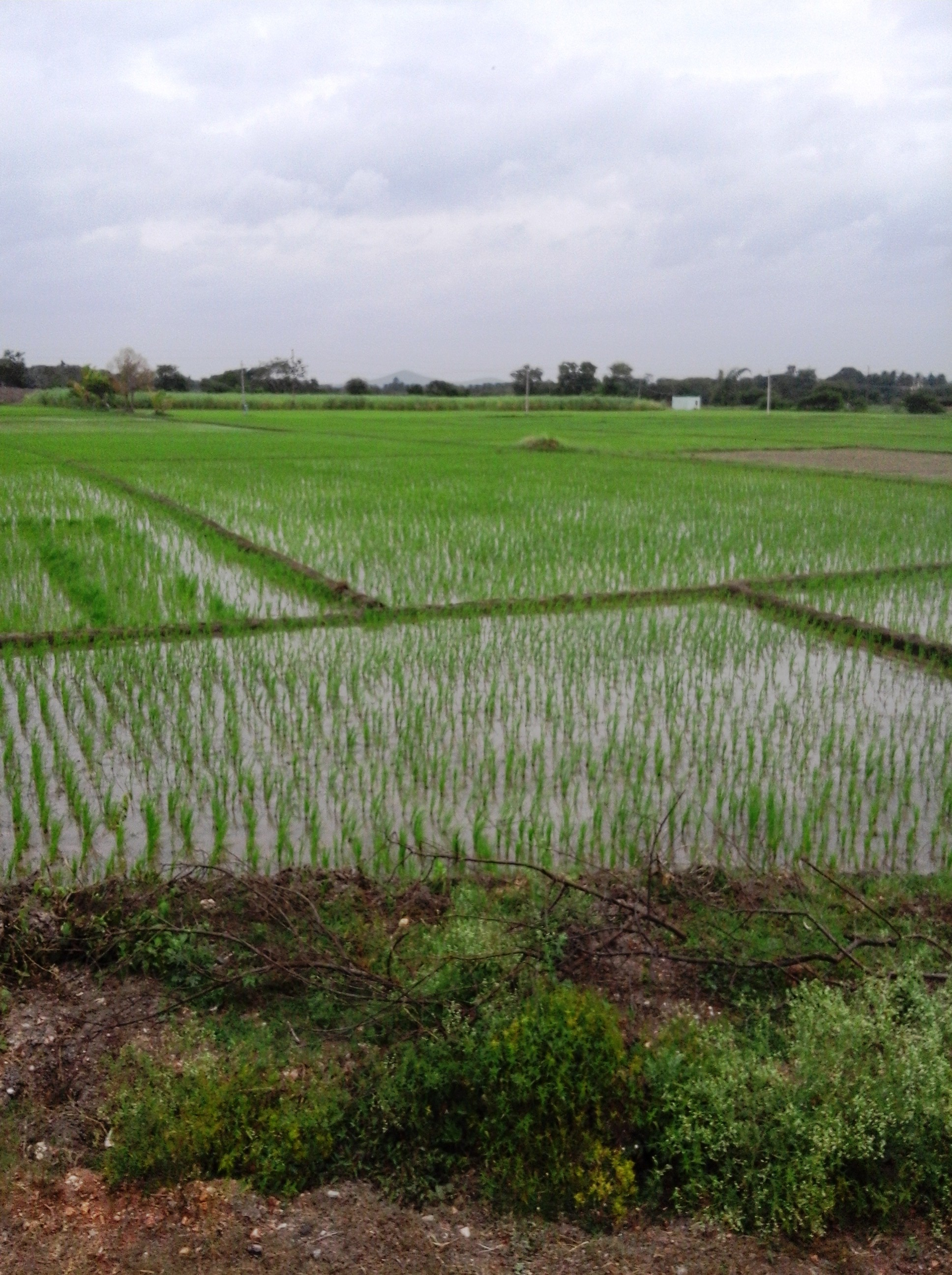
Paddy fields at Golur

Golur is a small village in Mysore district of Karnataka state, India. It is located 2 kilometres (1.2 mi) east of Nanjangud town and forms a part of H. D. Kote Taluk.

== Demographics ==
Golur village has a population of 3,402 people.

== Image gallery ==
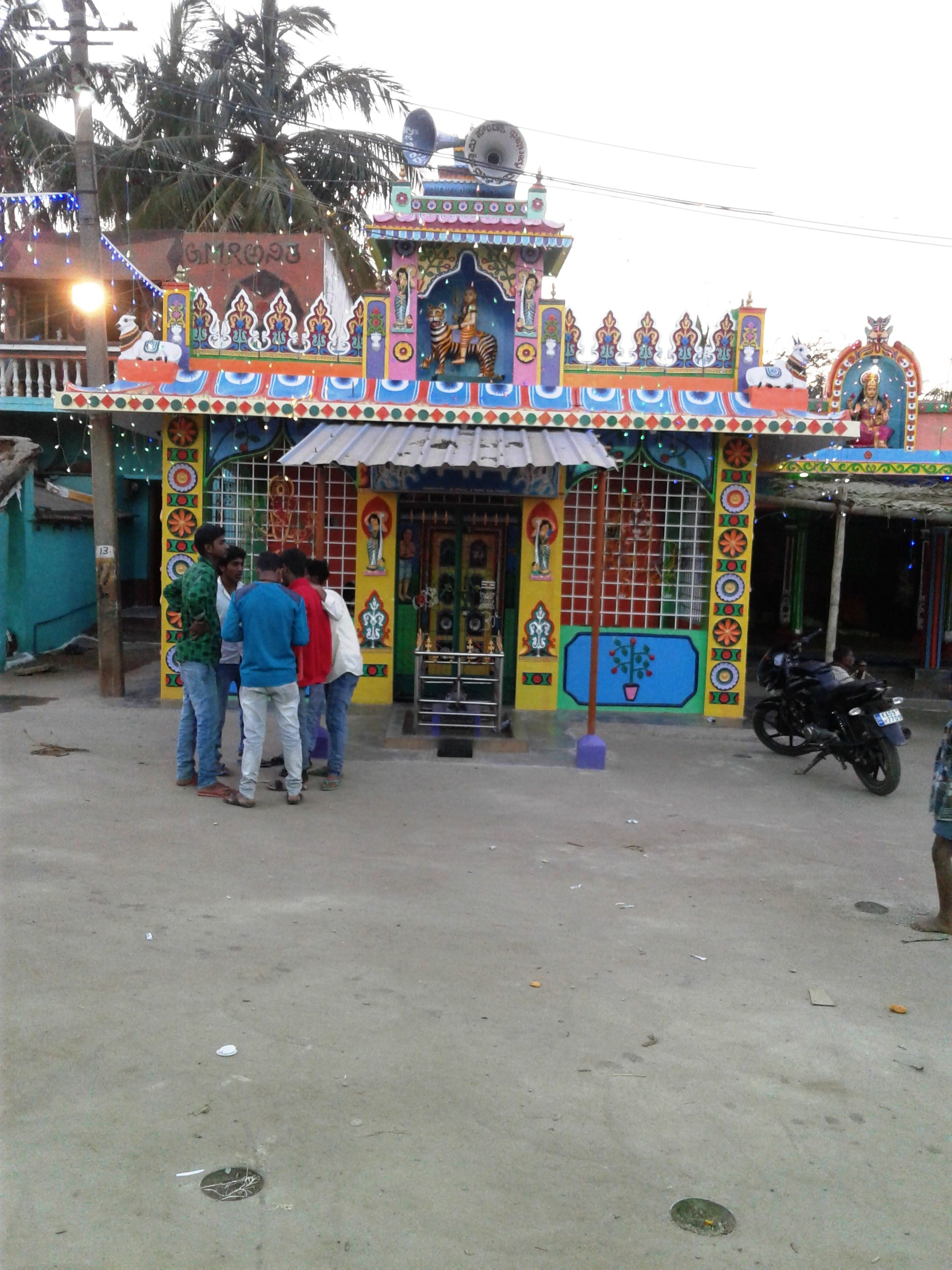
Village temple

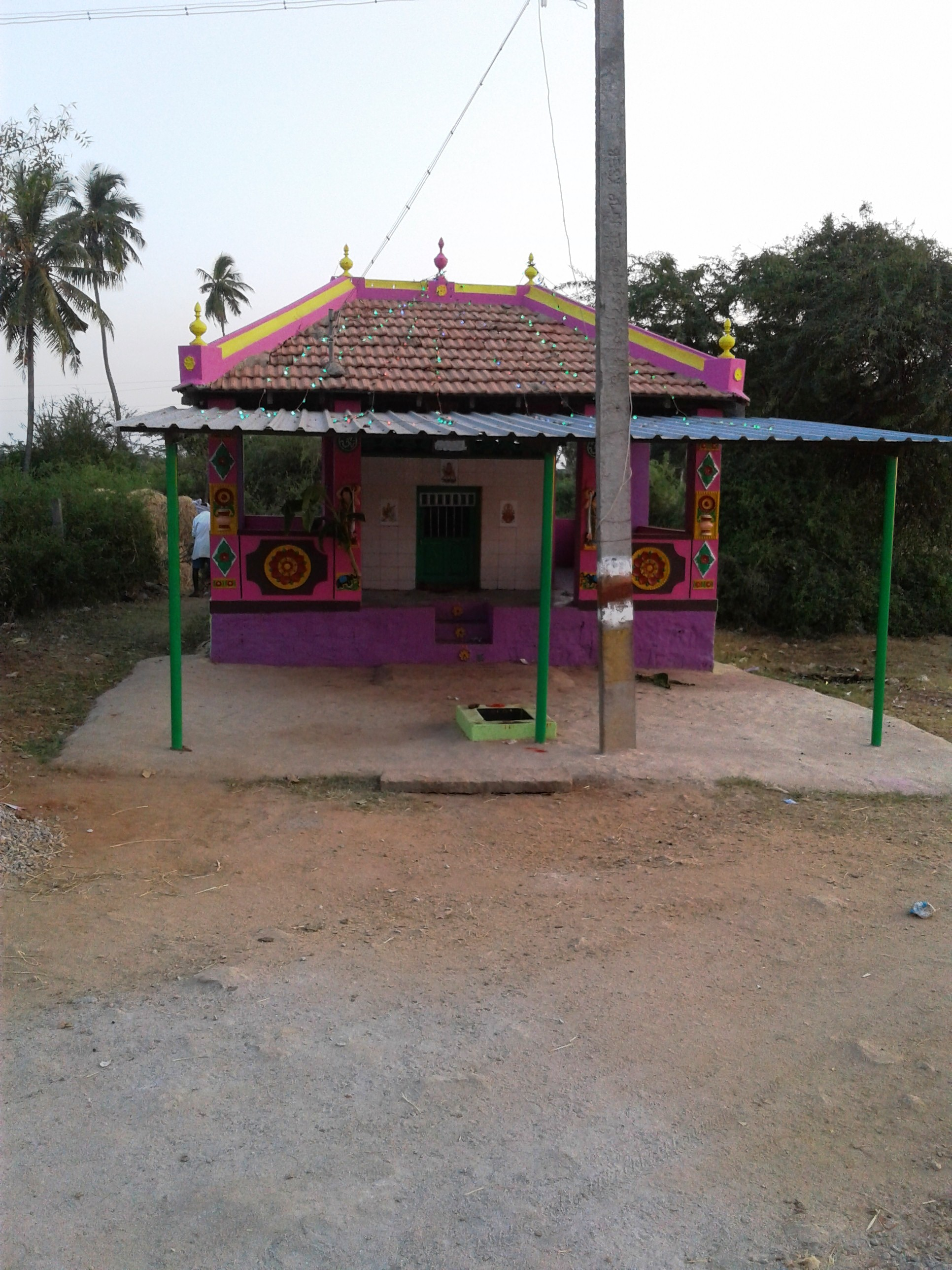
Prayer hall

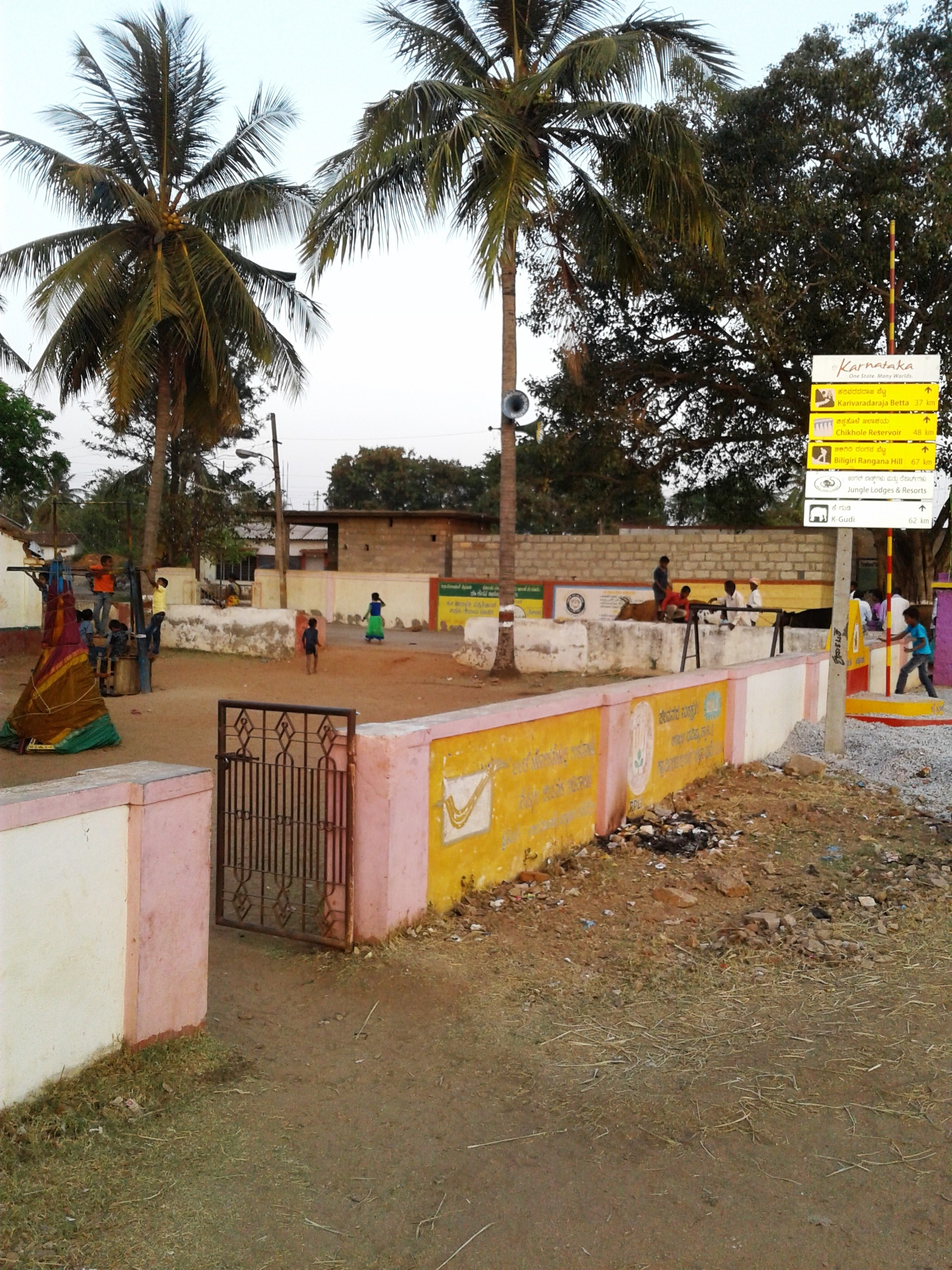
Primary School

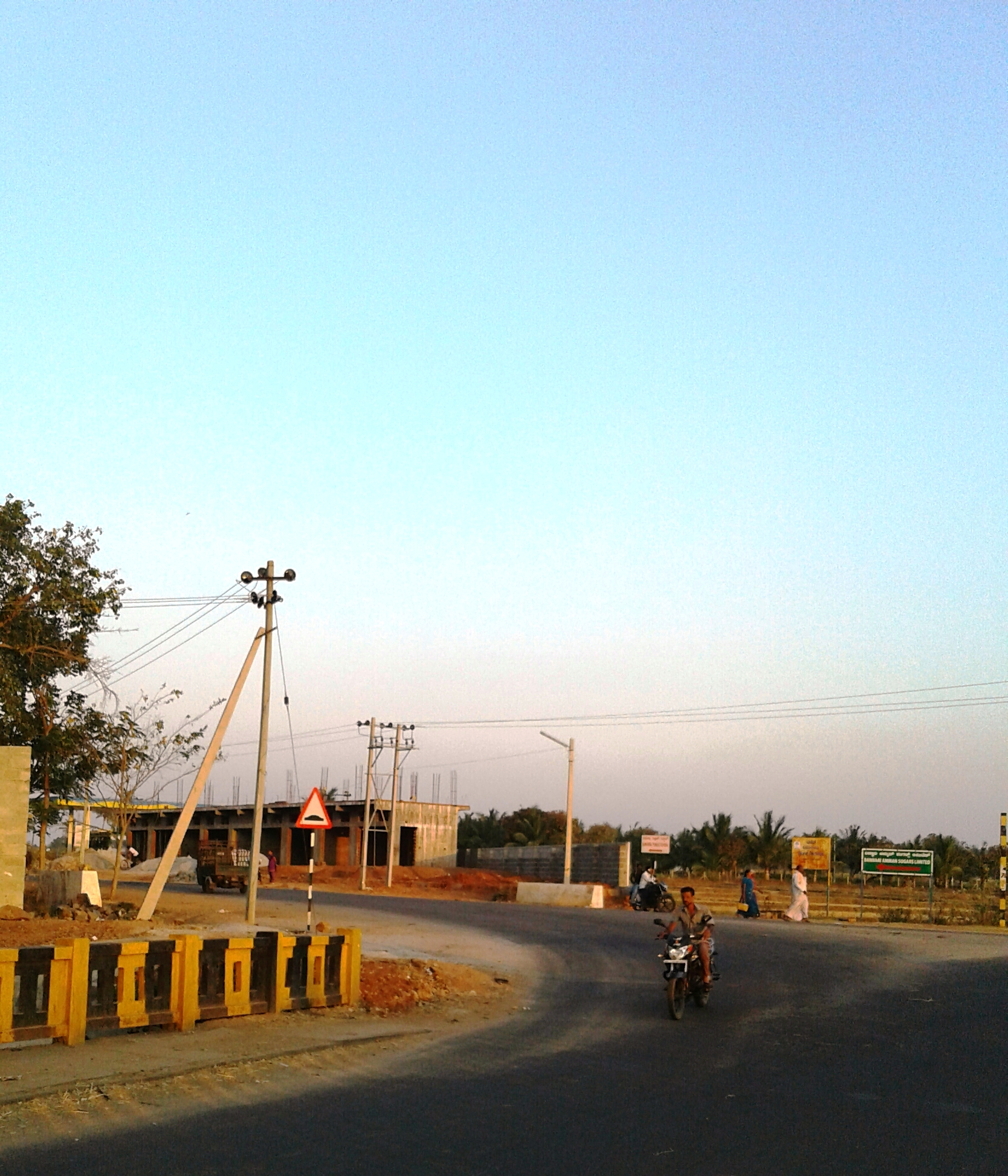
Golur Junction

== See also ==
- Hullahalli
