= Hullahalli =

- Village
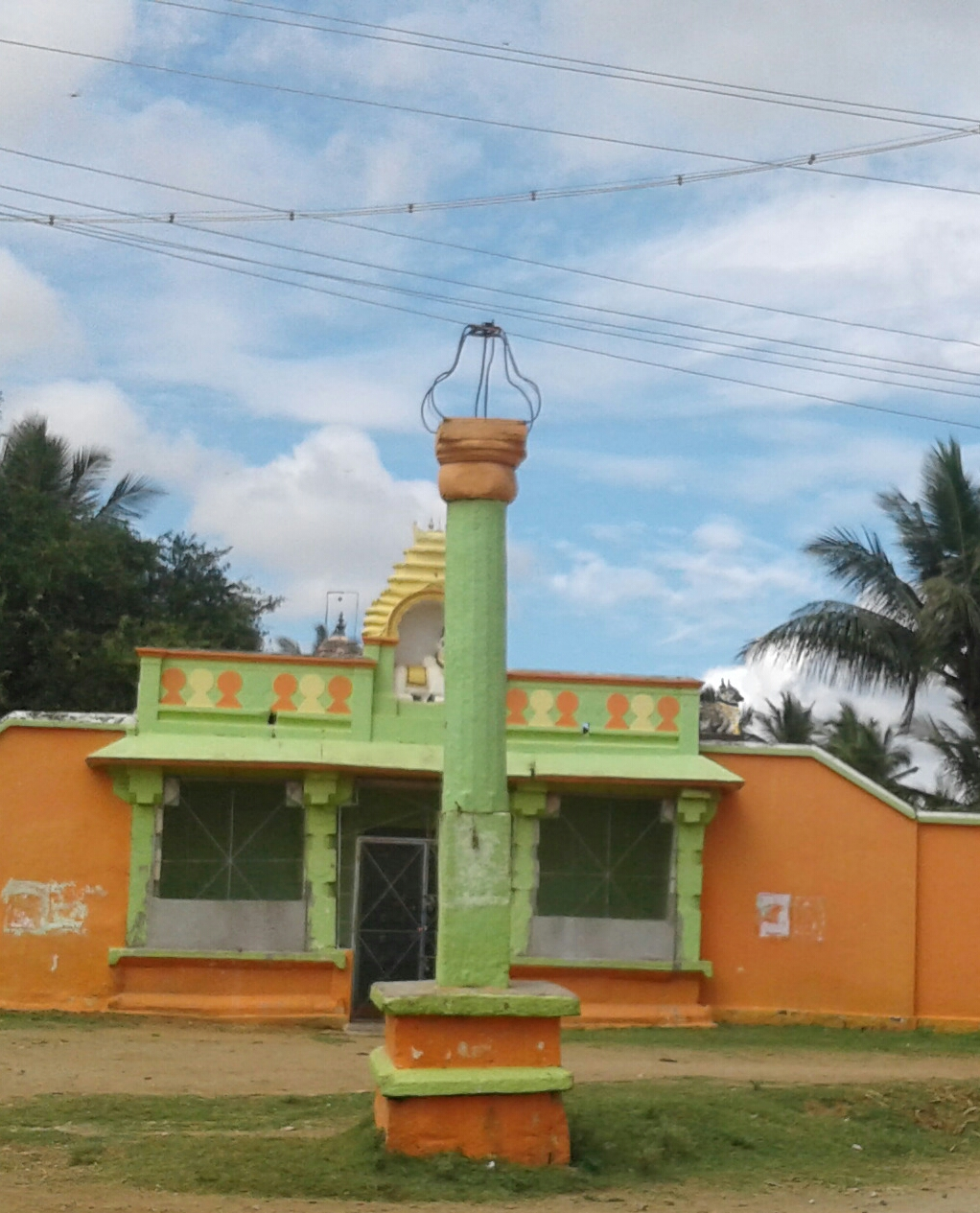
- Hullahalli temple
- Interactive map of Hullahalli
- Coordinates: 12°06′N 76°33′E
- Country: India
- State: Karnataka
- District: Mysore
- Talukas: Nanjangud

Government
  - Type: Panchayat raj
  - Body: Gram panchayat

Population (2011)
  - Total: 15,000

Languages
  - Official: Kannada
- Time zone: UTC+5:30 (IST)
- PIN: 571314
- Telephone code: 08221(Nanjangud taluk)
- ISO 3166 code: IN-KA
- Vehicle registration: KA
- Nearest city: Mysore
- Website: karnataka.gov.in

Hullahalli is a village (Hobali) in Nanjangudu taluk, Mysore district, Karnataka state, India.

== Demographics ==
As of 2001 India census, Hullahalli had a population of 1100 with 498 males and 418 females.

== Image gallery ==
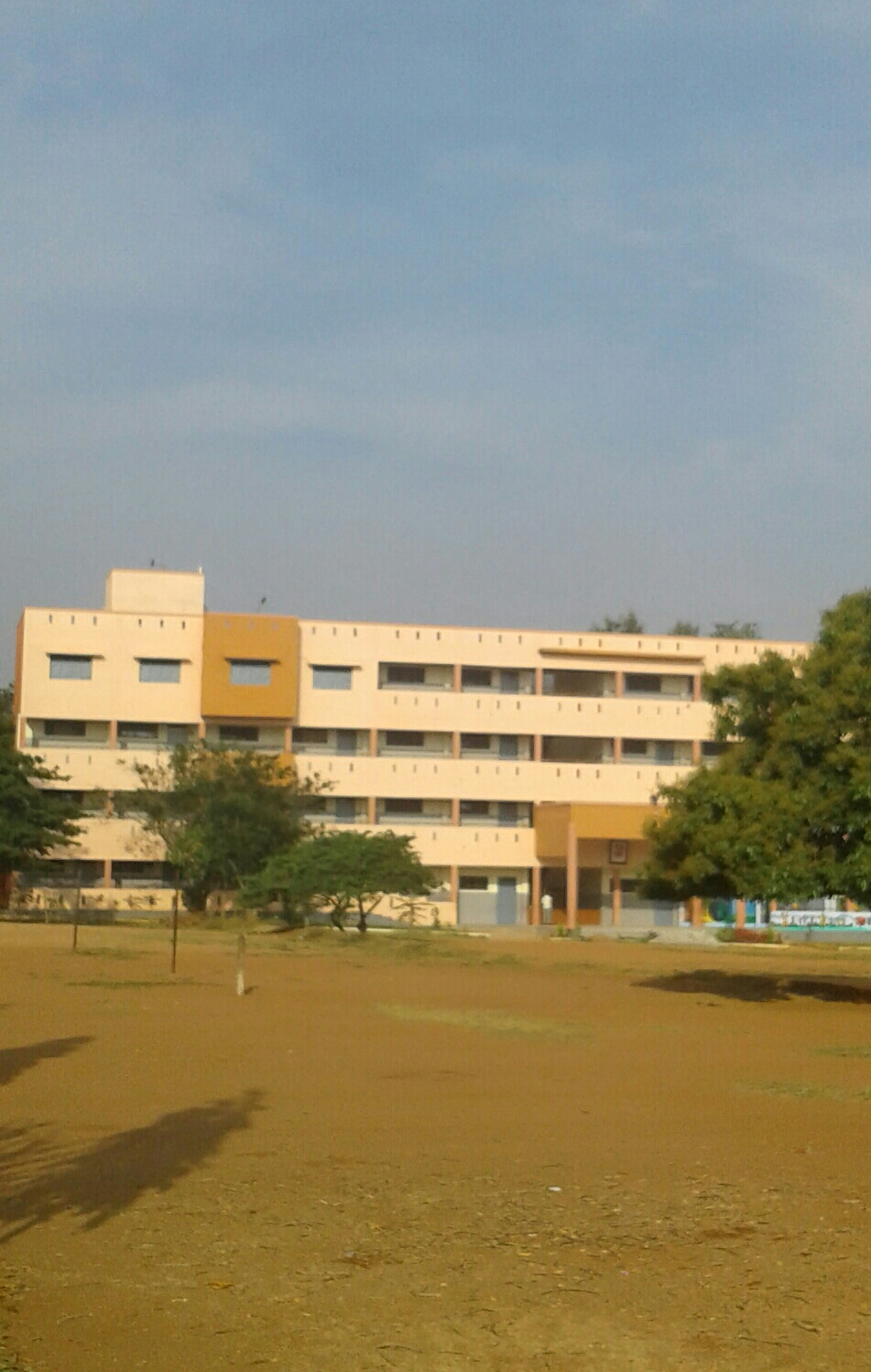
JSS Highschool, Hullalli

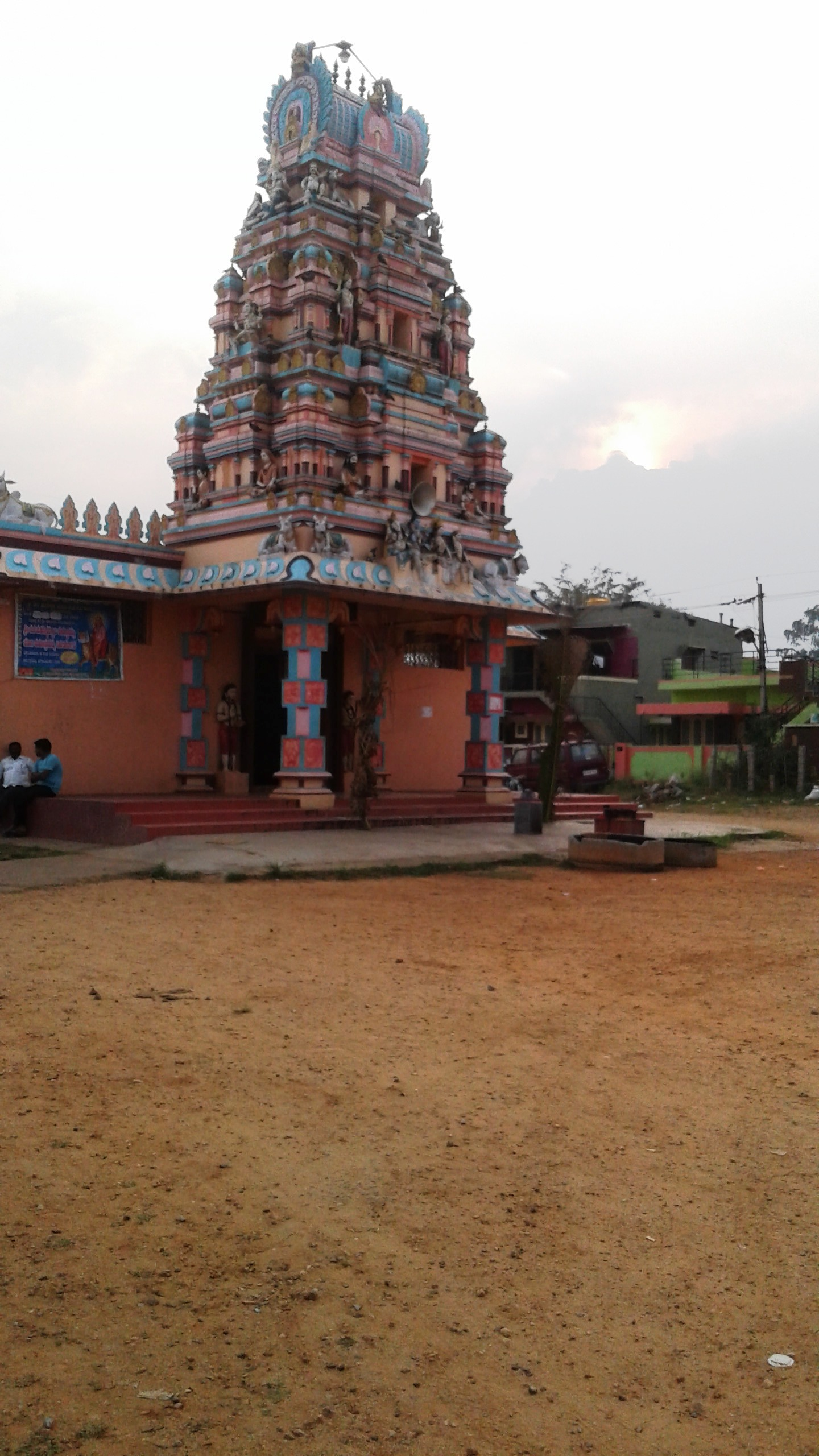
Madeshwara Temple

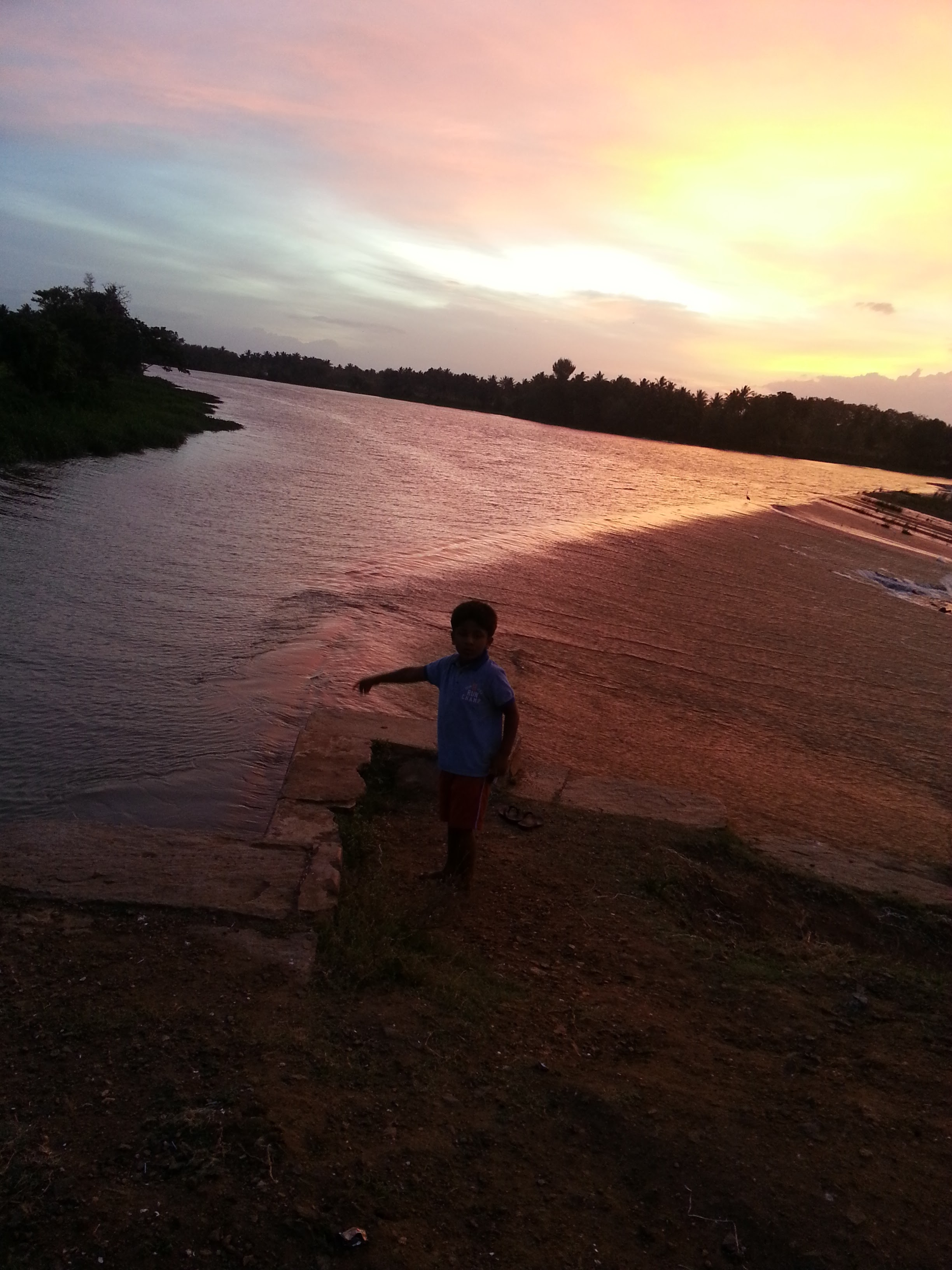
Sun Set in Hullahalli Katte

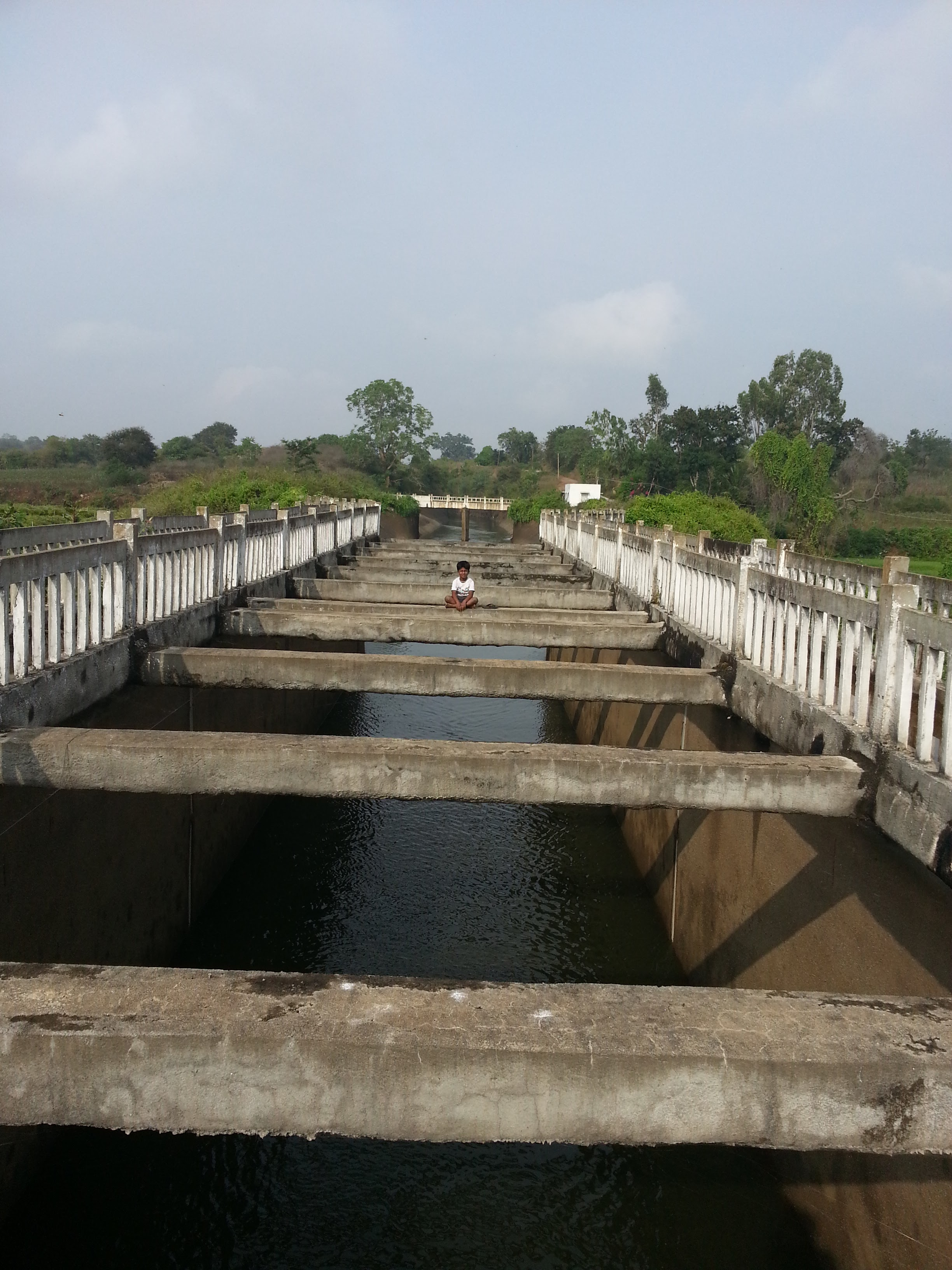
Open aqueduct near Hullahalli

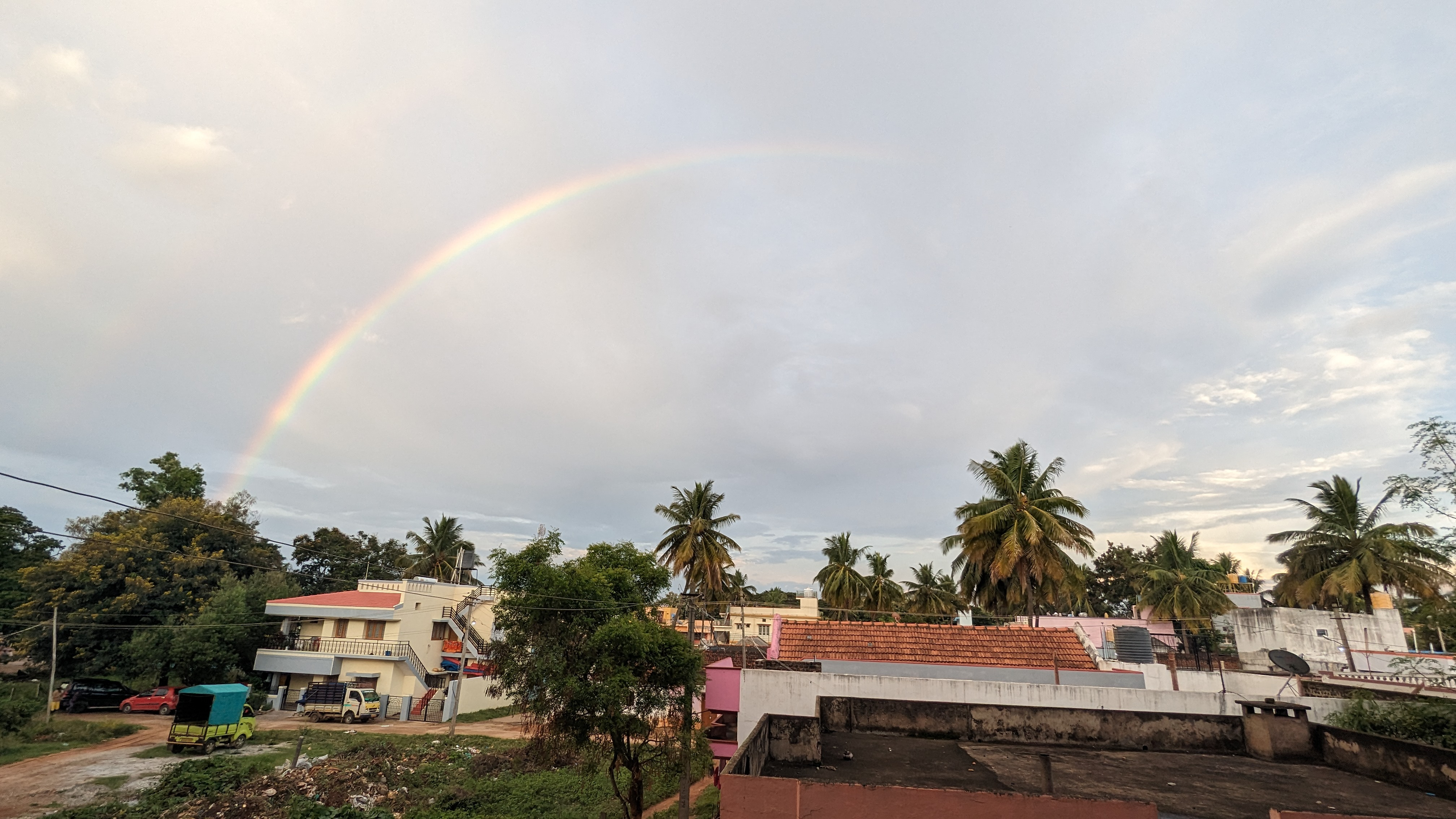
Sun Sett

== See also ==
- Nanjangud
- Golur Bridge
