= List of songs recorded by Kishore Kumar =

This is an alphabetical list of known Hindi, Bengali, Assamese, Kannada, Malayalam, and Marathi songs performed by Kishore Kumar from 1946 till 1987. Over 2600 songs are listed here. Moreover, singers recreate songs of Kumar duets.

== Hindi songs ==
=== 1940s ===
==== 1946 ====
Film	No.	Song	Composer(s)	Writer(s)	Co-artist(s)
Aath Din	1	"Banka Sipaiya Ghar Jaye To"	S. D. Burman	Gopal Singh Nepali, Qamar Jalalabadi	solo
Shikari	2	"O Rangeela Rangeela Rangeela"	S. D. Burman	N/A	Arun Kumar, Paro

==== 1948 ====
Film	No.	Song	Composer(s)	Writer(s)	Co-artist(s)
Ziddi	3	"Yeh Kaun Aaya Re"	Khemchand Prakash	Prem Dhawan	Lata Mangeshkar
Ziddi	4	"Marne Ki Duayen Kyun Maangu"	Khemchand Prakash	Professor Jazbi	solo

==== 1949 ====
Film	No.	Song	Composer(s)	Writer(s)	Co-artist(s)
Kaneez	5	"Duniya Mein Ameeron Ko"	Ghulam Haider	Hasrat Lucknowi, S. D. Batish	Mohammed Rafi
Rimjhim	6	"Jagmag Jagmag Karta Chand"	Khemchand Prakash	Bharat Vyas	solo
Rimjhim	7	"Mere Ghar Aage Hai"	Khemchand Prakash	P L Santoshi	Shamshad Begum
Rimjhim	8	"Mere Ghar Aage Hai" (version 2)	Khemchand Prakash	P L Santoshi	Shamshad Begum

=== 1950s ===
==== 1950 ====
Film	No.	Song	Composer(s)	Writer(s)	Co-artist(s)
Hamara Ghar	9	"Kahan Chale Sarkar"	Chitragupta	Rammurti Chaturvedi	Shamshad Begum
Khiladi	10	"O Phool Chunanewale"	Hansraj Behl	Rajendra Krishan	solo
Muqaddar	11	"Jo Karna Hai Kar Lo Aaj"	Khemchand Prakash, Bhola Shreshtha	Raja Mehndi Ali Khan	Asha Bhosle
Muqaddar	12	"Aati Hai Yaad Humko"	Khemchand Prakash, Bhola Shreshtha	Raj Sekhar	Asha Bhosle
Muqaddar	13	"Baulama Hai Diya Tujhko Dil"	Jimmy	Raj Sekhar	Asha Bhosle
Muqaddar	14	"Ek Do Teen Char"	Jimmy	Bharat Vyas	Asha Bhosle
Pyar	15	"O Bewafa Ye To Bata"	S. D. Burman	Rajendra Krishan	Geeta Dutt
Pyar	16	"Ek Hum Aur Dusre Tum"	S. D. Burman	Rajendra Krishan	Geeta Dutt
Pyar	17	"Kachchi Pakki Sadko Pe"	S. D. Burman	Rajendra Krishan	solo
Pyar	18	"Mohabbat Ka Chota Sa Ek Aashiyana"	S. D. Burman	Rajendra Krishan	solo
Pyar	19	"Jalti Hai Dunia"	S. D. Burman	Rajendra Krishan	Shamshad Begum

==== 1951 ====
Film	No.	Song	Composer(s)	Writer(s)	Co-artist(s)
Adaa	20	"Hai Dil Diya"	Madan Mohan	Prem Dhawan	solo
Adaa	21	"Jo Tum Karo"	Madan Mohan	Prem Dhawan	Shamshad Begum
Andolan	22	"Prabhu Charnon Mein"	Pannalal Ghosh	Nayaz Haider	Shanti Sudha Ghosh, Manna Dey
Andolan	23	"Subah Ki Pehli Kiran Tak"	Pannalal Ghosh	Nayaz Haider	Shanti Sudha Ghosh, Manna Dey
Baazi	24	"Mere Labon Pe Chhipe"	S. D. Burman	Sahir Ludhianvi	solo
Bahar	25	"Kusoor Aapka Huzoor Aapka"	S. D. Burman	Rajendra Krishan	solo
Ek Nazar	26	"Naye Zamane Ki Muhabbat"	S. D. Burman	Rajendra Krishan	solo
Hamari Shaan	27	"Aayi Khabar Hai"	Chitragupta	Raja Mehndi Ali Khan	Shamshad Begum
Hamari Shaan	28	"Damdi Damdi Paisa Paisa"	Chitragupta	Anjum Jaipuri	Talat Mahmood, G. M. Durrani
Naujawan	29	"Pi Pi Piya"	S. D. Burman	Sahir Ludhianvi	Shamshad Begum
Naujawan	30	"Dekho Dekho Ji"	S. D. Burman	Sahir Ludhianvi	Lata Mangeshkar

==== 1952 ====
Film	No.	Song	Composer(s)	Writer(s)	Co-artist(s)
Ashiana	31	"O Madam"	Madan Mohan	Rajendra Krishan	Shamshad Begum
Chham Chhama Chham	32	"Jhoom Uthe Duniya"	O. P. Nayyar	P. L. Santoshi	Asha Bhosle
Chham Chhama Chham	33	"La La La Laddu Bhi Hai"	O. P. Nayyar	P. L. Santoshi	Asha Bhosle
Chham Chhama Chham	34	"Nain Mila Mila Zara"	O. P. Nayyar	P. L. Santoshi	Asha Bhosle
Chham Chhama Chham	35	"Pyaar Bhare Dil Hain"	O. P. Nayyar	P. L. Santoshi	Asha Bhosle
Chham Chhama Chham	36	"Chal Ro Ameeran Zak Zak"	O. P. Nayyar	P. L. Santoshi	Asha Bhosle
Chham Chhama Chham	37	"Yeh Duniya Hai Bazar"	O. P. Nayyar	P. L. Santoshi	Asha Bhosle
Chham Chhama Chham	38	"Tadapte Hai Machalte Hai"	O. P. Nayyar	P. L. Santoshi	Shamshad Begum
Jaal	39	"De Bhi Chuke Hum"	S. D. Burman	Sahir Ludhianvi	Geeta Dutt
Kafila	40	"Lehron Se Poochh Lo"	Husnlal Bhagatram	Vrajendra Gaur	Lata Mangeshkar
Kafila	41	"Woh Meri Taraf"	Husnlal Bhagatram	Vrajendra Gaur	solo
Maa	42	"Jiyo Jiyo Mere Laal"	S.K. Pal	Bharat Vyas	Manna Dey, Arun Kumar Mukherjee
Nazaria	43	"Are Re Mujhe Jaane Do"	Bhola Shreshtha	P. L. Santoshi	Asha Bhosle
Nazaria	44	"Carein Hai Beqaraar"	Bhola Shreshtha	P. L. Santoshi	solo
Nazaria	45	"Rasili Hai Ankhen"	Bhola Shreshtha	P. L. Santoshi	solo
Nazaria	46	"Yeh Kaali Ghata"	Bhola Shreshtha	P. L. Santoshi	Shamshad Begum
Rangili	47	"Baiyan Chhodo Balam"	Chic Chocolate	Raja Mehndi Ali Khan	solo
Saloni	48	"Ek Dil Sharmata Hai"	Basant Prakash	Raja Mehndi Ali Khan	Rajkumari
Shin Shinaki Babloo Boo	49	"Itne Mein Parde Se"	C. Ramchandra	P. L. Santoshi	Lata Mangeshkar
Shisham	50	"Dil Ho Gaya Shenti Palit"	Roshan	Nazim Panipati	solo
Sinbad Jahazi	51	"Tera Mera Mera Tera"	Chitragupta	Pandit Chand	Shamshad Begum
Shrimati Ji	52	"Aashiqon Ko Ishq Ne"	Jimmy	Raja Mehndi Ali Khan	Shamshad Begum
Shrimati Ji	53	"Aashiqon Ne Husn Ko"	Jimmy	Raja Mehndi Ali Khan	Shamshad Begum
Shrimati Ji	54	"Nain Mila Lo"	Jimmy	Raja Mehndi Ali Khan	Shamshad Begum
Tamasha	55	"Khali Peeli Kaahe Ko"	Manna Dey	Bharat Vyas	solo

==== 1953 ====
Film	No.	Song	Composer(s)	Writer(s)	Co-artist(s)
Aabshar	56	"Yeh Duniya Soot Boot Ki"	Mohammed D. Shafi	Wahid Qureshi	S. D. Batish, S. Balbir
Aaghosh	57	"Tu Hai Chanda To"	Roshan	Indeevar	Lata Mangeshkar
Chalis Baba Ek Chor	58	"Aa Meri Guiyan"	S. D. Burman	P L Santoshi	Lata Mangeshkar
Fareb	59	"Mere Sukh Dukh Ka Sansaar"	Anil Biswas	Majrooh Sultanpuri	solo
Fareb	60	"Husn Bhi Hai"	Anil Biswas	Majrooh Sultanpuri	solo
Fareb	61	"Aa Mohabbat Ki Basti Basayenge"	Anil Biswas	Majrooh Sultanpuri	Lata Mangeshkar
Humsafar	62	"Leela Aprambar"	Ustad Ali Akbar Khan	Sahir Ludhianvi	solo
Humsafar	63	"Tumhen Dulhan Mili"	Ustad Ali Akbar Khan	Sahir Ludhianvi	solo
Ladki	64	"Shaadi Shaadi Kismat Ki Baat Hai"	R. Sudarsanam, Dhaniram	Rajendra Krishan	solo
Ladki	65	"Aurat Na Ho Toh"	C. Ramchandra	Rajendra Krishan	solo
Laharen	66	"Aadha Titar Aadha Bater"	C. Ramchandra	Rajendra Krishan	Shamshad Begum
Laharen	67	"Idhar Mushkil Udhar Mushkil"	C. Ramchandra	Rajendra Krishan	solo
Laharen	68	"Lo Khili Khet Mein Sarso"	C. Ramchandra	Rajendra Krishan	Lata Mangeshkar
Malkin	69	"Aji Tumhi Kaho Ji"	Roshan	Rajendra Krishan	Mohammed Rafi
Malkin	70	"Kahin Se Oonchi"	Roshan	Rajendra Krishan	Mohammed Rafi
Malkin	71	"Lo Mil Gayi Degree"	Roshan	Rajendra Krishan	Mukesh
Malkin	72	"O Piya Mera Bhola"	Roshan	Rajendra Krishan	Lata Mangeshkar
Manchala	73	"Sardi Ka Bukhar Bura"	Chitragupta	Raja Mehndi Ali Khan	Chitragupta
Mashuqa	74	"Yeh Sama Hum Tum Jawan"	Roshan	Shailendra	Meena Kapoor
Naulakha Haar	75	"Mohe Laa De Naulakha Haar"	Bhola Shreshtha	Bharat Vyas	Shamshad Begum
Parineeta	76	"Aye Bandi Tum Begum Bano"	Arun Kumar Mukherjee	Bharat Vyas	Asha Bhosle
Shamsheer	77	"Gori Tere Liye Sabka Jiya Dole"	Arun Kumar	Vrajendra Gaur	Asha Bhosle

==== 1954 ====
Film	No.	Song	Composer(s)	Writer(s)	Co-artist(s)
Adhikar	78	"Tikdambazi Tikdambazi"	Avinash Vyas	Neelkanth Tiwari	solo
Adhikar	79	"Kamata Hoon Bahut Kuchh"	Avinash Vyas	Raja Mehndi Ali Khan	Geeta Dutt
Adhikar	80	"Dil Mein Hamare Kaun Samaya"	Avinash Vyas	Raja Mehndi Ali Khan	Asha Bhosle
Angarey	81	"Gori Ke Nainon Mein"	S. D. Burman	Sahir Ludhianvi	Shamshad Begum
Dhobi Doctor	82	"Chandni Raaton Mein"	Khayyam	Majrooh Sultanpuri, Ali Sardar Jafri	solo
Ilzaam	83	"Sun Meri Rasiya Balam"	Madan Mohan	Rajendra Krishan	Asha Bhosle
Ilzaam	84	"ABC ABC Mere Sapnon Mein"	Madan Mohan	Rajendra Krishan	Asha Bhosle
Ilzaam	85	"Dil Dhale Hawa Jab Chale"	Madan Mohan	Rajendra Krishan	Shamshad Begum
Mastana	86	"Kanwaron Ka Bhi Duniya Mein"	Madan Mohan	Rajendra Krishan	Shamshad Begum
Mastana	87	"Naache More Angana"	Madan Mohan	Rajendra Krishan	Mohammad Rafi
Miss Mala	88	"O Ri O Ri Koi Laari"	Chitragupta	Raja Mehndi Ali Khan	Geeta Dutt
Miss Mala	89	"Dekho Na Dekho Humein"	Chitragupta	Raja Mehndi Ali Khan	Geeta Dutt
Miss Mala	90	"Naachti Jhoomti Muskurati"	Chitragupta	Anjum Jaipuri	Geeta Dutt
Miss Mala	91	"Manzil Kahan Meri"	Chitragupta	Anjum Jaipuri	solo
Naukri	92	"Chhota Sa Ghar Hoga"	Salil Chowdhury	Shailendra	Shaila Belle
Naukri	93	"Ek Chhoti Si Naukri"	Salil Chowdhury	Shailendra	Shankar Dasgupta, Shyam Mitra
Naukri	94	"Arzi Hamari Yeh"	Salil Chowdhury	Shailendra	solo
Parichay	95	"Mera Ghoda Bada Hai Nigoda"	Vedpal	Keshav Trivedi	solo
Pehli Jhalak	96	"Charandas Ko Peene Ki"	C. Ramchandra	Rajendra Krishan	solo
Pehli Tarikh	97	"Din Hai Suhana"	Sudhir Phadke	Qamar Jalalabadi	solo
Taxi Driver	98	"Chahe Koi Khush Ho"	S. D. Burman	Sahir Ludhianvi	solo

==== 1955 ====
Film	No.	Song	Composer(s)	Writer(s)	Co-artist(s)
Baap Re Baap	99	"Phool Se Gaalon Pe"	O. P. Nayyar	Jan Nisar Akhtar	Asha Bhosle
Baap Re Baap	100	"Piya Piya Piya Mora Jiya Pukare"	O. P. Nayyar	Jan Nisar Akhtar	Asha Bhosle
Baap Re Baap	101	"Daal Kaise Gale"	O. P. Nayyar	Jan Nisar Akhtar	solo
Char Paise	102	"Chhan Chhan Baje"	B. D. Burman	Sartaj Rahmani	solo
House No. 44	103	"Oonche Sur Mein Gaaye Jaa"	S. D. Burman	Sahir Ludhianvi	solo
Joru Ka Bhai	104	"Dharam Par Maar Jaana"	Jaidev	Vishwamitra Adil	S. Balbir
Joru Ka Bhai	105	"Kaali Kaali Taaron Wali Raat"	Jaidev	Vishwamitra Adil	solo
Joru Ka Bhai	106	"Teri Nigah Ne Bekhud Bana Ke"	Jaidev	Vishwamitra Adil	Shamshad Begum, S. Balbir
Madbhare Nain	107	"Pehli Na Doosri"	S. D. Burman	Shailendra	solo
Madbhare Nain	108	"Deewane Armanon Ki Bheed Mein"	S. D. Burman	Shailendra	Asha Bhosle
Munimji	109	"Jeevan Ke Safar Mein"	S. D. Burman	Sahir Ludhianvi	solo
Raj Darbar	110	"Meethi Naarangi Lena"	Chitragupt	Gopal Singh Nepali	Shamshad Begum
Rukhsana	111	"Tere Jahan Se Chal Diye (Duet)"	Sajjad Hussain	Khumar Barabankvi	Asha Bhosle
Rukhsana	112	"Yeh Chaar Din Bahaar Ke"	Sajjad Hussain	Shakeel Badayuni	Asha Bhosle

==== 1956 ====
Film	No.	Song	Composer(s)	Writer(s)	Co-artist(s)
Aabroo	113	"Chhedoonga Main Saragam"	Bulo C. Rani	Raja Mehndi Ali Khan	solo
Awaaz	114	"Araram Tararam"	Salil Chowdhury	Zia Sarhadi	solo
Bhagam Bhag	115	"Hey Babu Yeh Hai Zamana Tera"	O. P. Nayyar	Majrooh Sultanpuri	Mohammed Rafi
Bhagam Bhag	116	"Chhod Chale Pyari Duniya Ko"	O. P. Nayyar	Majrooh Sultanpuri	solo
Bhai Bhai	117	"Mera Naam Abdul Rehman"	Madan Mohan	Rajendra Krishan	Lata Mangeshkar
Bhai Bhai	118	"Mera Bangla Hai Sansar"	Madan Mohan	Rajendra Krishan	solo
Dhake Ki Malmal	119	"Behta Paani Behta Jaaye"	Robin Chatterjee	D. N. Madhok	Asha Bhosle, Manna Dey
Fifty Fifty	120	"Aadhi Tum Kha Lo"	Madan Mohan	Rajendra Krishan	Mohammed Rafi
Fifty Fifty	121	"Mere Jaisa Nahi Milega"	Madan Mohan	Rajendra Krishan	Mohammed Rafi, Madan Mohan
Funtoosh	122	"Dene Wala Jab Bhi Deta Hai"	S. D. Burman	Sahir Ludhianvi	solo
Funtoosh	123	"Aye Mere Topi Palat Ke Aa"	S. D. Burman	Sahir Ludhianvi	solo
Funtoosh	124	"Dukhi Mann Mere"	S. D. Burman	Sahir Ludhianvi	solo
Funtoosh	125	"Humne Kisi Pe Dore Dalne Hai"	S. D. Burman	Sahir Ludhianvi	Asha Bhosle
Funtoosh	126	"Woh Dekhen To Unki Inayat"	S. D. Burman	Sahir Ludhianvi	Asha Bhosle
Mem Sahib	127	"Dil Dil Se Milakar Dekho (Male)"	Madan Mohan	Rajendra Krishan	solo
Naya Andaz	128	"Meri Neendon Mein"	O. P. Nayyar	Jan Nisaar Akhtar Khan	Shamshad Begum
Naya Andaz	129	"Tumhi Se Pyar"	O. P. Nayyar	Jan Nisaar Akhtar Khan	Shamshad Begum
Naya Andaz	130	"Aaj Suhani Raat"	O. P. Nayyar	Jan Nisaar Akhtar Khan	Shamshad Begum
Naya Andaz	131	"Chana Zor Garam"	O. P. Nayyar	Jan Nisaar Akhtar Khan	Shamshad Begum
Naya Andaz	132	"Dunia Ke Bazaar Mein"	O. P. Nayyar	Jan Nisaar Akhtar Khan	Mohammed Rafi
Naya Andaz	133	"Apna Toh Zamane Mein"	O. P. Nayyar	Jan Nisaar Akhtar Khan	solo
Naya Andaz	134	"Mehfil Mein Aaj Teri"	O. P. Nayyar	Jan Nisaar Akhtar Khan	solo
Naya Andaz	135	"Hawa Pichhle Pahar"	O. P. Nayyar	Jan Nisaar Akhtar Khan	solo
New Delhi	136	"Milte Hi Nazar"	Shankar-Jaikishan	Shailendra	solo
New Delhi	137	"Are Bhai Nikal Ke Aa Ghar Se"	Shankar-Jaikishan	Shailendra	solo
New Delhi	138	"Nakhrewali"	Shankar-Jaikishan	Shailendra	solo
Paisa Hi Paisa	139	"Le Le Re Sone Ka Laddu"	Anil Biswas	Majrooh Sultanpuri	Asha Bhosle, Lata Mangeshkar
Paisa Hi Paisa	140	"Aa Bhi Jaa Re Sanam"	Anil Biswas	Majrooh Sultanpuri	Asha Bhosle, Lata Mangeshkar
Paisa Hi Paisa	141	"Paise Ka Mantar"	Anil Biswas	Majrooh Sultanpuri	solo
Paisa Hi Paisa	142	"Is Duniya Ka Ulta Charkha"	Anil Biswas	Majrooh Sultanpuri	solo
Paisa Hi Paisa	143	"Fariyad Hai Fariyad Suno"	Anil Biswas	Majrooh Sultanpuri	solo
Paisa Hi Paisa	144	"Naa Naa Gori Chhod Mujhe"	Anil Biswas	Majrooh Sultanpuri	Mohammed Rafi
Paisa Hi Paisa	145	"Dil Ne Maanga Pyaar"	Anil Biswas	Majrooh Sultanpuri	Mohammad Rafi, Asha Bhosle
Parivar	146	"Kuven Mein Kud Ke"	Salil Chowdhury	Shailendra	solo
Parivar	147	"Hum Jaa Pahunchhe Honululu"	Salil Chowdhury	Shailendra	solo

==== 1957 ====
Film	No.	Song	Composer(s)	Writer(s)	Co-artist(s)
Aasha	148	"Haal Tujhe Apni Duniya Ka"	C. Ramchandra	Rajendra Krishan	solo
Aasha	149	"Eena Meena Deeka (Male)"	C. Ramchandra	Rajendra Krishan	solo
Aasha	150	"Ek Padosi Raat Ko"	C. Ramchandra	Rajendra Krishan	solo
Bandi	151	"Chup Ho Jaa"	Hemant Kumar	Rajendra Krishan	solo
Bandi	152	"Ek Roz Hamari Bhi"	Hemant Kumar	Rajendra Krishan	solo
Bandi	153	"Ghar Ki Raunaq Hai"	Hemant Kumar	Rajendra Krishan	Geeta Dutt
Begunah	154	"Aaja Raat Beeti Jaaye"	Shankar-Jaikishan	Shailendra	Usha Mangeshkar
Begunah	155	"Aaj Na Jaane Paagal"	Shankar-Jaikishan	Hasrat Jaipuri	solo
Miss Mary	156	"Gaana Na Aaya"	Hemant Kumar	Rajendra Krishan	solo
Musafir	157	"Munna Bada Pyara"	Salil Chowdhury	Shailendra	solo
Nau Do Gyarah	158	"Hum Hai Raahi Pyaar Ke"	S. D. Burman	Majrooh Sultanpuri	solo
Nau Do Gyarah	159	"Ankhon Mein Kya Ji"	S. D. Burman	Majrooh Sultanpuri	Asha Bhosle
Paying Guest	160	"O Nigahen Mastana"	S. D. Burman	Majrooh Sultanpuri	Asha Bhosle
Paying Guest	161	"Chhod Do Aanchal"	S. D. Burman	Majrooh Sultanpuri	Asha Bhosle
Paying Guest	162	"Haye Haye Haye Yeh Nigahen"	S. D. Burman	Majrooh Sultanpuri	solo
Paying Guest	163	"Maana Janaab Ne Pukara Nahin"	S. D. Burman	Majrooh Sultanpuri	solo

==== 1958 ====
Film	No.	Song	Composer(s)	Writer(s)	Co-artist(s)
Chalti Ka Naam Gaadi	164	"Haal Kaisa Hai Janaab Ka"	S. D. Burman	Majrooh Sultanpuri	Asha Bhosle
Chalti Ka Naam Gaadi	165	"Main Sitaron Ka Tarana"	S. D. Burman	Majrooh Sultanpuri	Asha Bhosle
Chalti Ka Naam Gaadi	166	"Babu Samjho Ishaare"	S. D. Burman	Majrooh Sultanpuri	Manna Dey
Chalti Ka Naam Gaadi	167	"Ek Ladki Bheegi Bhaagi Si"	S. D. Burman	Majrooh Sultanpuri	solo
Chalti Ka Naam Gaadi	168	"In Haathon Se Sabki Gaadi"	S. D. Burman	Majrooh Sultanpuri	solo
Chalti Ka Naam Gaadi	169	"Hum The Woh Thi"	S. D. Burman	Majrooh Sultanpuri	solo
Chandan	170	"Bhare Pade Hain"	Madan Mohan	Rajendra Krishan	solo
Dilli Ka Thug	171	"C A T Cat Mane Billi"	Ravi	Majrooh Sultanpuri	Asha Bhosle
Dilli Ka Thug	172	"Yeh Raaten Yeh Mausam"	Ravi	Shailendra	Asha Bhosle
Dilli Ka Thug	173	"O Bandaria"	Ravi	Shailendra	solo
Dilli Ka Thug	174	"Hum To Mohabbat Karega"	Ravi	Majrooh Sultanpuri	solo
Kabhi Andhera Kabhi Ujala	175	"Surma Mera Nirala"	O. P. Nayyar	Majrooh Sultanpuri	solo
Kabhi Andhera Kabhi Ujala	176	"Jahanwalo Ise Kahte Hai Duniya"	O. P. Nayyar	Majrooh Sultanpuri	solo
Raagini	177	"Mujhko Baar Baar"	O. P. Nayyar	Qamar Jalalabadi	Asha Bhosle
Raagini	178	"Main Bangali Chhokra"	O. P. Nayyar	Qamar Jalalabadi	Asha Bhosle
Raagini	179	"Piya Main Hoon Patang Tu Dor"	O. P. Nayyar	Jan Nisar Akhtar	Asha Bhosle
Raagini	180	"Mud Mud Humko Dekhta"	O. P. Nayyar	Jan Nisar Akhtar	Asha Bhosle

==== 1959 ====
Film	No.	Song	Composer(s)	Writer(s)	Co-artist(s)
Chacha Zindabad	181	"Ae Haseeno Nazneeno"	Madan Mohan	Rajendra Krishan	solo
Chacha Zindabad	182	"Des Chhudaye Bhes Chhudaye"	Madan Mohan	Rajendra Krishan	solo
Chacha Zindabad	183	"Badi Cheez Hai Pyar Mohabbat"	Madan Mohan	Rajendra Krishan	Lata Mangeshkar
Chacha Zindabad	184	"Bach Gaye Hum Dono"	Madan Mohan	Rajendra Krishan	Lata Mangeshkar
Jal Saz	185	"Ararara Todo Na Dil"	Datta Naik	Majrooh Sultanpuri	Asha Bhosle
Jal Saz	186	"Pyaar Ka Jahaan Ho"	Datta Naik	Majrooh Sultanpuri	Asha Bhosle
Jal Saz	187	"Mere Dil Meri Jaan"	Datta Naik	Majrooh Sultanpuri	Asha Bhosle
Jal Saz	188	"Aaja Meri Jaan"	Datta Naik	Majrooh Sultanpuri	Asha Bhosle
Jal Saz	189	"Hip Hip Ho Ho Hurra"	Datta Naik	Majrooh Sultanpuri	Asha Bhosle
Jal Saz	190	"Jab Jab Tujhko Chhua"	Datta Naik	Majrooh Sultanpuri	Geeta Dutt
Jal Saz	191	"A B Hakka Hakka"	Datta Naik	Majrooh Sultanpuri	solo
Shararat	192	"Dekh Aasmaan Mein"	Shankar-Jaikishan	Hasrat Jaipuri	Geeta Dutt
Shararat	193	"Tune Mera Dil Le Liya"	Shankar-Jaikishan	Hasrat Jaipuri	Geeta Dutt
Shararat	194	"Hum Matwale Naujawan"	Shankar-Jaikishan	Hasrat Jaipuri	solo
Shararat	195	"Khol De Khol De Khidki"	Shankar-Jaikishan	Shailendra	solo

=== 1960s ===
==== 1960 ====
Film	No.	Song	Composer(s)	Writer(s)	Co-artist(s)
Apna Haath Jagannath	196	"Parmeet Bina Is Jahan Mein"	S. D. Burman	Kaifi Azmi	solo
Apna Haath Jagannath	197	"Ban Ke Gulgule"	S. D. Burman	Kaifi Azmi	solo
Apna Haath Jagannath	198	"Zindagi Yeh Usi Ki Hai"	S. D. Burman	Kaifi Azmi	solo
Apna Haath Jagannath	199	"Tum Jahan Jahan"	S. D. Burman	Kaifi Azmi	Asha Bhosle
Apna Haath Jagannath	200	"Chhayi Ghata Bijli"	S. D. Burman	Kaifi Azmi	Asha Bhosle
Bewaqoof	201	"Tumi Piya Chikara"	S. D. Burman	Majrooh Sultanpuri	Asha Bhosle
Bewaqoof	202	"Michael Hai Toh Cycle Hai"	S. D. Burman	Majrooh Sultanpuri	Asha Bhosle
Bewaqoof	203	"Tu Jaam Liye Jaa"	S. D. Burman	Majrooh Sultanpuri	Manna Dey
Bewaqoof	204	"Sach Sach Sach"	S. D. Burman	Majrooh Sultanpuri	solo
Girl Friend	205	"Jhuk Jhuk Bhuri Maa"	Hemant Kumar	Sahir Ludhianvi	solo
Girl Friend	206	"Main Paagal Hoon"	Hemant Kumar	Sahir Ludhianvi	solo
Girl Friend	207	"Aaj Rona Pada To"	Hemant Kumar	Sahir Ludhianvi	solo
Girl Friend	208	"Boom Booma Boom"	Hemant Kumar	Sahir Ludhianvi	Asha Bhosle
Girl Friend	209	"Aaj Mujhe Kuchh Kehna Hai"	Hemant Kumar	Sahir Ludhianvi	Sudha Malhotra
Girl Friend	210	"Na Dhela Lagta Hai"	Hemant Kumar	Sahir Ludhianvi	Daisy Irani
Gun Fight	211	"Yeh Hansi Dekh Le"	Iqbal	Muzaffar Shahjahanpuri	S. Balbir
Mehlon Ke Khwab	212	"Yeh Hai Zindagi Ki Rail"	S. Mohinder	Raja Mehndi Ali Khan	solo
Mehlon Ke Khwab	213	"Lo Ji Bujh Gayi Bijli"	S. Mohinder	Anand Bakshi	solo
Mehlon Ke Khwab	214	"Kamla Razia Ya Miss Mary"	S. Mohinder	Anand Bakshi	Asha Bhosle, Mahendra Kapoor
Mehlon Ke Khwab	215	"Ae Jaane Jigar"	S. Mohinder	Rahil Gorakhpuri	Asha Bhosle

==== 1961 ====
Film	No.	Song	Composer(s)	Writer(s)	Co-artist(s)
Jhumroo	216	"Are Baba Lu Baba"	Kishore Kumar	Majrooh Sultanpuri	Asha Bhosle
Jhumroo	217	"Ae Bhola Bhala"	Kishore Kumar	Majrooh Sultanpuri	Asha Bhosle
Jhumroo	218	"Babu Aana Sunte Jaana"	Kishore Kumar	Majrooh Sultanpuri	Asha Bhosle
Jhumroo	219	"Hey Jhoome Re"	Kishore Kumar	Majrooh Sultanpuri	Asha Bhosle
Jhumroo	220	"Koi Albela Mastana"	Kishore Kumar	Majrooh Sultanpuri	Asha Bhosle
Jhumroo	221	"Aaja Tu Aaja Aji Na"	Kishore Kumar	Majrooh Sultanpuri	Usha Mangeshkar
Jhumroo	222	"Thandi Hawa Yeh Chandni Suhani"	Kishore Kumar	Majrooh Sultanpuri	solo
Jhumroo	223	"Matwale Hum Matwale"	Kishore Kumar	Majrooh Sultanpuri	solo
Jhumroo	224	"Main Hoon Jhoom Jhoom Jhumroo"	Kishore Kumar	Majrooh Sultanpuri	solo
Jhumroo	225	"Ge Ge Geli"	Kishore Kumar	Majrooh Sultanpuri	solo
Jhumroo	226	"Koi Humdum Na Raha"	Kishore Kumar	Majrooh Sultanpuri	solo
Krorepati	227	"O Ladke Badhte Badhte"	Shankar-Jaikishan	Shailendra	Lata Mangeshkar
Krorepati	228	"O Meri Maina"	Shankar-Jaikishan	Shailendra	Mohammed Rafi
Krorepati	229	"Dekhne Walon Thaam Lo"	Shankar-Jaikishan	Shailendra	solo
Krorepati	230	"Kabul Ki Main Naar"	Shankar-Jaikishan	Hasrat Jaipuri	Geeta Dutt
Neela Aasmaan	231	"Teri Awaz Ban Ke"	Kishore Kumar	N/A	Asha Bhosle
Neela Aasmaan	232	"Akele Hum Akele Tum"	Kishore Kumar	N/A	Asha Bhosle
Neela Aasmaan	233	"Ek Panchi Deewana"	Kishore Kumar	N/A	solo
Neela Aasmaan	234	"Akela Hoon Main"	Kishore Kumar	Kishore Kumar	solo

==== 1962 ====
Film	No.	Song	Composer(s)	Writer(s)	Co-artist(s)
Bombay Ka Chor	235	"Hasrat Hai Raahi Humse"	Ravi	Rajendra Krishan	solo
Bombay Ka Chor	236	"Tera Yun Nazre Churana"	Ravi	Rajendra Krishan	solo
Bombay Ka Chor	237	"Hello Hello Ji"	Ravi	Rajendra Krishan	Asha Bhosle
Bombay Ka Chor	238	"Jawab De Ya Na De"	Ravi	Rajendra Krishan	Asha Bhosle
Half Ticket	239	"Aake Seedhi Lagi Dil Pe"	Salil Chowdhury	Shailendra	solo
Half Ticket	240	"Are Lelo Ji Lelo"	Salil Chowdhury	Shailendra	solo
Half Ticket	241	"Are Wah Re Mere Malik"	Salil Chowdhury	Shailendra	solo
Half Ticket	242	"Chill Chill Chilla Ke"	Salil Chowdhury	Shailendra	solo
Half Ticket	243	"Aankhon Mein Tum"	Salil Chowdhury	Shailendra	Geeta Dutt
Half Ticket	244	"Woh Ek Nigah Kya Mili"	Salil Chowdhury	Shailendra	Lata Mangeshkar
Half Ticket	245	"Chaand Raat Tum Ho Saath"	Salil Chowdhury	Shailendra	Lata Mangeshkar
Man-Mauji	246	"Bura Lagta Hai"	Madan Mohan	Rajendra Krishan	solo
Man-Mauji	247	"Zaroorat Hai"	Madan Mohan	Rajendra Krishan	solo
Man-Mauji	248	"Ek Tha Abdul Rehman"	Madan Mohan	Rajendra Krishan	Lata Mangeshkar
Naughty Boy	249	"Ab To Batla Arre Zalim"	S. D. Burman	Shailendra	Asha Bhosle
Naughty Boy	250	"Sa Sa Sa Re"	S. D. Burman	Shailendra	Asha Bhosle
Naughty Boy	251	"Jahan Bhi Gaye Hum"	S. D. Burman	Shailendra	Asha Bhosle
Naughty Boy	252	"Nazren Milake Jo"	S. D. Burman	Shailendra	solo
Naughty Boy	253	"Haye Haye Woh Matwali Ada"	S. D. Burman	Shailendra	solo
Naughty Boy	254	"Rang Yeh Duniya"	S. D. Burman	Shailendra	solo
Rungoli	255	"Hum Bechare Pyaar Ke Maare"	Shankar-Jaikishan	Hasrat Jaipuri	solo
Rungoli	256	"Rangoli Sajao Re"	Shankar-Jaikishan	Hasrat Jaipuri	solo
Rungoli	257	"Chhoti Si Yeh Duniya"	Shankar-Jaikishan	Shailendra	solo
Rungoli	258	"Ek Nazar Kisi Ne Dekha"	Shankar-Jaikishan	Shailendra	Lata Mangeshkar

==== 1963 ====
Film	No.	Song	Composer(s)	Writer(s)	Co-artist(s)
Ek Raaz	259	"Payal Wali Dekhna"	Chitragupta	Majrooh Sultanpuri	solo
Ek Raaz	260	"Laale Di Jaan"	Chitragupta	Majrooh Sultanpuri	solo
Ek Raaz	261	"Agar Sun Le To"	Chitragupta	Majrooh Sultanpuri	solo
Ek Raaz	262	"Ajnabi Se Ban Ke Karo"	Chitragupta	Majrooh Sultanpuri	Lata Mangeshkar
Ek Raaz	263	"Naghma-e-Dil Ko Chhed De"	Chitragupta	Majrooh Sultanpuri	Lata Mangeshkar
Suhana Geet	264	"Are Kidhar Chale Ho"	N/A	N/A	solo
Suhana Geet	265	"Baje Baje Hain Kahi Bansuri"	N/A	N/A	solo
Suhana Geet	266	"Deep Jale Deep Bujhe	N/A	N/A	solo
Suhana Geet	267	"Lo Shaam Hui"	N/A	N/A	solo
Suhana Geet	268	"Chale Chal Ae Mere Dil"	N/A	N/A	Manna Dey

==== 1964 ====
Film	No.	Song	Composer(s)	Writer(s)	Co-artist(s)
Baaghi Shahzada	269	"Ae Dil Bahek Na Jaana"	Bipin Datta	Noor Devasi	solo
Baaghi Shahzada	270	"Main Hoon Baaghi Shahzada"	Bipin Datta	Noor Devasi	solo
Baaghi Shahzada	271	"Yeh Nazrana Mohabbat Ka"	Bipin Datta	Noor Devasi	Kamal Barot
Daal Me Kala	272	"Utha Le Humen Uparwale"	C. Ramchandra	N/A	C. Ramchandra
Daal Me Kala	273	"O Jhoom Jhoom"	C. Ramchandra	N/A	solo
Daal Me Kala	274	"Chand Chup Chap Hai"	C. Ramchandra	Bharat Vyas	solo
Daal Me Kala	275	"Do Aankhen Janaani"	C. Ramchandra	Bharat Vyas	Asha Bhosle
Door Gagan Ki Chhaon Mein	276	"Koi Lauta De Mere Bachpan"	Kishore Kumar	Shailendra	solo
Door Gagan Ki Chhaon Mein	277	"Jin Raaton Ki Bhor Nahi Hai"	Kishore Kumar	Shailendra	solo
Door Gagan Ki Chhaon Mein	278	"Aa Chal Ke Tujhe"	Kishore Kumar	Kishore Kumar	solo
Ganga Ki Lahren	279	"Chhedo Na Meri Zulfen"	Chitragupta	Majrooh Sultanpuri	Lata Mangeshkar
Ganga Ki Lahren	280	"Ganga Ki Lahren"	Chitragupta	Majrooh Sultanpuri	Lata Mangeshkar
Ganga Ki Lahren	281	"Aa Jaaneman Hans Lo Zara"	Chitragupta	Majrooh Sultanpuri	solo
Mr. X in Bombay	282	"Mere Mehboob Qayamat Hogi"	Laxmikant-Pyarelal	Anand Bakshi	solo
Mr. X in Bombay	283	"Mere Mehboob Qayamat Hogi (version 2)"	Laxmikant-Pyarelal	Anand Bakshi	solo
Mr. X in Bombay	284	"Ruk Ja Rokta Hai Ye Diwana"	Laxmikant-Pyarelal	Anand Bakshi	solo
Mr. X in Bombay	285	"Khoobsurat Hasina"	Laxmikant-Pyarelal	Anand Bakshi	Lata Mangeshkar
Mr. X in Bombay	286	"Chali Re Chali Gori"	Laxmikant-Pyarelal	Anand Bakshi	Lata Mangeshkar

==== 1965 ====
Film	No.	Song	Composer(s)	Writer(s)	Co-artist(s)
Bhoot Bungla	287	"Ek Sawaal Hai Tumse"	R. D. Burman	Hasrat Jaipuri	solo
Bhoot Bungla	288	"Jaago Sone Walon"	R. D. Burman	Hasrat Jaipuri	solo
Guide	289	"Gaata Rahe Mera Dil"	S. D. Burman	Shailendra	Lata Mangeshkar
Hum Sab Ustad Hain	290	"Ajnabi Tum Jaane Pehchane (Male)"	Laxmikant-Pyarelal	Asad Bhopali	solo
Hum Sab Ustad Hain	291	"Pyaar Baante Chalo"	Laxmikant-Pyarelal	Asad Bhopali	solo
Hum Sab Ustad Hain	292	"Suno Jaana"	Laxmikant-Pyarelal	Asad Bhopali	solo
Hum Sab Ustad Hain	293	"Kya Teri Zulfein Hai"	Laxmikant-Pyarelal	Asad Bhopali	Asha Bhosle
Johar-Mehmood in Goa	294	"Kuch Bhi Kahe Duniyawale"	Kalyanji-Anandji	Qamar Jalalabadi	Shamshad Begum
Shreeman Funtoosh	295	"Yeh Dard Bhara Afsana"	Laxmikant-Pyarelal	Anand Bakshi	solo
Shreeman Funtoosh	296	"Sultana Sultana Tu Na Ghabrana"	Laxmikant-Pyarelal	Anand Bakshi	Lata Mangeshkar
Shreeman Funtoosh	297	"Woh Jharoke Se Jo Jhake"	Laxmikant-Pyarelal	Asad Bhopali	solo
Teen Devian	298	"Likha Hai Teri Ankhon Mein"	S. D. Burman	Majrooh Sultanpuri	Lata Mangeshkar
Teen Devian	299	"Uff Kitni Thandi Hai Yeh Rut"	S. D. Burman	Majrooh Sultanpuri	Lata Mangeshkar
Teen Devian	300	"Arre Yaar Meri Tum Bhi Ho Ghajab"	S. D. Burman	Majrooh Sultanpuri	Asha Bhosle
Teen Devian	301	"Khwab Ho Tum Ya"	S. D. Burman	Majrooh Sultanpuri	solo

==== 1966 ====
Film	No.	Song	Composer(s)	Writer(s)	Co-artist(s)
Akalmand	302	"Do Akalmand Hue Fikarmand"	O. P. Nayyar	Aziz Kashmiri	Mohammed Rafi
Akalmand	303	"Diya Hai Aapne"	O. P. Nayyar	Aziz Kashmiri	solo
Akalmand	304	"Khubsoorat Sathi Itni Baat Bata"	O. P. Nayyar	Aziz Kashmiri	Asha Bhosle
Akalmand	305	"Kya Rakha Hai Gyan Mein"	O. P. Nayyar	Pyarelal Santoshi	Mohammed Rafi
Ladka Ladki	306	"Suniye Suniye Aajkal Ki"	Madan Mohan	Rajendra Krishan	solo
Ladka Ladki	307	"Seekh Lo Seekh Lo"	Madan Mohan	Rajendra Krishan	Usha Mangeshkar
Pyar Kiye Jaa	308	"Sun Le Pyaar Ki Dushman Duniya"	Laxmikant-Pyarelal	Rajendra Krishan	Manna Dey, Asha Bhosle, Lata Mangeshkar
Pyar Kiye Jaa	309	"Pyar Kiye Jaa"	Laxmikant-Pyarelal	Rajendra Krishan	solo
Pyar Kiye Jaa	310	"Dil Humne De Diya"	Laxmikant-Pyarelal	Rajendra Krishan	Lata Mangeshkar

==== 1967 ====
Film	No.	Song	Composer(s)	Writer(s)	Co-artist(s)
Albela Mastana	311	"Pehle Aap Chaliye Na"	Datta Naik	Prem Dhawan	Mahendra Kapoor
Albela Mastana	312	"Main Albela Mastana"	Datta Naik	Prem Dhawan	solo
Duniya Nachegi	313	"Mar Jaoonga Kasam"	Laxmikant-Pyarelal	Raja Mehndi Ali Khan	solo
Duniya Nachegi	314	"Meri Raahon Mein"	Laxmikant-Pyarelal	Raja Mehndi Ali Khan	solo
Hum Do Daaku	315	"Hum Do Daaku"	Kishore Kumar	Shailendra	solo
Hum Do Daaku	316	"Allah Khair Baba Khair"	Kishore Kumar	Shailendra	solo
Hum Do Daaku	317	"Pag Ghungroo Bandh Guru Naach"	Kishore Kumar	Shailendra	solo
Hum Do Daaku	318	"Do Dino Ki Hai Kahani"	Kishore Kumar	Shailendra	Anoop Kumar
Hum Do Daaku	319	"Ae Haseeno Nazneeno"	Kishore Kumar	Shailendra	Asha Bhosle, Usha Mangeshkar
Jewel Thief	320	"Aasmaan Ke Neeche"	S. D. Burman	Majrooh Sultanpuri	Lata Mangeshkar
Jewel Thief	321	"Yeh Dil Na Hota Bechara"	S. D. Burman	Majrooh Sultanpuri	solo

==== 1968 ====
Film	No.	Song	Composer(s)	Writer(s)	Co-artist(s)
Abhilasha	322	"Pyar Hua Hai Jab Se"	R. D. Burman	Majrooh Sultanpuri	Lata Mangeshkar
Do Dooni Chaar	323	"Bada Badmaash Hai Yeh Dil"	Hemant Kumar	Gulzar	solo
Do Dooni Chaar	324	"Hawaon Pe Likhdo Hawaon Ke Naam"	Hemant Kumar	Gulzar	solo
Duniya	325	"Dooriyan Nazdeekiyan Ban Gayi"	Shankar-Jaikishan	Hasrat Jaipuri	Asha Bhosle
Farishta	326	"Ek Khubsoorat Ladki"	Dattaram	Asad Bhopali	Asha Bhosle
Haye Mera Dil	327	"Bas Qayamat Ho Gayi"	Usha Khanna	S. H. Bihari	solo
Haye Mera Dil	328	"Ho Bas Qayamat Ho Gayi"	Usha Khanna	S. H. Bihari	solo
Haye Mera Dil	329	"Ijaazat Ho To Main Kuchh"	Usha Khanna	S. H. Bihari	solo
Maa	330	"Main Hansoon Ke Is Pe Roun"	Chitragupta	Majrooh Sultanpuri	solo
Maa	331	"Yaaron Manao Jashn"	Chitragupta	Majrooh Sultanpuri	solo
Maa	332	"Hum To Rahe Sada Kunware"	Chitragupta	Majrooh Sultanpuri	solo
Padosan	333	"Ek Chatur Naar"	R. D. Burman	Rajendra Krishan	Manna Dey
Padosan	334	"Kehna Hai Kehna Hai"	R. D. Burman	Rajendra Krishan	solo
Padosan	335	"Meri Pyari Bindu"	R. D. Burman	Rajendra Krishan	solo
Padosan	336	"Mere Saamnewali Khidki Mein"	R. D. Burman	Rajendra Krishan	solo
Payal Ki Jhankar	337	"Abba Kahe Na Amma"	C. Ramchandra	Rajendra Krishan	solo
Payal Ki Jhankar	338	"Aye Mere Soye Huye Pyaar"	C. Ramchandra	Rajendra Krishan	solo
Payal Ki Jhankar	339	"Mukhde Pe Gesu"	C. Ramchandra	Qamar Jalalabadi	solo
Ramdoot Hanumaan	340	"Jhamak Jhamak Jhaar"	Dakshina Mohan Tagore	Bharat Vyas	solo
Shrimanji	341	"Arre Bhai Shrimanji"	O. P. Nayyar	Aziz Kashmiri	Mahendra Kapoor
Shrimanji	342	"Kaati Umar Hotelon Mein"	O. P. Nayyar	Aziz Kashmiri	Mahendra Kapoor
Shrimanji	343	"Is Duniya Mein Pyare"	O. P. Nayyar	Aziz Kashmiri	solo
Shrimanji	344	"Pehlu Mein Yaar Ho To"	O. P. Nayyar	Aziz Kashmiri	Asha Bhosle
Suhaag Raat	345	"Are Oh Re"	Kalyanji-Anandji	Indeevar	solo
Teen Bahuraniyan	346	"Aa Sapnon Ki Rani"	Kalyanji-Anandji	Anand Bakshi	Asha Bhosle

==== 1969 ====
Film	No.	Song	Composer(s)	Writer(s)	Co-artist(s)
Aansoo Ban Gaye Phool	347	"Ab Chahe Kisi Se Pyaar Karo"	Laxmikant-Pyarelal	Taj Bhopali	solo
Aansoo Ban Gaye Phool	348	"Yeh Dil Sada Dhadka"	Laxmikant-Pyarelal	Taj Bhopali	solo
Aansoo Ban Gaye Phool	349	"Jaane Kaisa Hai Mera Deewana"	Laxmikant-Pyarelal	Govind Moonis	Asha Bhosle
Aradhana	350	"Roop Tera Mastana"	S. D. Burman	Anand Bakshi	solo
Aradhana	351	"Mere Sapno Ki Rani"	S. D. Burman	Anand Bakshi	solo
Aradhana	352	"Kora Kagaz Tha Yeh Mann Mera"	S. D. Burman	Anand Bakshi	Lata Mangeshkar
Bhai Bahen	353	"Aa Zara Aaj To Muskura Le"	Shankar-Jaikishan	S. H. Bihari	Manna Dey
Do Raaste	354	"Mere Naseeb Mein Ae Dost"	Laxmikant-Pyarelal	Anand Bakshi	solo
Jyoti	355	"Aankh Mere Galti Se"	S. D. Burman	Anand Bakshi	solo
Khamoshi	356	"Woh Shaam Kuchh Ajeeb Thi"	Hemant Kumar	Gulzar	solo
Mahal	357	"Aankhon Aankhon Mein"	Kalyanji-Anandji	Anand Bakshi	Asha Bhosle
Mahal	358	"Yeh Duniyawale Poochhenge"	Kalyanji-Anandji	Anand Bakshi	Asha Bhosle
Mahal	359	"O Tera Naam Leke"	Kalyanji-Anandji	Anand Bakshi	solo
Nanha Farishta	360	"Bachche Mein Hai Bhagwan"	Kalyanji-Anandji	Sahir Ludhianvi	Mohammad Rafi, Manna Dey
Paisa Ya Pyaar	361	"Tu Bhi Number Ek Hai"	Ravi	Sahir Ludhianvi	Asha Bhosle
Pyar Ka Mausam	362	"Tum Bin Jaoon Kahan"	R. D. Burman	Majrooh Sultanpuri	solo
Rahgir	363	"Baid Ke Palle Pade"	Hemant Kumar	Gulzar	solo
Rahgir	364	"Babu Ghabrate Hai"	Hemant Kumar	Gulzar	Asha Bhosle
Satyakam	365	"Zindagi Hai Kya Bolo"	Laxmikant-Pyarelal	Kaifi Azmi	Mukesh, Manna Dey

=== 1970s ===
==== 1970 ====
Film	No.	Song	Composer(s)	Writer(s)	Co-artist(s)
Aan Milo Sajna	366	"Achcha To Hum Chalte Hain"	Laxmikant-Pyarelal	Anand Bakshi	Lata Mangeshkar
Aan Milo Sajna	367	"Jawani O Diwani"	Laxmikant-Pyarelal	Anand Bakshi	solo
Aansoo Aur Muskaan	368	"Guni Janon Bhakt Janon"	Kalyanji-Anandji	Qamar Jalalabadi	solo
Abhinetri	369	"Sa Re Ga Ma Pa"	Laxmikant-Pyarelal	Majrooh Sultanpuri	Lata Mangeshkar
Bachpan	370	"Ari Muniya Re"	Laxmikant-Pyarelal	Anand Bakshi	solo
Bombay Talkie	371	"Typewriter Tip Tip Tip"	Shankar-Jaikishan	Hasrat Jaipuri	Asha Bhosle
Darpan	372	"Jal Gayi Jal Gayi"	Laxmikant-Pyarelal	Anand Bakshi	Asha Bhosle
Darpan	373	"Bujha Do Deepak"	Laxmikant-Pyarelal	Anand Bakshi	solo
Deedar	374	"Jee Bhar Ke Dekh Lo"	Usha Khanna	Verma Malik	solo
Deedar	375	"Peene Se Pilane Se"	Usha Khanna	Verma Malik	solo
Ehsan	376	"Aaja Tujhe Pyaar Kar Loon"	R. D. Burman	Majrooh Sultanpuri	Asha Bhosle
Ghar Ghar Ki Kahani	377	"Sama Hai Suhana"	Kalyanji-Anandji	Hasrat Jaipuri	solo
Hamara Adhikar	378	"Bum Pum"	Chitragupta	Kaifi Azmi	Asha Bhosle
Holi Ayee Re	379	"Meri Lottery Lag Jane Wali Hai"	Kalyanji-Anandji	Qamar Jalalabadi	solo
Humjoli	380	"Chal Shuru Ho Jaa"	Laxmikant-Pyarelal	Anand Bakshi	Mohammed Rafi
Humjoli	381	"Yeh Kaisa Aaya Zamana"	Laxmikant-Pyarelal	Anand Bakshi	Mukesh; Mehmood
Jawab	382	"Aaja Meri Jaan"	Laxmikant-Pyarelal	Rajendra Krishan	Asha Bhosle
Johnny Mera Naam	383	"Pal Bhar Ke Liye"	Kalyanji-Anandji	Indeevar	solo
Johnny Mera Naam	384	"Nafrat Karne Walon Ke"	Kalyanji-Anandji	Indeevar	solo
Johnny Mera Naam	385	"O Mere Raja"	Kalyanji-Anandji	Indeevar	Asha Bhosle
Kati Patang	386	"Yeh Shaam Mastani	R. D. Burman	Anand Bakshi	solo
Kati Patang	387	"Yeh Jo Mohabbat Hai"	R. D. Burman	Anand Bakshi	solo
Kati Patang	388	"Pyaar Deewana Hota Hain"	R. D. Burman	Anand Bakshi	solo
Kati Patang	389	"Aaj Na Chhodenge"	R. D. Burman	Anand Bakshi	Lata Mangeshkar
Khilona	390	"Roz Roz Rosie"	Laxmikant-Pyarelal	Anand Bakshi	Asha Bhosle
Mastana	391	"Jab Jab Hum Tumko"	Laxmikant-Pyarelal	Anand Bakshi	Lata Mangeshkar
Mastana	392	"Jaagi Jaa Tara"	Laxmikant-Pyarelal	Anand Bakshi	solo
Mastana	393	"Soi Jaa Tara"	Laxmikant-Pyarelal	Anand Bakshi	Hemlata
N/A	394	"Ek Din Dil Ki Mehfil Mein"	Laxmikant-Pyarelal	Anand Bakshi	solo
Pavitra Paapi	395	"Teri Duniya Se Hoke Majboor"	Prem Dhawan	Prem Dhawan	solo
Prem Pujari	396	"Shokhiyon Mein Ghola Jaye"	S. D. Burman	Neeraj	Lata Mangeshkar
Prem Pujari	397	"Phoolon Ke Rang Se"	S. D. Burman	Neeraj	solo
Prem Pujari	398	"Yaaron Nilam Karo Susti"	S. D. Burman	Neeraj	Bhupinder Singh
Prem Pujari	399	"Shokhiyon Mein Ghola Jaye (Revival)"	S. D. Burman	Neeraj	Lata Mangeshkar
Prem Pujari	400	"Phoolon Ke Rang Se (Revival)"	S. D. Burman	Neeraj	Solo
Rootha Na Karo	401	"Tum Bhi Khubsoorat"	C. Ramchandra	Hasrat Jaipuri	solo
Rootha Na Karo	402	"Rootha Na Karo"	C. Ramchandra	Hasrat Jaipuri	solo
Saas Bhi Kabhi Bahu Thi	403	"Ek Botal Ho"	R. D. Burman	Rajendra Krishan	solo
Saas Bhi Kabhi Bahu Thi	404	"Le Lo Chudiyan"	R. D. Burman	Rajendra Krishan	Lata Mangeshkar
Saas Bhi Kabhi Bahu Thi	405	"Suno Ji Tum"	R. D. Burman	Rajendra Krishan	Suman Kalyanpur
Sachaa Jhutha	406	"Dil Sachcha"	Kalyanji-Anandji	Indeevar	solo
Sachaa Jhutha	407	"Meri Pyari Behaniya" (part 1)	Kalyanji-Anandji	Indeevar	solo
Sachaa Jhutha	408	"Meri Pyari Behaniya" (part 2)	Kalyanji-Anandji	Indeevar	solo
Sachaa Jhutha	409	"O Kehdo Kehdo Haan Tum Jo Kehdo"	Kalyanji-Anandji	Indeevar	Lata Mangeshkar
Safar	410	"Jeevan Se Bhari Teri Aankhen"	Kalyanji-Anandji	Indeevar	solo
Safar	411	"Zindagi Ka Safar"	Kalyanji-Anandji	Indeevar	solo
Tum Haseen Main Jawaan	412	"Munne Ki Amma"	Shankar-Jaikishan	Rajendra Krishan	Pankaj Udhas
Umang	413	"Aa Jaa Pyare"	Shankar-Jaikishan	S. H. Bihari	Mahendra Kapoor
Umang	414	"Pyaar Pe Koi Bas To Nahin"	Shankar-Jaikishan	S. H. Bihari	solo
Umang	415	"Hum Log Hai Aise"	Shankar-Jaikishan	S. H. Bihari	solo
Umang	416	"Sachcha Pyaar To Jhuk Nahi Sakta"	Shankar-Jaikishan	S. H. Bihari	Asha Bhosle

==== 1971 ====
Film	No.	Song	Composer(s)	Writer(s)	Co-artist(s)
Aap Aye Bahaar Ayee	417	"Tumko Bhi To Aisa"	Laxmikant-Pyarelal	Anand Bakshi	Lata Mangeshkar
Adhikar	418	"Koi Maane Ya Na Maane"	R. D. Burman	Ramesh Pant	Asha Bhosle
Aisa Bhi Hota Hai	419	"O Meri Gori"	O. P. Nayyar	S. H. Bihari	solo
Albela	420	"Main Hoon Albela"	Shankar-Jaikishan	Hasrat Jaipuri	solo
Albela	421	"Ae Mere Dil Mat Kar" (part 1)	Shankar-Jaikishan	Hasrat Jaipuri	solo
Albela	422	"Ae Mere Dil Mat Kar" (part 2)	Shankar-Jaikishan	Hasrat Jaipuri	solo
Andaz	423	"Zindagi Ek Safar Hai"	Shankar-Jaikishan	Hasrat Jaipuri	solo
Banphool	424	"Main Jahan Chala Jaoon"	Laxmikant-Pyarelal	Anand Bakshi	solo
Banphool	425	"Taara Tera Mera Nahin"	Laxmikant-Pyarelal	Anand Bakshi	Lata Mangeshkar
Buddha Mil Gaya	426	"Raat Kali Ek Khwaab Mein Aayi"	R. D. Burman	Majrooh Sultanpuri	solo
Buddha Mil Gaya	427	"Bhali Bhali Si Ek Surat"	R. D. Burman	Majrooh Sultanpuri	Asha Bhosle
Caravan	428	"Hum Toh Hai Raahi"	R. D. Burman	Majrooh Sultanpuri	solo
Chhoti Bahu	429	"He Re Kanhaiya"	Kalyanji-Anandji	Indeevar	solo
Door Ka Raahi	430	"Bekaraar Dil Tu Gaaye Jaa" (duet)	Kishore Kumar	Irshad	Sulakshana Pandit
Door Ka Raahi	431	"Bekaraar Dil Tu Gaaye Jaa" (solo)	Kishore Kumar	Irshad	solo
Door Ka Raahi	432	"Jeevan Se Na Haar"	Kishore Kumar	Irshad	solo
Door Ka Raahi	433	"Khushi Do Ghadi Ki"	Kishore Kumar	Irshad	solo
Door Ka Raahi	434	"Mujhe Kho Jaane Do"	Kishore Kumar	Irshad	solo
Door Ka Raahi	435	"Panthi Hoon Main"	Kishore Kumar	Irshad	solo
Duniya Kya Jaane	436	"Saanjh Savere Nain Tere Mere"	Shankar-Jaikishan	Rajendra Krishan	Asha Bhosle
Duniya Kya Jaane	437	"Jhoom Jhoom Naach Uthi"	Shankar-Jaikishan	Rajendra Krishan	solo
Ek Nari Ek Brahmachari	438	"Lapa Losa Nanapa"	Shankar-Jaikishan	Hasrat Jaipuri	Asha Bhosle
Ek Nari Ek Brahmachari	439	"Yeh Pyaar To Milan Hai"	Shankar-Jaikishan	Hasrat Jaipuri	solo
Ek Nari Ek Brahmachari	440	"Are Tu Hai Buddhu Brahmachari"	Shankar-Jaikishan	Neeraj	Asha Bhosle, Manna Dey, Sharda
Gambler	441	"Apne Honthon Ki Bansi"	S. D. Burman	Neeraj	Lata Mangeshkar
Gambler	442	"Choodi Nahin Ye Mera Dil"	S. D. Burman	Neeraj	Lata Mangeshkar
Gambler	443	"Dil Aaj Shayar Hai"	S. D. Burman	Neeraj	solo
Gambler	444	"Kaisa Hai Mere Dil Tu Khiladi"	S. D. Burman	Neeraj	solo
Haathi Mere Saathi	445	"Chal Chal Chal Mere Saathi"	Laxmikant-Pyarelal	Anand Bakshi	solo
Haathi Mere Saathi	446	"Duniya Me Rehna Hai To Kaam Kar Pyare"	Laxmikant-Pyarelal	Anand Bakshi	solo
Haathi Mere Saathi	447	"Dhak Dhak Kaise Chalti Hai Gaadi"	Laxmikant-Pyarelal	Anand Bakshi	Lata Mangeshkar
Haathi Mere Saathi	448	"Sunja Aa Thandi Hawa"	Laxmikant-Pyarelal	Anand Bakshi	Lata Mangeshkar
Haathi Mere Saathi	449	"Dilbar Jani Chali Hawa Mastani"	Laxmikant-Pyarelal	Anand Bakshi	Lata Mangeshkar
Hare Rama Hare Krishna	450	"Dekho O Diwano"	R. D. Burman	Anand Bakshi	solo
Hare Rama Hare Krishna	451	"Phoolon Ka Taaron Ka" (male)	R. D. Burman	Anand Bakshi	solo
Hare Rama Hare Krishna	452	"Kanchi Re"	R. D. Burman	Anand Bakshi	Lata Mangeshkar
Hare Rama Hare Krishna	453	"Kanchi Re" (revival)	R. D. Burman	Anand Bakshi	Lata Mangeshkar
Hum Tum Aur Woh	454	"Do Baaton Ki Mujhko Tamanna"	Kalyanji-Anandji	Verma Malik	Asha Bhosle
Hum Tum Aur Woh	455	"Priye Praneshwari"	Kalyanji-Anandji	Verma Malik	Solo
Hungama	456	"Ae Door Se Baat Karna Ri"	R. D. Burman	Anjaan	Asha Bhosle
Jai Bangladesh	457	"Masjid Mein Main Hi Dukha"	Kalyanji-Anandji	Indeevar	solo
Jaane-Anjaane	458	"Jane Anjane Log Mile"	Shankar-Jaikishan	Hasrat Jaipuri	solo
Kahin Aar Kahin Paar	459	"Jawani Ka Yeh Alam"	Ganesh	S. H. Bihari	solo
Kal Aaj Aur Kal	460	"Tick Tick Tick Chalti Jaye Ghadi"	Shankar-Jaikishan	Neeraj	Mukesh, Asha Bhosle
Kal Aaj Aur Kal	461	"Aap Yahan Aaye Kisliye"	Shankar-Jaikishan	Neeraj	Asha Bhosle
Kal Aaj Aur Kal	462	"Hum Jab Honge Saath Saal Ke"	Shankar-Jaikishan	Shaily Shailendra	Asha Bhosle
Kal Aaj Aur Kal	463	"Bhanware Ki Gunjan"	Shankar-Jaikishan	Hasrat Jaipuri	solo
Kathputli	464	"Jo Tum Hansoge"	Kalyanji-Anandji	Verma Malik	solo
Kathputli	465	"Likha Hai Likha Hai"	Kalyanji-Anandji	Verma Malik	Asha Bhosle
Khoj	466	"Halka Halka Sa Rang"	Usha Khanna	Mahendra Dalvi	Mohammad Rafi
Khoj	467	"Ruk Jaa O Albeli"	Usha Khanna	Asad Bhopali	solo
Lakhon Mein Ek	468	"Chanda O Chanda (Male)"	R. D. Burman	Anand Bakshi	solo
Lakhon Mein Ek	469	"Jogi O Jogi"	R. D. Burman	Anand Bakshi	Lata Mangeshkar
Lal Patthar	470	"Geet Gaata Hoon"	Shankar-Jaikishan	Dev Kohli	solo
Main Sunder Hoon	471	"Do Mastane Do Deewane"	Shankar-Jaikishan	Anand Bakshi	Asha Bhosle
Main Sunder Hoon	472	"Mujhko Thand Pag Rahi Hai"	Shankar-Jaikishan	Anand Bakshi	Asha Bhosle
Main Sunder Hoon	473	"Nach Meri Jaan"	Shankar-Jaikishan	Anand Bakshi	Asha Bhosle
Man Mandir	474	"Aa Aaja Abhi"	Laxmikant-Pyarelal	Rajendra Krishan	Asha Bhosle
Man Mandir	475	"Jadugar Tere Naina"	Laxmikant-Pyarelal	Rajendra Krishan	Lata Mangeshkar
Maryada	476	"O Ladki Deewani Sun"	Kalyanji-Anandji	Anand Bakshi	solo
Maryada	477	"Gussa Itna Haseen"	Kalyanji-Anandji	Anand Bakshi	solo
Maryada	478	"Chupke Se Dil De De"	Kalyanji-Anandji	Anand Bakshi	Lata Mangeshkar
Mehboob Ki Mehndi	479	"Mere Deewanepan Ki"	Laxmikant-Pyarelal	Anand Bakshi	solo
Mere Apne	480	"Halchal Thikthak Hai"	Salil Chowdhury	Gulzar	Mukesh
Mere Apne	481	"Koi Hota Jisko Apna"	Salil Chowdhury	Gulzar	solo
Naya Zamana	482	"Duniya O Duniya"	S. D. Burman	Anand Bakshi	solo
Naya Zamana	483	"Waah Re Naujawan"	S. D. Burman	Anand Bakshi	solo
Paras	484	"Gali Gali Aur Gaon Gaon"	Kalyanji-Anandji	Verma Malik	solo
Paraya Dhan	485	"Aaj Unse Pehli Mulaqat"	R. D. Burman	Anand Bakshi	solo
Paraya Dhan	486	"Dil Haye Mera Dil"	R. D. Burman	Anand Bakshi	solo
Paraya Dhan	487	"Tera Mera Juda Hona Mushkil Hai"	R. D. Burman	Anand Bakshi	Lata Mangeshkar
Paraya Dhan	488	"Aao Jhoome Gaayen"	R. D. Burman	Anand Bakshi	Asha Bhosle
Parde ke Peechey	489	"Soorat Se Kya Pehchanoge"	Shankar-Jaikishan	Rajendra Krishan	solo
Parde ke Peechey	490	"Tum Jab Jab Saamne Aate Ho"	Shankar-Jaikishan	Rajendra Krishan	Lata Mangeshkar
Parwana	491	"Simti Si Sharmai Si"	Madan Mohan	Kaifi Azmi	solo
Parwana	492	"Yun Na Sharma"	Madan Mohan	Kaifi Azmi	Mohammed Rafi
Preet Ki Dori	493	"Mila Jo Pyaar Toh"	Kalyanji-Anandji	Indeevar	solo
Pyar Ki Kahani	494	"Gori Ho Gori"	R. D. Burman	Anand Bakshi	solo
Pyar Ki Kahani	495	"Ek Khabar Aayi Suno"	R. D. Burman	Anand Bakshi	Lata Mangeshkar
Saaz Aur Sanam	496	"Dil Se Nazar Tak"	Chitragupta	Kaifi Azmi	solo
Saaz Aur Sanam	497	"Yeh Meri Bala Jaane"	Chitragupta	Kaifi Azmi	solo
Sanjog	498	"Roop Yeh Tera Jisne Banaya"	S. D. Burman	Anand Bakshi	solo
Sanjog	499	"Ek Do Teen Char"	S. D. Burman	Anand Bakshi	solo
Sansar	500	"Tamasha Dekho Zamana"	Chitragupta	Sahir Ludhianvi	solo
Sansar	501	"Haathon Mein Kitaab"	Chitragupta	Sahir Ludhianvi	solo
Sansar	502	"Mile Jitni Sharaab"	Chitragupta	Sahir Ludhianvi	solo
Sansar	503	"Bas Ab Tarana Chhodo"	Chitragupta	Sahir Ludhianvi	Asha Bhosle
Seema	504	"Waqt Thoda Sa Abhi"	Shankar-Jaikishan	Indeevar	Asha Bhosle
Seema	505	"Dil Mera Kho Gaya"	Shankar-Jaikishan	Verma Malik	Asha Bhosle
Seema	506	"Ladki Chale Jab Sadkon Pe"	Shankar-Jaikishan	Verma Malik	solo
Sharmilee	507	"Aaj Madhosh Hua Jaye"	S. D. Burman	Neeraj	Lata Mangeshkar
Sharmilee	508	"Kaise Kahen Hum"	S. D. Burman	Neeraj	solo
Sharmilee	509	"Khilte Hain Gul Yahan"	S. D. Burman	Neeraj	solo
Sharmilee	510	"O Meri Sharmilee"	S. D. Burman	Neeraj	solo
Tere Mere Sapne	511	"Hai Maine Kasam Li"	S. D. Burman	Neeraj	Lata Mangeshkar
Tere Mere Sapne	512	"Jeevan Ke Bagiya Mehkegi"	S. D. Burman	Neeraj	Lata Mangeshkar
Woh Din Yaad Karo	513	"Aasman Se Tod Ke Tare"	Laxmikant-Pyarelal	Anand Bakshi	Sulakshana Pandit

==== 1972 ====
Film	No.	Song	Composer(s)	Writer(s)	Co-artist(s)
Aankh Micholi	514	"Kehta Hai Dil Mastana"	Shankar Jaikishan	Rajendra Krishan	solo
Aankh Micholi	515	"Tere Mere Pyar Ki"	Shankar Jaikishan	Rajendra Krishan	Lata Mangeshkar
Aankh Micholi	516	"Aa Jaa Re Aa Jaa"	Shankar Jaikishan	Rajendra Krishan	Asha Bhosle
Aankhon Aankhon Mein	517	"Aankhon Aankhon Mein Baat Hone Do"	Shankar Jaikishan	Verma Malik	Asha Bhosle
Aankhon Aankhon Mein	518	"Tera Mera Mel Hai"	Shankar Jaikishan	Verma Malik	Asha Bhosle
Aankhon Aankhon Mein	519	"Do Baaten Pyaar Bhari"	Shankar Jaikishan	Verma Malik	Asha Bhosle
Aankhon Aankhon Mein	520	"Teri Umar Naadan"	Shankar Jaikishan	Verma Malik	solo
Amar Prem	521	"Kuch Toh Log Kahenge"	R. D. Burman	Anand Bakshi	solo
Amar Prem	522	"Chingari Koi Bhadke"	R. D. Burman	Anand Bakshi	solo
Amar Prem	523	"Yeh Kya Hua"	R. D. Burman	Anand Bakshi	solo
Annadata	524	"O Meri Pran Sajni"	Salil Chowdhury	Yogesh	solo
Annadata	525	"Guzar Jaaye Din"	Salil Chowdhury	Yogesh	solo
Anokha Daan	526	"Humrahi Anokhe Manzil Ke"	Salil Chowdhury	Yogesh	solo
Anokha Daan	527	"Aayi Ghir Ghir Sawan"	Salil Chowdhury	Yogesh	solo
Anuraag	528	"Ram Kare Babua"	S. D. Burman	Anand Bakshi	solo
Apna Desh	529	"Kajra Laga Je"	R. D. Burman	Anand Bakshi	Lata Mangeshkar
Apna Desh	530	"Sun Champa Sun Tara"	R. D. Burman	Anand Bakshi	Lata Mangeshkar
Apna Desh	531	"Ro Naa Kabhi Nahin"	R. D. Burman	Anand Bakshi	solo
Apradh	532	"Tum Ho Hasin Wafa"	Kalyanji-Anandji	Indeevar	solo
Apradh	533	"Humare Siva Tumhare Aur Kitne Deewane Hai"	Kalyanji-Anandji	Indeevar	Lata Mangeshkar
Apradh	534	"Tum Mile Pyaar Se"	Kalyanji-Anandji	Indeevar	Asha Bhosle
Babul Ki Galiyan	535	"Ek Cheez Maangte Hain Hum"	Ravi	Rajendra Krishan	Asha Bhosle
Bandagi	536	"Yeh Tooti Botal Ke"	Shankar-Jaikishan	Rajendra Krishan	solo
Bandagi	537	"Mera Yaar Zulf Mein"	Shankar-Jaikishan	Rajendra Krishan	solo
Bandagi	538	"Allah Kasam Ik Tum"	Shankar-Jaikishan	Rajendra Krishan	solo
Bandagi	539	"Phoolon Ki Taazgi"	Shankar-Jaikishan	Rajendra Krishan	Asha Bhosle
Bawarchi	540	"Bhor Aayi Gayi Andhiyara"	Madan Mohan	Kaifi Azmi, Gulzar, Hridaynath Chattopadhyay	Manna Dey, Nirmala Devi, Hridaynath Chattopadhyay, Lakshmi Shankar
Be-Imaan	541	"Hum Do Mast Malang"	Shankar-Jaikishan	Verma Malik	Mahendra Kapoor
Bees Saal Pehle	542	"Hai Zamana Mere Dil"	Hemant Kumar	S. H. Bihari	solo
Bees Saal Pehle	543	"Abhi To Dua Deke"	Hemant Kumar	S. H. Bihari	Asha Bhosle
Bhai Ho To Aisa	544	"Bol Meri Gudiya"	Sonik-Omi	Sahir Ludhianvi	Lata Mangeshkar
Bombay to Goa	545	"Dekha Na Haye Re"	R. D. Burman	Rajendra Krishan	solo
Bombay to Goa	546	"Yeh Mehki Mehki Thandi Hawa"	R. D. Burman	Rajendra Krishan	solo
Bombay to Goa	547	"Tum Meri Zindagi Mein"	R. D. Burman	Rajendra Krishan	Lata Mangeshkar
Bombay to Goa	548	"Dil Tera Hai Main Bhi Teri"	R. D. Burman	Rajendra Krishan	Lata Mangeshkar
Buniyad	549	"Main Hoon Kismatwala"	Laxmikant-Pyarelal	Anand Bakshi	solo
Buniyad	550	"Pukaro Mujhe Phir Pukaro"	Laxmikant-Pyarelal	Anand Bakshi	Lata Mangeshkar
Dharkan	551	"Tumse Nazar Mili"	Ravi	Ravi, Prem Dhawan, Ali Jalili	Asha Bhosle, Ravi
Dharkan	552	"Maine Pehli Hi Baar Dekha"	Ravi	Prem Dhawan	Asha Bhosle
Dharkan	553	"Main To Chala Jidhar"	Ravi	Ravi, Prem Dhawan	solo
Dil Daulat Duniya	554	"Masti Aur Jawani Ho"	Shankar-Jaikishan	Verma Malik	Asha Bhosle, Sharda
Dil Daulat Duniya	555	"O Meri Lara Loo"	Shankar-Jaikishan	Verma Malik	Asha Bhosle
Dil Daulat Duniya	556	"Ruk Meri Rani"	Shankar-Jaikishan	Verma Malik	solo
Dil Daulat Duniya	557	"Saath Mein Pyara Saathi Hai"	Shankar-Jaikishan	Verma Malik	solo
Do Bachche Dus Haath	558	"Honth Gulabi Kurta Laal"	Sonik-Omi	Verma Malik	solo
Do Chor	559	"Kaali Palak Teri"	R. D. Burman	Majrooh Sultanpuri	Lata Mangeshkar
Do Chor	560	"Chahe Raho Dur"	R. D. Burman	Majrooh Sultanpuri	Lata Mangeshkar
Do Chor	561	"Meri Jaan Meri Jaan"	R. D. Burman	Majrooh Sultanpuri	solo
Doctor X	562	"Roop Ki Woh Taaksaal"	Sonik-Omi	Indeevar	solo
Dushmun	563	"Maine Dekha Tune Dekha"	Laxmikant-Pyarelal	Anand Bakshi	Lata Mangeshkar
Dushmun	564	"Vaada Tera Sadaa"	Laxmikant-Pyarelal	Anand Bakshi	solo
Ek Baar Muskura Do	565	"Roop Tera Aisa"	O. P. Nayyar	Indeevar	solo
Ek Baar Muskura Do	566	"Savere Ka Suraj Tumhare Liye"	O. P. Nayyar	Indeevar	solo
Ek Baar Muskura Do	567	"Tu Auron Ki Kyun Ho Gayi" (male)	O. P. Nayyar	Indeevar	solo
Ek Baar Muskura Do	568	"Tu Auron Ki Kyun Ho Gayi" (duet)	O. P. Nayyar	Indeevar	Asha Bhosle
Ek Baar Muskura Do	569	"Ek Baar Muskura Do"	O. P. Nayyar	Indeevar	Asha Bhosle
Ek Hasina Do Diwane	570	"Aaja Ya Aa Jaane De"	Kalyanji-Anandji	Anjaan	Asha Bhosle
Ek Nazar	571	"Pyaar Ko Chahiye Kya"	Laxmikant-Pyarelal	Majrooh Sultanpuri	solo
Gomti Ke Kinare	572	"Aao Aao Jaan-E-Jahan"	R. D. Burman	Majrooh Sultanpuri	Asha Bhosle
Gomti Ke Kinare	573	"Jeene Ka Din"	R. D. Burman	Majrooh Sultanpuri	Lata Mangeshkar
Haar Jeet	574	"Itne Din Tum Kahan Rahe"	Laxmikant-Pyarelal	Anand Bakshi	Asha Bhosle
Janwar Aur Insaan	575	"Jeevan Ek Path Hai"	Kalyanji-Anandji	Indeevar	Lata Mangeshkar
Janwar Aur Insaan	576	"Jaane Mujhe Kya Hua"	Kalyanji-Anandji	Gulshan Bawra	Lata Mangeshkar
Janwar Aur Insaan	577	"Mujhe Aisi Mili Hasina"	Kalyanji-Anandji	Indeevar	solo
Jangal Mein Mangal	578	"Tum Kitni Khubsoorat Ho"	Shankar-Jaikishan	Hasrat Jaipuri, Neeraj	solo
Jangal Mein Mangal	579	"Kal Ki Na Karo Baat"	Shankar-Jaikishan	Hasrat Jaipuri, Neeraj	solo
Jangal Mein Mangal	580	"Ae Bagh Ki Kaliyon"	Shankar-Jaikishan	Hasrat Jaipuri, Neeraj	Mohammed Rafi
Jawani Diwani	581	"Agar Saaz Chheda"	R. D. Burman	Anand Bakshi	Asha Bhosle
Jawani Diwani	582	"Jaane Jaan Dhoodhta Phir Raha"	R. D. Burman	Anand Bakshi	Asha Bhosle
Jawani Diwani	583	"Nahin Nahin, Abhi Nahin"	R. D. Burman	Anand Bakshi	Asha Bhosle
Jawani Diwani	584	"Yeh Jawaani Hai Deewani"	R. D. Burman	Anand Bakshi	solo
Jawani Diwani	585	"Saamne Yeh Kaun Aaya"	R. D. Burman	Anand Bakshi	solo
Joroo Ka Ghulam	586	"Baras Gayi Re"	Kalyanji-Anandji	Anand Bakshi	solo
Joroo Ka Ghulam	587	"Aaiye Aapko Main"	Kalyanji-Anandji	Anand Bakshi	solo
Joroo Ka Ghulam	588	"Nainon Mein Nindiya Hai"	Kalyanji-Anandji	Anand Bakshi	Lata Mangeshkar
Joroo Ka Ghulam	589	"Hum Do Mohabbatwale"	Kalyanji-Anandji	Anand Bakshi	Asha Bhosle
Maalik	590	"Khana Milega Peena Milega"	Kalyanji-Anandji	Rajendra Krishan	solo
Maanavata	591	"Tu Pyaar Pe Mere"	Kalyanji-Anandji	Indeevar	solo
Maanavata	592	"Tere Vishal Hriday Ne Payi"	Kalyanji-Anandji	Indeevar	solo
Maanavata	593	"Mast Jawani Phir Nahin Aani"	Kalyanji-Anandji	Gulshan Bawra	solo
Man Jaiye	594	"Yeh Wohi Geet Hai"	Jaidev	Naqsh Lyallpuri	solo
Mere Jeevan Saathi	595	"Kitne Sapne Kitne Arman"	R. D. Burman	Majrooh Sultanpuri	solo
Mere Jeevan Saathi	596	"Aao Kanhai Mere Dhaam"	R. D. Burman	Majrooh Sultanpuri	solo
Mere Jeevan Saathi	597	"Chala Jaata Hoon"	R. D. Burman	Majrooh Sultanpuri	solo
Mere Jeevan Saathi	598	"Deewana Leke Aaya Hai"	R. D. Burman	Majrooh Sultanpuri	solo
Mere Jeevan Saathi	599	"O Mere Dil Ke Chain"	R. D. Burman	Majrooh Sultanpuri	solo
Mere Jeevan Saathi	600	"Deewana Karke Chhodoge"	R. D. Burman	Majrooh Sultanpuri	Lata Mangeshkar
Munimji	601	"Sonkali Hai Tu"	Usha Khanna	Neeraj, Hasrat Jaipuri	solo
Naag Panchami	602	"Bharat Ke Naari Hai Tu"	Ravi	Indeevar	solo
Naag Panchami	"Bharat Ke Naari Hai Tu" (version 2)		Ravi	Indeevar	solo
Naag Panchami	603	"Main Nadiya Ki Dhaara"	Ravi	Indeevar	Lata Mangeshkar
Nagina	604	"Yere Mere Pyaar Ka"	Shankar-Jaikishan	Hasrat Jaipuri	Asha Bhosle
Parchhaiyan	605	"Khuli Khuli Zulfen"	R. D. Burman	Majrooh Sultanpuri	solo
Parchhaiyan	606	"Hans Ke Pukaar"	R. D. Burman	Majrooh Sultanpuri	Lata Mangeshkar
Parichay	607	"Musafir Hoon Yaaron"	R. D. Burman	Gulzar	solo
Parichay	608	"Musafir Hoon Yaaron" (Part 2)	R. D. Burman	Gulzar	solo
Parichay	609	"Saare Ke Saare Gama Ko"	R. D. Burman	Gulzar	Asha Bhosle
Parivartan	610	"Rootho Na Sarkar	M. K. Pujari	Nawal	solo
Piya Ka Ghar	611	"Bambai Shahar Ki"	R. D. Burman	Anand Bakshi	solo
Piya Ka Ghar	612	"Yeh Jeevan Hai"	R. D. Burman	Anand Bakshi	solo
Putlibai	613	"Maine Saara Zamana Chhod Dia"	Jaikumar Paarte	Anjaan	solo
Putlibai	614	"Mere Meet Bata"	Jaikumar Paarte	Anjaan	Asha Bhosle
Pyar Diwana	615	"Kisko Chahun Kisko Na"	Lala Sattar	Asad Bhopali	solo
Pyar Diwana	616	"Aji Zara Rukiye"	Lala Sattar	Asad Bhopali	solo
Pyar Diwana	617	"Ab Main Jaoon"	Lala Sattar	Asad Bhopali	Asha Bhosle
Rampur Ka Lakshman	618	"Rampur Ka Baasi Hoon"	R. D. Burman	Majrooh Sultanpuri	solo
Rampur Ka Lakshman	619	"Kahe Apnon Ke" (male)	R. D. Burman	Majrooh Sultanpuri	solo
Rampur Ka Lakshman	620	"Kahe Apnon Ne" (duet)	R. D. Burman	Majrooh Sultanpuri	Asha Bhosle
Rampur Ka Lakshman	621	"Gum Hai Kisi Ke Pyaar Mein"	R. D. Burman	Majrooh Sultanpuri	Lata Mangeshkar
Rampur Ka Lakshman	622	"Pyar Ka Samay Kam Hai"	R. D. Burman	Majrooh Sultanpuri	Lata Mangeshkar, Mohammed Rafi
Raja Jani	623	"Jaani O Jaani"	Laxmikant-Pyarelal	Anand Bakshi	solo
Rakhi Aur Hathkadi	624	"Tum To Kya Ho Ji"	R. D. Burman	Majrooh Sultanpuri	Asha Bhosle
Rakhi Aur Hathkadi	625	"Achchi Nahin Sanam Dillagi"	R. D. Burman	Majrooh Sultanpuri	Asha Bhosle
Rivaaj	626	"Tujh Jaisi Ladki"	Shankar-Jaikishan	Hasrat Jaipuri	solo
Roop Tera Mastana	627	"Dil Ki Baaten Dil Hi Jaane"	Laxmikant-Pyarelal	Asad Bhopali	Lata Mangeshkar
Rut Rangeeli Ayee	628	"Ek Zara Sa Kam Karo"	Ratandeep-Hemraj	Tajdar Taaj	Asha Bhosle
Sa-Re-Ga-Ma-Pa	629	"Sanchi Kaho Moh Se Balma"	Ganesh	Majrooh Sultanpuri	Lata Mangeshkar
Samadhi	630	"Maine Dekha Ek Sapna"	R. D. Burman	Majrooh Sultanpuri	Lata Mangeshkar
Samadhi	631	"Jaan-E-Jaana Jaao"	R. D. Burman	Majrooh Sultanpuri	solo
Savera	632	"Ek Do Teen Char"	R. D. Burman	Majrooh Sultanpuri	Lata Mangeshkar
Seeta Aur Geeta	633	"Koi Ladki Mujhe Kal Raat"	R. D. Burman	Anand Bakshi	Lata Mangeshkar
Seeta Aur Geeta	634	"Hawa Ke Saath Saath"	R. D. Burman	Anand Bakshi	Asha Bhosle
Shehzada	635	"Rumjhim Rimjhim Dekho"	R. D. Burman	Rajendra Krishan	Lata Mangeshkar
Shehzada	636	"Na Jayo Na Jaiyo"	R. D. Burman	Rajendra Krishan	Lata Mangeshkar
Shehzada	637	"Thokar Mein Hai"	R. D. Burman	Rajendra Krishan	solo
Sub Ka Saathi	638	"Yeh Vaada Karo"	Kalyanji-Anandji	Rajendra Krishan	solo
Subah-O-Shaam	639	"Teri Meri Meri Teri Nazar"	Laxmikant-Pyarelal	Anand Bakshi	Asha Bhosle
Tanhaai	640	"Bheege Hue Anchal Mein"	Usha Khanna	Aman	solo
Victoria No. 203	641	"Tu Na Mili To"	Kalyanji-Anandji	Indeevar	solo
Victoria No. 203	642	"Dekha Maine Dekha"	Kalyanji-Anandji	Verma Malik	solo
Victoria No. 203	643	"Do Bechare Bina Sahare"	Kalyanji-Anandji	Verma Malik	Mahendra Kapoor
Wafaa	644	"Kaahe Jogi Bulaye"	Laxmikant-Pyarelal	Rajendra Krishan	solo
Wafaa	645	"Aankhon Se Jo Yaar Pilaye"	Laxmikant-Pyarelal	Rajendra Krishan	solo
Wafaa	646	"Alu Ki Sabzi"	Laxmikant-Pyarelal	Rajendra Krishan	Lata Mangeshkar
Wafaa	647	"Azadi Azadi Hum Sab Mastane"	Laxmikant-Pyarelal	Rajendra Krishan	Asha Bhosle
Yeh Gulistan Hamara	648	"Gori Gori Gaon Ki"	S. D. Burman	Anand Bakshi	Lata Mangeshkar
Yeh Gulistan Hamara	649	"Hey Suno Meri Baat"	S. D. Burman	Anand Bakshi	solo
Zameen Aasman	650	"Aankhen Tumhari Do Jahan"	Kishore Kumar	Indeevar	solo
Zameen Aasman	651	"Bakhuda Khullam Khulla"	Kishore Kumar	Indeevar	solo
Zameen Aasman	652	"Hum Tum Chale"	Kishore Kumar	Anand Bakshi	Asha Bhosle
Zindagi Zindagi	653	"Teri Zaat Kya Hai"	S. D. Burman	Anand Bakshi	solo
Zindagi Zindagi	654	"Tune Humen Kya Diya"	S. D. Burman	Anand Bakshi	solo
Zindagi Zindagi	655	"Khush Raho Saathiyon"	S. D. Burman	Anand Bakshi	Lata Mangeshkar

==== 1973 ====
Film	No.	Song	Composer(s)	Writer(s)	Co-artist(s)
Aa Gale Lag Jaa	656	"Aa Mere Bete"	R. D. Burman	Sahir Ludhianvi	Poornima
Aa Gale Lag Jaa	657	"Tera Mujhse Hai Pehle Ka" (duet)	R. D. Burman	Sahir Ludhianvi	Poornima
Aa Gale Lag Jaa	658	"Tera Mujhse Hai Pehle Ka" (male)	R. D. Burman	Sahir Ludhianvi	solo
Aa Gale Lag Jaa	659	"Aa Mere Bete" (male)	R. D. Burman	Sahir Ludhianvi	solo
Aa Gale Lag Jaa	660	"Na Koi Dil Mein"	R. D. Burman	Sahir Ludhianvi	solo
Aa Gale Lag Jaa	661	"Waada Karo"	R. D. Burman	Sahir Ludhianvi	Lata Mangeshkar
Aaj Ki Taaza Khabar	662	"Mujhe Meri Biwi Se"	Shankar Jaikishan	Hasrat Jaipuri	solo
Aaj Ki Taaza Khabar	663	"Raat Hai Baat Hai"	Shankar Jaikishan	Hasrat Jaipuri	solo
Aaj Ki Taaza Khabar	664	"Ata Aayega Kai"	Shankar Jaikishan	Hasrat Jaipuri	Usha Mangeshkar
Abhimaan	665	"Meet Na Mila"	S. D. Burman	Majrooh Sultanpuri	solo
Abhimaan	666	"Tere Mere Milan Ki"	S. D. Burman	Majrooh Sultanpuri	Lata Mangeshkar
Abhimaan	667	"Tere Mere Milan Ki" (version 2)	S. D. Burman	Majrooh Sultanpuri	
Anamika	668	"Meri Bheegi Bheegi Si" (based on Mone Pore Ruby Roy)	R. D. Burman	Majrooh Sultanpuri	solo
Anhonee	669	"Main Toh Ek Paagal"	Laxmikant-Pyarelal	Verma Malik	Asha Bhosle
Anokhi Ada	670	"Sundari Aay Haay"	Laxmikant-Pyarelal	Anand Bakshi	solo
Anokhi Ada	671	"Haal Kya Hai Dilon Ka"	Laxmikant-Pyarelal	Anand Bakshi	solo
Bada Kabutar	672	"Haye Re Haye Re"	R D Burman	Yogesh	Asha Bhosle
Banarasi Babu	673	"Hamara Naam Banarasi Babu"	Kalyanji-Anandji	Rajendra Krishan	solo
Banarasi Babu	674	"Mere Peechhe Ek Ladki"	Kalyanji-Anandji	Rajendra Krishan	solo
Banarasi Babu	675	"Aap Yahan Se Jaane Ka"	Kalyanji-Anandji	Rajendra Krishan	Asha Bhosle
Bandhe Haath	676	"Dekho Yeh Mere Bandhe Hath"	R D Burman	Majrooh Sultanpuri	solo
Blackmail	677	"Main Doob Doob Jaata Hoon"	Kalyanji-Anandji	Rajendra Krishan	solo
Blackmail	678	"Pal Pal Dil Ke Paas"	Kalyanji-Anandji	Rajendra Krishan	solo
Blackmail	679	"Mile Mile Do Badan"	Kalyanji-Anandji	Rajendra Krishan	Lata Mangeshkar
Chaalak	680	"Piye Jaa Jiye Jaa"	Ganesh	Hasrat Jaipuri	Asha Bhosle
Chaalak	681	"Dil Ka Nazrana Le"	Ganesh	Hasrat Jaipuri	Asha Bhosle
Chhalia	682	"O Jaane Man"	R. D. Burman	Rajendra Krishan	Asha Bhosle
Chhupa Rustam	683	"Jo Main Hota Ek Toota Tara"	S D Burman	Vijay Anand	Asha Bhosle
Chhupa Rustam	684	"Bolo Kya Humko Doge"	S D Burman	Vijay Anand	Asha Bhosle
Chhupa Rustam	685	"Dheere Se Jaana Bagiyan Mein"	S D Burman	Neeraj	solo
Daag	686	"Ab Chahe Maa Roothe Ya Baba"	Laxmikant-Pyarelal	Sahir Ludhianvi	Lata Mangeshkar
Daag	687	"Hum Aur Tum"	Laxmikant-Pyarelal	Sahir Ludhianvi	Lata Mangeshkar
Daag	688	"Mere Dil Mein Aaj Kya Hai"	Laxmikant-Pyarelal	Sahir Ludhianvi	solo
Dhamkee	689	"Kali Se Nazaaron Se"	Ganesh	Verma Malik	solo
Dhamkee	690	"Chand Kya Hai Roop Ka Darpan"	Ganesh	Asad Bhopali	Asha Bhosle
Do Phool	691	"Maaf Karo O Baba"	R. D. Burman	Majrooh Sultanpuri	Asha Bhosle, Usha Mangeshkar, Mehmood
Do Phool	692	"Maaf Karo O Baba" (Part 2)	R. D. Burman	Majrooh Sultanpuri	Asha Bhosle, Usha Mangeshkar, Mehmood
Double Cross	693	"Main Jhoka Mast Hawa Ka"	R. D. Burman	Majrooh Sultanpuri	solo
Double Cross	694	"Jeevan Bhar Ke Liye"	R. D. Burman	Majrooh Sultanpuri	Asha Bhosle
Double Cross	695	"Aiyo Aiyo Kahdo Zamane Se"	R. D. Burman	Majrooh Sultanpuri	Asha Bhosle
Double Cross	696	"Maine Tumko Chaha Pehli Baar"	R. D. Burman	Majrooh Sultanpuri	Asha Bhosle
Double Cross	697	"Dekho Hum Donon Ki Yaari"	R. D. Burman	Majrooh Sultanpuri	Bhupinder Singh
Ek Kunwari Ek Kunwara	698	"Pehli Baar Pehli Haar Hui"	Kalyanji-Anandji	Prakash Mehra	Asha Bhosle
Ek Mutthi Aasmaan	699	"Har Koi Chahta Hai Ek Mutthi Aasmaan"	Madan Mohan	Indeevar	solo
Ek Mutthi Aasmaan	700	"Har Koi Chahta Hai Ek Mutthi Aasmaan" (version 2)	Madan Mohan	Indeevar	solo
Ek Mutthi Aasmaan	701	"Har Koi Chahta Hai Ek Mutthi Aasmaan" (version 3)	Madan Mohan	Indeevar	solo
Ek Mutthi Aasmaan	702	"Har Koi Chahta Hai Ek Mutthi Aasmaan" (version 4)	Madan Mohan	Indeevar	solo
Ek Mutthi Aasmaan	703	"Pyaar Kabhi Kam Na Karna Sanam"	Madan Mohan	Indeevar	Vani Jairam
Ek Nari Do Roop	704	"Tum Samjho To Achcha Hai"	Ganesh	Naqsh Lyallpuri	Asha Bhosle
Gaai Aur Gori	705	"Gori O Gori Prem Karle"	Laxmikant-Pyarelal	Anand Bakshi	solo
Gehri Chaal	706	"Ae Bai Tu Kahan Se Aayi"	Laxmikant-Pyarelal	Rajendra Krishan	solo
Gehri Chaal	707	"Jaipur Ki Choli Mangwa De"	Laxmikant-Pyarelal	Rajendra Krishan	Asha Bhosle
Garibi Hatao	708	"Pyaari Beti Rani Beti"	Sharda	R. K. Middha	solo
Garibi Hatao	709	"Kabhi Khili Dil Ki Kali" (male)	Sharda	Qamar Jalalabadi	solo
Garibi Hatao	710	"Kabhi Khili Dil Ki Kali" (duet)	Sharda	Qamar Jalalabadi	Sharda
Ghulam Begam Badshah	711	"Raste Raste Janewali"	Kalyanji-Anandji	Rajendra Krishan	Asha Bhosle
Heera	712	"Ek Chhokariya Beech Bajariya"	Kalyanji-Anandji	Anjaan	Asha Bhosle, Usha Khanna, Mukri
Heera Panna	713	"Bahut Door Mujhe Chale Jaana Hai"	R D Burman	Anand Bakshi	Lata Mangeshkar
Heera Panna	714	"Panna Ki Tamanna"	R D Burman	Anand Bakshi	Lata Mangeshkar
Heera Panna	715	"Ek Paheli Hai Tu"	R D Burman	Anand Bakshi	Asha Bhosle
Heera Panna	716	"Main Tasveer Utarta Hoon"	R D Burman	Anand Bakshi	solo
Hifazat	717	"Jane Jahan Rootha Na Karo"	R D Burman	Majrooh Sultanpuri	solo
Honeymoon	718	"Do Dil Mile"	Usha Khanna	Yogesh	Asha Bhosle
Honeymoon	719	"Jeevan Hai Ek Sapna"	Usha Khanna	Yogesh	Asha Bhosle
Honeymoon	720	"Mere Pyase Man Ki Bahar"	Usha Khanna	Yogesh	Asha Bhosle
Insaaf	721	"Mem Shaab Mem Shaab"	Laxmikant-Pyarelal	Anand Bakshi	Lata Mangeshkar
Insaaf	722	"Dil Liya"	Laxmikant-Pyarelal	Anand Bakshi	Lata Mangeshkar
Intezar	723	"Aake Mil Jaa"	Chitragupta	Verma Malik	solo
Jaise Ko Taisa	724	"Chalte Chalte Peechhe Mudke"	R. D. Burman	Majrooh Sultanpuri	solo
Jaise Ko Taisa	725	"Jaise Ko Taisa Mila"	R. D. Burman	Majrooh Sultanpuri	solo
Jaise Ko Taisa	726	"Ab Ke Sawan Mein"	R. D. Burman	Majrooh Sultanpuri	Lata Mangeshkar
Jaise Ko Taisa	727	"Kaunsi Hai Woh Cheez"	R. D. Burman	Majrooh Sultanpuri	Asha Bhosle
Jaise Ko Taisa	728	"Bhaiya Re Bhaiya Re"	R. D. Burman	Majrooh Sultanpuri	Asha Bhosle
Jeevan Sukh	729	"Do Nigahen Teri"	Sapan-Jagmohan	Naqsh Lyallpuri	Asha Bhosle
Jheel Ke Us Paar	730	"Kya Nazare Kya Sitare"	R. D. Burman	Anand Bakshi	solo
Joshila	731	"Kiska Rasta Dekhe Ae Dil"	R. D. Burman	Sahir Ludhianvi	solo
Joshila	732	"Kuchh Bhi Karlo"	R. D. Burman	Sahir Ludhianvi	Lata Mangeshkar
Joshila	733	"Dil Mein Jo Baatein Hai"	R. D. Burman	Sahir Ludhianvi	Asha Bhosle
Jugnu	734	"Tera Peechha Na Main Chhodunga"	S. D. Burman	Anand Bakshi	solo
Jugnu	735	"Gir Gaya Jhumka"	S. D. Burman	Anand Bakshi	Lata Mangeshkar
Jugnu	736	"Deep Diwali Ke Jhoothe"	S. D. Burman	Anand Bakshi	Sushma Shreshtha
Jwaar Bhata	737	"Tera Mera Pyaar Shuru"	Laxmikant-Pyarelal	Rajendra Krishan	solo
Jwaar Bhata	738	"Daal Roti Khao"	Laxmikant-Pyarelal	Rajendra Krishan	Lata Mangeshkar
Kahani Kismat Ki	739	"Duniya Mujhse Kehti Hai"	Kalyanji-Anandji	Rajendra Krishan	solo
Kahani Kismat Ki	740	"Rafta Rafta Dekho Aankh Meri Ladi"	Kalyanji-Anandji	Rajendra Krishan	Usha Timothy
Kashmakash	741	"Jitna Zaroori Man Ka Milan"	Kalyanji-Anandji	Indeevar	Rekha
Keemat	742	"Ae Hero Aage Badh"	Laxmikant-Pyarelal	Anand Bakshi	solo
Keemat	743	"Maaf Karo O Baba"	Laxmikant-Pyarelal	Anand Bakshi	Lata Mangeshkar
Khoon Khoon	744	"Teri Meri Meri Teri"	Vijay Singh	Hasrat Jaipuri	Sushma Shreshtha, Jayshree
Kunwara Badan	745	"Kuchh Bhooli Hui Yaadein"	Ghanshyam	Rajendra Krishan	solo
Nafrat	746	"Raah Mein Kaliya Khilake Yaara"	R. D. Burman	Majrooh Sultanpuri	solo
Nafrat	747	"Mera Yaar Dildar Jo Na Hota"	R. D. Burman	Majrooh Sultanpuri	Asha Bhosle
Naina	748	"Jane Mujhe Tune Yeh Kya Cheez Pila Di"	Shankar-Jaikishan	Indeevar	Sharda
Namak Haraam	749	"Diye Jalte Hain"	R. D. Burman	Anand Bakshi	solo
Namak Haraam	750	"Nadiya Se Dariya"	R. D. Burman	Anand Bakshi	solo
Namak Haraam	751	"Woh Jhootha Hai"	R. D. Burman	Anand Bakshi	solo
Namak Haraam	752	"Main Shayar Badnaam"	R. D. Burman	Anand Bakshi	solo
Nanha Shikari	753	"Main Nanha Shikari"	Bappi Lahiri	S. H. Bihari	solo
Nanha Shikari	754	"Tu Meri Manzil"	Bappi Lahiri	Gauhar Kanpuri	Asha Bhosle
Naya Nasha	755	"Ek Ladki Le Gayi Dil"	Sapan Chakraborty	Anand Bakshi	solo
Nirdosh	756	"Kasoor Meri Nazron Ka Tha"	Laxmikant-Pyarelal	Asad Bhopali	solo
Phagun	757	"Laali Mere Laal Ki"	S. D. Burman	Majrooh Sultanpuri	Pankaj Mitra, Sunil Kumar, R. S. Bedi
Phagun	758	"Kab Mane O Dil Ke Mastane"	S. D. Burman	Majrooh Sultanpuri	Asha Bhosle
Pyaar Ka Rishta	759	"O Nakhrewali"	Shankar-Jaikishan	Indeevar	Asha Bhosle
Raja Rani	760	"Main Ek Chor"	R. D. Burman	Anand Bakshi	Lata Mangeshkar
Raja Aur Jaani	761	"Mere Dil Jhoom Jhoom"	Satyam	P. L. Santoshi, Hasrat Jaipuri	solo
Raja Aur Jaani	762	"Tum Jo Mile Toh"	Satyam	P. L. Santoshi, Hasrat Jaipuri	Asha Bhosle
Rehnuma	763	"Aaj Mujhe Jal Jane Bhi Do"	Madan Mohan	Naqsh Lyallpuri	solo
Rehnuma	764	"Ladkiyon Ko Chahiye"	Madan Mohan	Naqsh Lyallpuri	solo
Rickshawala	765	"Maine Kaha Zid Chhod De"	R. D. Burman	Anand Bakshi	Lata Mangeshkar
Rickshawala	766	"Kis Tarah Ki Hansi"	R. D. Burman	Anand Bakshi	solo
Rickshawala	767	"Phoolon Ki Duniya Se"	R. D. Burman	Anand Bakshi	Asha Bhosle
Samjhauta	768	"Tanak Tuk Tanda"	Kalyanji-Anandji	Verma Malik	solo
Samjhauta	769	"Samjhauta Ghamon Se Kar Lo"	Kalyanji-Anandji	Indeevar	solo
Samjhauta	770	"Na Roop Dekhiye"	Kalyanji-Anandji	Indeevar	solo
Saudagar	771	"Har Haseen Cheez Ka"	Ravindra Jain	Ravindra Jain	solo
Shareef Budmaash	772	"Main Nikal Jaoonga"	R. D. Burman	Anand Bakshi	solo
Shareef Budmaash	773	"Tere Sau Deewane"	R. D. Burman	Anand Bakshi	solo
Shareef Budmaash	774	"Neend Chura Ke Raaton Mein"	R. D. Burman	Anand Bakshi	Asha Bhosle
Teen Chor	775	"Meri Mehbooba"	Sonik-Omi	Rajendra Krishan	Lata Mangeshkar
Yaadon Ki Baraat	776	"O Meri Soni Meri Tamanna"	R. D. Burman	Majrooh Sultanpuri	Asha Bhosle
Yaadon Ki Baraat	777	"Lekar Hum Deewana Dil"	R. D. Burman	Majrooh Sultanpuri	Asha Bhosle
Yaadon Ki Baraat	778	"Aapke Kamre Mein Koi Rehta Hai"	R. D. Burman	Majrooh Sultanpuri	Asha Bhosle, R D Burman
Yaadon Ki Baraat	779	"Yaadon Ki Baraat Nikli Hai" (male)	R. D. Burman	Majrooh Sultanpuri	Mohammed Rafi
Yauwan	780	"Tumhari Berukhi Se Pareshan"	Sonik-Omi	Omkar Verma	solo

==== 1974 ====
Film	No.	Song	Composer(s)	Writer(s)	Co-artist(s)
36 Ghante	781	"Chup Ho Aaj"	Sapan Chakraborty	Sahir Ludhianvi	solo
36 Ghante	782	"Jaane Aaj Kya Hua"	Sapan Chakraborty	Sahir Ludhianvi	Asha Bhosle
5 Rifles	783	"Jabse Sarkar Ne Nashabandi Tod Di"	Kalyanji – Anandji	Rajendra Krishan	solo
5 Rifles	784	"Pyar Ke Patang Ki Dor"	Kalyanji – Anandji	Rajendra Krishan	solo
5 Rifles	785	"Tera Husn Allah Allah"	Kalyanji – Anandji	Rajendra Krishan	solo
5 Rifles	786	"Duniya Ko Banaane Wale"	Kalyanji – Anandji	Rajendra Krishan	solo
Aang Se Aang Laga Le	787	"Baadal Kaala Koyal Kaali"	Pradeep Roychowdhury	Naqsh Lyallpuri	
Aang Se Aang Laga Le	788	"Dil Mera Dil Yeh Kahe"	Pradeep Roychowdhury	Naqsh Lyallpuri	
Aap Ki Kasam	789	"Jai Jai Shiv Shankar"	R. D. Burman	Anand Bakshi	Lata Mangeshkar
Aap Ki Kasam	790	"Karvatein Badalte Rahe"	R. D. Burman	Anand Bakshi	Lata Mangeshkar
Aap Ki Kasam	791	"Suno Kaho"	R. D. Burman	Anand Bakshi	Lata Mangeshkar
Aap Ki Kasam	792	"Paas Nahin Aana"	R. D. Burman	Anand Bakshi	Lata Mangeshkar
Aap Ki Kasam	793	"Zindagi Ke Safar Mein"	R. D. Burman	Anand Bakshi	solo
Aarop	794	"Nainon Mein Darpan"	Bhupen Hazarika	Maya Govind	Lata Mangeshkar
Ajnabee	795	"Bheegi Bheegi Raaton Mein"	R D Burman	Anand Bakshi	Lata Mangeshkar
Ajnabee	796	"Hum Dono Do Premi"	R D Burman	Anand Bakshi	Lata Mangeshkar
Ajnabee	797	"Satrah Baras Ki Chhokriyan"	R D Burman	Anand Bakshi	Asha Bhosle
Ajnabee	798	"Ek Ajnabee Haseena Se"	R D Burman	Anand Bakshi	solo
Amir Garib	799	"Main Aaya Hoon"	Laxmikant-Pyarelal	Anand Bakshi	solo
Amir Garib	800	"Moni Aur Soni Ki Hai Jodi"	Laxmikant-Pyarelal	Anand Bakshi	solo
Amir Garib	801	"Mere Pyale Mein Sharab Daal"	Laxmikant-Pyarelal	Anand Bakshi	Manna Dey
Amir Garib	802	"Kahin Janaab Ko Mera Intezaar"	Laxmikant-Pyarelal	Anand Bakshi	Lata Mangeshkar
Amir Garib	803	"Baith Jaa Khadi Ho Jaa"	Laxmikant-Pyarelal	Anand Bakshi	Lata Mangeshkar
Anjaan Raahen	804	"We Love Sunday"	Kalyanji-Anandji	Indeevar	solo
Badla	805	"Shor Mach Gaya"	Laxmikant-Pyarelal	Anand Bakshi	solo
Badhti Ka Naam Dadhi	806	"Bhole Re Sajan"	Kishore Kumar	Irshad	Asha Bhosle
Badhti Ka Naam Dadhi	807	"Sun Chaache Bol Bhatije"	Kishore Kumar	Irshad	Amit Kumar
Badhti Ka Naam Dadhi	808	"Zindagi Haseen Hai"	Kishore Kumar	Irshad	Bhupinder Singh
Badhti Ka Naam Dadhi	809	"Phir Suhani Shaam Dhali"	Kishore Kumar	Irshad	solo
Badhti Ka Naam Dadhi	810	"Badhti Ka Naam Dhadhi"	Kishore Kumar	Irshad	solo
Badhti Ka Naam Dadhi	811	"He Gori Banki Chhori"	Kishore Kumar	Irshad	solo
Bazaar Band Karo	812	"Nahin Chhodoge Kabhi Mera Haath"	Bappi Lahiri	Kulwant Jani	Asha Bhosle
Bidaai	813	"Kabhi Khole Na Tijori Ka Taala"	Laxmikant-Pyarelal	Anand Bakshi	solo
Bidaai	814	"Yeh Hai Mera Premi"	Laxmikant-Pyarelal	Anand Bakshi	Lata Mangeshkar
Call Girl	815	"Ulfat Mein Zamane Ki" (male)	Sapan-Jagmohan	Naqsh Lyallpuri	solo
Call Girl	816	"Hum Hai Jahan Woh"	Sapan-Jagmohan	Naqsh Lyallpuri	Asha Bhosle
Call Girl	817	"Jawani Mere Yaara Na Aayegi"	Sapan-Jagmohan	Naqsh Lyallpuri	Ranu Mukherjee
Charitraheen	818	"Dil Se Dil Milne Ka Koi Kaaran Hoga"	R. D. Burman	Anand Bakshi	Lata Mangeshkar
Chor Machaye Shor	819	"Ghungroo Ki Tarah"	Ravindra Jain	Ravindra Jain	solo
Chor Machaye Shor	820	"Le Jaayenge Le Jaayenge"	Ravindra Jain	Indrajit Singh Tulsi	Asha Bhosle
Chattan Singh	821	"Jab Koi Ladki"	Kalyanji-Anandji	Verma Malik	Asha Bhosle
Dil Diwana	822	"Ja Ja Re Ja Bewafa"	R D Burman	Anand Bakshi	Asha Bhosle
Dil Diwana	823	"Mujhko Mohabhat Mein Dhokha"	R D Burman	Anand Bakshi	Asha Bhosle
Dil Diwana	824	"Kisise Dosti Kar Lo"	R D Burman	Anand Bakshi	Asha Bhosle
Dil Diwana	825	"Main Ladki"	R D Burman	Anand Bakshi	Asha Bhosle
Dil Diwana	826	"Khan Chacha"	R D Burman	Anand Bakshi	Asha Bhosle, Manna Dey
Dil Diwana	827	"Sun Neeta"	R D Burman	Anand Bakshi	solo
Do Number Ke Ameer	828	"Dil Kisi Ko Jo Diya Na Ho"	Sapan-Jagmohan	Indeevar	Asha Bhosle
Dost	829	"Gaadi Bula Rahi Hai"	Laxmikant-Pyarelal	Anand Bakshi	solo
Dulhan	830	"Jaane Chaman Jane Bahar"	Laxmikant-Pyarelal	Anand Bakshi	solo
Farebi	831	"Ae Mere Dil Khushi Se Machal"	Laxmikant-Pyarelal	Verma Malik	solo
Goonj	832	"Tumko Kitna Pyaar Hai"	R D Burman	Majrooh Sultanpuri	Lata Mangeshkar
Haath Ki Safai	833	"Humko Mohabbat Ho Gayi Hai"	Kalyanji-Anandji	Gulshan Bawra	Lata Mangeshkar
Haath Ki Safai	834	"Peenewalon Ko"	Kalyanji-Anandji	Gulshan Bawra	Hema Malini
Humshakal	835	"Main Tumko Doongi Saiyan"	R. D. Burman	Anand Bakshi	Asha Bhosle
Humshakal	836	"Hum Tum Gumsum Raat"	R. D. Burman	Anand Bakshi	Asha Bhosle
Humshakal	837	"Rasta Dekhe Tera"	R. D. Burman	Anand Bakshi	solo
Humshakal	838	"Jhoomo Tum Nacho"	R. D. Burman	Anand Bakshi	Sushma Shreshtha
Imaan	839	"Paise Bina Pyaar Fizool Hai"	R. D. Burman	Anand Bakshi	Manna Dey
Imtihan	840	"Ruk Jaana Nahin"	Laxmikant-Pyarelal	Majrooh Sultanpuri	solo
Imtihan	841	"Ruk Jaana Nahin" (version 2)	Laxmikant-Pyarelal	Majrooh Sultanpuri	solo
International Crook	842	"Pyar Ki Mujhpe Kya Nazar Daali"	Shankar-Jaikishan	Aziz Kashmiri	Asha Bhosle
International Crook	843	"Mere Dil Mein Tu Hi"	Shankar-Jaikishan	Aziz Kashmiri	solo
International Crook	844	"Poochha Jo Pyaar Kya Hai"	Shankar-Jaikishan	Aziz Kashmiri	Ranu Mukherjee
Ishk Ishk Ishk	845	"Chal Sathi Chal"	R. D. Burman	Anand Bakshi	solo
Ishk Ishk Ishk	846	"Acche Bachche Nahin Rote Hai"	R. D. Burman	Anand Bakshi	solo
Ishk Ishk Ishk	847	"Mujhko Agar Ijaazat Ho To"	R. D. Burman	Anand Bakshi	solo
Ishk Ishk Ishk	848	"Wallah Kya Nazara Hai"	R. D. Burman	Anand Bakshi	Asha Bhosle, Sushma Shreshtha
Ishk Ishk Ishk	849	"Tim Tim Chamka"	R. D. Burman	Anand Bakshi	Asha Bhosle
Ishk Ishk Ishk	850	"Ishk Ishk Ishk"	R. D. Burman	Anand Bakshi	Asha Bhosle
Ishk Ishk Ishk	851	"Bheegi Bheegi Aankhen"	R. D. Burman	Anand Bakshi	Asha Bhosle
Jurm Aur Sazaa	852	"Khoobsurat Tu Sanam"	Laxmikant-Pyarelal	Asad Bhopali	Asha Bhosle
Kasauti	853	"Hum Bolega To Bologe"	Kalyanji-Anandji	Verma Malik	solo
Kasauti	854	"Ho Jaata Hai Pyaar"	Kalyanji-Anandji	Indeevar	Lata Mangeshkar
Khote Sikkay	855	"Jeevan Mein Tu Darna Nahin" (Part 1)	R. D. Burman	Majrooh Sultanpuri	solo
Khote Sikkay	856	"Jeevan Mein Tu Darna Nahin" (Part 2)	R. D. Burman	Majrooh Sultanpuri	solo
Khote Sikkay	857	"Jeevan Mein Tu Darna Nahin" (Part 3)	R. D. Burman	Majrooh Sultanpuri	solo
Khoon Ki Keemat	858	"Hai Kismaat Se Yeh Mehfil"	Sonik-Omi	Verma Malik	Asha Bhosle
Khoon Ki Keemat	859	"Idhar Aa Let Jaa"	Sonik-Omi	Verma Malik	Minoo Purushottam
Kisan Aur Bhagwan	860	"Ban Gayi Baat Sajna"	Prem Dhawan	Kavi Pradeep	Asha Bhosle
Kora Kagaz	861	"Mera Jeevan Kora Kaagaz"	Kalyanji-Anandji	M G Hashmat	solo
Kshitij	862	"Andhe Safar Mein"	Sharda	Balkavi Bairagi"	solo
Kunwara Baap	863	"Main Hoon Ghoda"	Rajesh Roshan	Majrooh Sultanpuri	Mehmood
Kunwara Baap	864	"Jai Bholenath"	Rajesh Roshan	Majrooh Sultanpuri	Lata Mangeshkar
Kunwara Baap	865	"Aari Aaja Nindiya"	Rajesh Roshan	Majrooh Sultanpuri	Lata Mangeshkar, Mehmood
Maa Bahen Aur Biwi	866	"Raghupati Raghav"	Sharda	Vedpal Sharma, Qamar Jalalabadi	solo
Madhosh	867	"Mera Chhota Sa Dil"	R. D. Burman	Majrooh Sultanpuri	Asha Bhosle
Madhosh	868	"Kasam Khao Tum"	R. D. Burman	Majrooh Sultanpuri	Asha Bhosle
Majboor	869	"Dekh Sakta Hoon Main (Male)"	Laxmikant-Pyarelal	Anand Bakshi	solo
Majboor	870	"Aadmi Jo Kehta Hai"	Laxmikant-Pyarelal	Anand Bakshi	solo
Majboor	871	"Daru Ke Botal Mein"	Laxmikant-Pyarelal	Anand Bakshi	solo
Manchali	872	"Mile Kahin Do Ajnabi"	Laxmikant-Pyarelal	Anand Bakshi	solo
Manchali	873	"O Manchali Kahan Chali"	Laxmikant-Pyarelal	Anand Bakshi	solo
Manchali	874	"Gham Ka Fasana"	Laxmikant-Pyarelal	Anand Bakshi	Leena Chandavarkar
Manoranjan	875	"Aaya Hoon Main Tujhko Le Jaoonga"	R D Burman	Anand Bakshi	Asha Bhosle
Manoranjan	876	"Goyake Chunanche Kiya Maine Pyar"	R D Burman	Anand Bakshi	Lata Mangeshka, Manna Dey
Mr. Romeo	877	"Is Ishq Mein Har Aashiq Ko"	R. D. Burman	Anand Bakshi	Manna Dey
Mr. Romeo	878	"Hey Mujhe Dil De"	R. D. Burman	Anand Bakshi	Asha Bhosle, Bhupinder Singh, R. D. Burman
Mr. Romeo	879	"Dil Toota Kya Hai Apna"	R. D. Burman	Anand Bakshi	solo
Mr. Romeo	880	"Na Soyenge Na Sone Denge"	R. D. Burman	Anand Bakshi	Lata Mangeshkar
Mr. Romeo	881	"Yahan Nahin Kahoongi"	R. D. Burman	Anand Bakshi	Asha Bhosle
Naya Din Nai Raat	882	"Krishna Krishna Bolo"	Laxmikant-Pyarelal	Rajendra Krishan	Lata Mangeshkar
Nirmaan	883	"Kasam Khuda Ki"	Laxmikant-Pyarelal	Majrooh Sultanpuri	Asha Bhosle
N/A	884	"Happy Christmas To You"	R. D. Burman	Anand Bakshi	Lata Mangeshkar
Paap Aur Punya	885	"Bolo Baadal Ki Mehbooba"	Kalyanji-Anandji	Indeevar	Lata Mangeshkar
Paise Ki Gudiya	886	"Meri Baat Ke Maane Do"	Laxmikant-Pyarelal	Verma Malik	solo
Phir Kab Milogi	887	"Khit Pit Khit Kare"	R D Burman	Majrooh Sultanpuri	solo
Prem Nagar	888	"Yeh Thandi Hawaon Ne"	S D Burman	Anand Bakshi	Asha Bhosle
Prem Nagar	889	"Yeh Thandi Hawaon Ne (Part 2)"	S D Burman	Anand Bakshi	Asha Bhosle
Prem Nagar	890	"Kiska Mahal"	S D Burman	Anand Bakshi	Lata Mangeshkar
Prem Nagar	891	"Ik Muamma Hai"	S D Burman	Anand Bakshi	solo
Prem Nagar	892	"Bye Bye Miss Goodnight"	S D Burman	Anand Bakshi	solo
Prem Nagar	893	"Yeh Laal Rang"	S D Burman	Anand Bakshi	solo
Prem Nagar	894	"Jaa Jaa Jaa Mujhe Na Ab Yaad Aa"	S D Burman	Anand Bakshi	solo
Prem Shastra	895	"Mujhe Pyaar Kar"	Laxmikant-Pyarelal	Anand Bakshi	Asha Bhosle
Prem Shastra	896	"Naam Hamara Mashhoor"	Laxmikant-Pyarelal	Anand Bakshi	Asha Bhosle
Prem Shastra	897	"Main Sharab Pee Raha Hoon"	Laxmikant-Pyarelal	Anand Bakshi	solo
Raja Kaka	898	"Jee Chahta Hai Utha Le Jaoon" (version 1)	Kalyanji-Anandji	Anjaan	Asha Bhosle
Raja Kaka	899	"Jee Chahta Hai Utha Le Jaoon" (version 2)	Kalyanji-Anandji	Anjaan	Asha Bhosle
Raja Kaka	900	"Raja Kaka Hoon"	Kalyanji-Anandji	Anjaan	solo
Resham Ki Dori	901	"Chamka Paseena"	Kalyanji-Anandji	Indeevar	solo
Roti	902	"Yaar Hamari Baat Suno"	Laxmikant-Pyarelal	Anand Bakshi	solo
Roti	903	"Yeh Public Hai"	Laxmikant-Pyarelal	Anand Bakshi	solo
Roti	904	"Naach Meri Bulbul"	Laxmikant-Pyarelal	Anand Bakshi	solo
Roti	905	"Gore Rang Pe Na Itna"	Laxmikant-Pyarelal	Anand Bakshi	Lata Mangeshkar
Sagina	906	"Uparwala Dukhiyon Ki"	S D Burman	Majrooh Sultanpuri	Dilip Kumar
Sagina	907	"Tumri Sang To Rain Bitayi"	S D Burman	Majrooh Sultanpuri	Lata Mangeshkar
Sagina	908	"Saala Main Toh Sahab Ban Gaya"	S D Burman	Majrooh Sultanpuri	Pankaj Mitra
Sagina	909	"Gajab Chamkai Bindiya Tori"	S D Burman	Majrooh Sultanpuri	Asha Bhosle
Shaandaar	910	"Itni Badi Duniya Mein"	Laxmikant-Pyarelal	Rajendra Krishan	Asha Bhosle
Shaandaar	911	"Aata Hai Aata Hai"	Laxmikant-Pyarelal	Rajendra Krishan	solo
Shubh Din	912	"Sun Le Saajan"	Kalyanji-Anandji	Verma Malik	Lata Mangeshkar
Shubh Din	913	"Naa Re Naa Mujhse"	Kalyanji-Anandji	Verma Malik	Lata Mangeshkar
Shubh Din	914	"Seedha Saadha Aadmi Hoon"	Kalyanji-Anandji	Verma Malik	solo
Trimurti	915	"O Maa O Maa"	R D Burman	Gulshan Bawra	Bhupinder Singh, Nitin Mukesh
Trimurti	916	"Milegi Ek Nayi Zindagi"	R D Burman	Gulshan Bawra	Lata Mangeshkar
Trimurti	917	"Hum Toh Hain Darshan Abhilashi"	R D Burman	Gulshan Bawra	Manna Dey
Ujala	918	"Maine To Yeh Jaana"	R. D. Burman	Majrooh Sultanpuri	Asha Bhosle
Ujala	919	"Ujale Andher Tere Pyaar Mein"	R. D. Burman	Majrooh Sultanpuri	solo
Vachan	920	"London Se Aaya Hoon"	Shankar-Jaikishan	Hasrat Jaipuri	Mahendra Kapoor
Vachan	921	"Aye Habeeba Khushnaseeba"	Shankar-Jaikishan	Kiran Kalyani	solo
Vachan	922	"Dil Ki Guldastan"	Shankar-Jaikishan	Shaily Shailendra	Sharda
Woh Main Nahin	923	"Honthon Se Kayi Lutaye Tarane"	Sonik-Omi	Verma Malik	Asha Bhosle
Woh Main Nahin	924	"Chahe Purush Ho, Chahe Nari"	Sonik-Omi	Verma Malik	Narendra Chanchal
Zehreela Insaan	925	"Dum Tumhari Dum"	R. D. Burman	Majrooh Sultanpuri	solo
Zehreela Insaan	926	"O Hansini"	R. D. Burman	Majrooh Sultanpuri	solo

==== 1975 ====
Film	No.	Song	Composer(s)	Writer(s)	Co-artist(s)
Aakhri Dao	927	"Jhoothe Sang Pyaar Kiya"	Laxmikant-Pyarelal	Hasrat Jaipuri	Lata Mangeshkar
Aakraman	928	"Dekho Veer Jawaanon"	Laxmikant-Pyarelal	Anand Bakshi	solo
Aakraman	929	"Chhoti Umar Mein"	Laxmikant-Pyarelal	Anand Bakshi	solo
Aakraman	930	"Fauji Gaya Jab Gaon Mein"	Laxmikant-Pyarelal	Anand Bakshi	solo
Aakraman	931	"Woh Ek Haseen Ladki"	Laxmikant-Pyarelal	Anand Bakshi	solo
Aakraman	932	"Yeh Mausam Aaya Hai"	Laxmikant-Pyarelal	Anand Bakshi	Lata Mangeshkar
Aandhi	933	"Is Mod Se Jaate Hain"	R D Burman	Gulzar	Lata Mangeshkar
Aandhi	934	"Tum Aa Gaye Ho"	R D Burman	Gulzar	Lata Mangeshkar
Aandhi	935	"Tere Bina Zindagi Se Koi"	R D Burman	Gulzar	Lata Mangeshkar
Amanush	936	"Na Poochho Koi Hamen"	Shyamal Mitra	Indeevar	solo
Amanush	937	"Dil Aisa Kisi Ne Mera Toda"	Shyamal Mitra	Indeevar	solo
Amanush	938	"Tere Gaalon Ko Choomun"	Shyamal Mitra	Indeevar	Asha Bhosle
Anari	939	"Hum Toh Ek Anari"	Laxmikant-Pyarelal	Majrooh Sultanpuri	Mehmood
Anari	940	"Tere Bagair Jaane Jaana"	Laxmikant-Pyarelal	Majrooh Sultanpuri	solo
Anari	941	"Hamen Kya Garaz"	Laxmikant-Pyarelal	Majrooh Sultanpuri	Asha Bhosle
Andhera	942	"Rang Doonga Sabko Main" (Happy)	Sonik-Omi	Gulshan Bawra	solo
Andhera	943	"Rang Doonga Sabko Main" (Sad)	Sonik-Omi	Gulshan Bawra	solo
Angaaray	944	"Tang Main Aa Gaya"	Chitragupta	Anand Bakshi	Asha Bhosle
Anokha	945	"Meri Baaton Se Tum Bore Ho Gayi Ho"	Kalyanji-Anandji	Saawan Kymar Tak	Usha Timothy
Apne Rang Hazaar	946	"Mere Kaali Kalooti Je Nakhre"	Laxmikant-Pyarelal	Anjaan	Suman Kalyanpur
Chori Mera Kaam	947	"Chori Mera Kaam"	Kalyanji-Anandji	Verma Malik	Asha Bhosle
Chori Mera Kaam	948	"Kaahe Ko"	Kalyanji-Anandji	Verma Malik	Asha Bhosle
Chori Mera Kaam	949	"Meri Nazar Se Bacha Naa Koi"	Kalyanji-Anandji	Verma Malik	solo
Chori Mera Kaam	950	"Main Kachche Angoor Ki Bel"	Kalyanji-Anandji	Verma Malik	Amit Kumar, Kanchan
Chupke Chupke	951	"Sa Re Ga Ma"	S D Burman	Anand Bakshi	Mohammed Rafi
Dafaa 302	952	"Tu Mera Raam" (happy)	Laxmikant-Pyarelal	Indeevar	solo
Dafaa 302	953	"Tu Mera Raam" (sad)	Laxmikant-Pyarelal	Indeevar	solo
Deewar	954	"Maine Tujhe Maanga"	R D Burman	Sahir Ludhianvi	Asha Bhosle
Deewar	955	"Keh Doon Tumhe"	R D Burman	Sahir Ludhianvi	Asha Bhosle
Dharam Karam	956	"Mukh Pe Jo Chhidka Paani"	R D Burman	Majrooh Sultanpuri	Lata Mangeshkar
Dharam Karam	957	"Tu Kahan Gayi Thi"	R D Burman	Majrooh Sultanpuri	Lata Mangeshkar
Dharam Karam	958	"Baat Thi Yaar Ek Ber Ki"	R D Burman	Majrooh Sultanpuri	solo
Dharam Karam	959	"Tere Humsafar Geet Hain Tere"	R D Burman	Majrooh Sultanpuri	Mukesh, Asha Bhosle
Dharam Karam	960	"Na Ho Bas Mein Tere"	R D Burman	Majrooh Sultanpuri	Mukesh, Sushma Shreshtha
Dharmatma	961	"Tere Chehre Mein Woh Jadoo"	Kalyanji-Anandji	Indeevar	solo
Do Jhoot	962	"Chalo Bhool Jaayen Jahan Kl"	Shankar-Jaikishan	Vitthalbhai Patel	Lata Mangeshkar
Do Jhoot	963	"Chhatri Na Khol"	Shankar-Jaikishan	M G Hashmat	Usha Mangeshkar
Do Thug	964	"Humne Karke Mohabbat"	Kalyanji-Anandji	Rajendra Krishan	Asha Bhosle
Ek Gaon Ki Kahani	965	"Tuhi Bataa Tujhe Paane Ka Kaunsa Hai Tareeka"	Ravindra Jain	Indeevar	Asha Bhosle
Ek Gaon Ki Kahani	966	"Kesar Jaise Tu Kishori"	Ravindra Jain	Indeevar	Asha Bhosle
Ek Hanso Ka Jodaa	967	"Pyaar Se Tum Mile"	Jaidev	Naqsh Lyallpuri	Asha Bhosle
Ek Hanso Ka Jodaa	968	"Saathi Milte Hain Bade Mushkil Se"	Jaidev	Naqsh Lyallpuri	solo
Ek Mahal Ho Sapnon Ka	969	"Humse Poochho"	Ravi	Sahir Ludhianvi	solo
Ek Mahal Ho Sapnon Ka	970	"Dekha Hai Zindagi Ko"	Ravi	Sahir Ludhianvi	solo
Ek Mahal Ho Sapnon Ka	971	"Dil Mein Kisi Ke Pyar Ka (Male)"	Ravi	Sahir Ludhianvi	solo
Faraar	972	"Main Pyaasa Tum Saawan" (male)	Kalyanji-Anandji	Rajendra Krishan	solo
Faraar	973	"Main Pyaasa Tum Saawan" (duet)	Kalyanji-Anandji	Rajendra Krishan	Lata Mangeshkar
Ganga Ki Kasam	974	"O Mere Dil Jaani"	Sonik-Omi	Qamar Jalalabadi	Asha Bhosle, Minoo Purushottam
Ganga Ki Kasam	975	"Maa Kahega Mujhko"	Sonik-Omi	Qamar Jalalabadi	
Ganga Ki Kasam	976	"Pyaar Ka Tu Lekar Naam"	Sonik-Omi	Qamar Jalalabadi	
Ganga Ki Kasam	977	"Aam Le Lo"	Sonik-Omi	Qamar Jalalabadi	
Geet Gata Chal	978	"Bachpan Har Gham Se Begana"	Ravindra Jain	Ravindra Jain	solo
Julie	979	"Bhool Gaya Sab Kuchh"	Rajesh Roshan	Anand Bakshi	Lata Mangeshkar
Julie	980	"Dil Kya Kare Jab Kisise"	Rajesh Roshan	Anand Bakshi	solo
Kala Sona	981	"Tak Jhoom Nacho"	R D Burman	Majrooh Sultanpuri	Asha Bhosle
Kahtey Hain Mujhko Raja	982	"Aiyo Re Gaya Kaam Se"	R D Burman	Majrooh Sultanpuri	Asha Bhosle
Kahtey Hain Mujhko Raja	983	"Bam Cheek Cheek Cham"	R D Burman	Majrooh Sultanpuri	solo
Kahtey Hain Mujhko Raja	984	"Hey Yeh Lo Main Aa Gaya"	R D Burman	Majrooh Sultanpuri	solo
Khel Khel Mein	985	"Aye Lo Pyaar Ke Din Aaye"	R D Burman	Gulshan Bawra	Asha Bhosle
Khel Khel Mein	986	"Khullam Khulla Pyaar Karenge Hum Dono"	R D Burman	Gulshan Bawra	Asha Bhosle
Khel Khel Mein	987	"Ek Main Aur Ek Tu"	R D Burman	Gulshan Bawra	Asha Bhosle
Khushboo	988	"O Maajhi Re"	R D Burman	Gulzar	solo
Lafange	989	"Hum Lafange Hain"	Laxmikant-Pyarelal	Anand Bakshi	solo
Mere Sajna	990	"Maine Kuchh Khoya Hai"	Laxmikant-Pyarelal	Majrooh Sultanpuri	solo
Mili	991	"Badi Sooni Sooni Hai"	S D Burman	Yogesh	solo
Mili	992	"Aaye Tum Yaad Mujhe"	S D Burman	Yogesh	solo
Mili	993	"Badi Sooni Sooni Hai (Revival)"	S D Burman	Yogesh	solo
Mili	994	"Badi Sooni Hai Zindagi (With Dialogues)"	S D Burman	Yogesh	Amitabh Bachchan
Ponga Pandit	995	"Ganga Ghat Ka Paani Piya Hai"	Laxmikant-Pyarelal	Rajendra Krishan	solo
Ponga Pandit	996	"Woh Mere Peechhe Padi Huyi Hai"	Laxmikant-Pyarelal	Rajendra Krishan	solo
Ponga Pandit	997	"Main Jab Chhedoonga Dil Ka"	Laxmikant-Pyarelal	Rajendra Krishan	solo
Ponga Pandit	998	"Jijaji Meri Didi Hai Anadi"	Laxmikant-Pyarelal	Rajendra Krishan	Asha Bhosle, Usha Mangeshkar
Prem Kahani	999	"Chal Dariya Mein"	Laxmikant-Pyarelal	Anand Bakshi	Lata Mangeshkar
Prem Kahani	1000	"Prem Kahani Mein"	Laxmikant-Pyarelal	Anand Bakshi	Lata Mangeshkar
Qaid	1001	"Yeh To Zindagi Hai"	Nitin–Mangesh	Maya Govind	Nitin
Qaid	1002	"Deewana Hoon Pyaar Ka"	Nitin–Mangesh	Maya Govind	solo
Raaja	1003	"Kaun Hoon Main"	R D Burman	Anand Bakshi	Asha Bhosle
Raaja	1004	"Jee Chahe Jee Chahe"	R D Burman	Anand Bakshi	Lata Mangeshkar
Raaja	1005	"Kal Yahan Aayi Thi Woh"	R D Burman	Anand Bakshi	solo
Salaakhen	1006	"Seema Seema Seema"	Ravindra Jain	Ravindra Jain	Asha Bhosle
Sholay	1007	"Koi Haseena Jab Rooth Jaati Hai"	R D Burman	Anand Bakshi	solo
Sholay	1008	"Yeh Dosti (Sad)"	R D Burman	Anand Bakshi	solo
Sholay	1009	"Yeh Dosti Hum Nahin Todenge"	R D Burman	Anand Bakshi	Manna Dey
Sholay	1010	"Holi Ke Din"	R D Burman	Anand Bakshi	Lata Mangeshkar
Sholay	1011	"Ke Chaand Sa Koi Chehra"	R D Burman	Anand Bakshi	Manna Dey, Bhupinder Singh, Anand Bakshi
Sunehra Sansar	1012	"Hello Hello Kya Haal Hai"	Naushad	Asha Bhosle	
Uljhan	1013	"Apne Jeevan Ki Uljhan Ko"	Kalyanji-Anandji	M G Hashmat	solo
Uljhan	1014	"Aaj Pyaare Pyaare Se Lagte Hain"	Kalyanji-Anandji	M G Hashmat	Sulakshana Pandit
Warrant	1015	"Ruk Jaa O Jana"	R D Burman	Anand Bakshi	solo
Warrant	1016	"Sun Bhai Baraati"	R D Burman	Anand Bakshi	solo
Warrant	1017	"Ladi Najariya Ladi"	R D Burman	Anand Bakshi	Lata Mangeshkar
Zakhmee	1018	"Jalta Hai Jiya Mera"	Bappi Lahiri	Gauhar Kanpuri	Asha Bhosle
Zakhmee	1019	"Nothing Is Impossible Now"	Bappi Lahiri	Gauhar Kanpuri	Mohammed Rafi, Bappi Lahiri
Zakhmee	1020	"Dil Mein Holi Jal Rahi Hai"	Bappi Lahiri	Gauhar Kanpuri	solo
Zameer	1021	"Anka Banka Tali Talaka"	Sapan Chakraborty	Indrajit Singh Tulsi	solo
Zameer	1022	"Ab Yahan Koi"	Sapan Chakraborty	Sahir Ludhianvi	solo
Zameer	1023	"Phoolon Ke Dere Mein"	Sapan Chakraborty	Sahir Ludhianvi	solo
Zameer	1024	"Tum Bhi Chalo" (Duet)	Sapan Chakraborty	Sahir Ludhianvi	Asha Bhosle
Zameer	1025	"Tum Bhi Chalo" (Male)	Sapan Chakraborty	Sahir Ludhianvi	solo
Zameer	1026	"Zindagi Hansne Gaane Ke Liye" (version 1)	Sapan Chakraborty	Sahir Ludhianvi	solo
Zinda Dil	1027	"O Meri Jaan By God"	Laxmikant-Pyarelal	Verma Malik	solo
Zorro	1028	"Kya Cheez Hai Aurat"	Kalyanji-Anandji	Verma Malik	Asha Bhosle

==== 1976 ====
Film	No.	Song	Composer(s)	Writer(s)	Co-artist(s)
Aaj Ka Mahaatma	1029	"Chandni Chand Se Hoti Hai"	Laxmikant-Pyarelal	Majrooh Sultanpuri	Asha Bhosle
Aaj Ka Mahaatma	1030	"Tha Woh Bhi Kya Zamana"	Laxmikant-Pyarelal	Majrooh Sultanpuri	solo
Aaj Ka Ye Ghar	1031	"Baar Baar Ansuon Ne"	Anil-Arun	M. G. Hashmat	solo
Aaj Ka Ye Ghar	1032	"Baar Baar Ansuon Ne (Version 2)"	Anil-Arun	M. G. Hashmat	solo
Aap Beati	1033	Ban Gaya Buddha Sharabi"	Laxmikant-Pyarelal	Anand Bakshi	Manna Dey
Aap Beati	1034	"Kismat Ki Baat"	Laxmikant-Pyarelal	Anand Bakshi	Amit Kumar
Aap Beati	1035	"Meri Dilruba Mere Paas Aa"	Laxmikant-Pyarelal	Anand Bakshi	Lata Mangeshkar, Usha Mangeshkar
Arjun Pandit	1036	"Dil Mera Uda Jaaye"	S D Burman	Majrooh Sultanpuri	solo
Balika Badhu	1037	"O Jhumkewali"	R D Burman	Anand Bakshi	Asha Bhosle
Barood	1038	"Matlab Jo Samjhe"	S D Burman	Anand Bakshi	solo
Bhanwar	1039	"Rang Le Aayenge"	R D Burman	Anand Bakshi	Asha Bhosle
Bhanwar	1040	"Aankhen Milayenge"	R D Burman	Anand Bakshi	Lata Mangeshkar
Bhanwar	1041	"Karo Baaten Mulaqaaten"	R D Burman	Anand Bakshi	Lata Mangeshkar
Bhanwar	1042	"Pehle Haar Mehbooba"	R D Burman	Anand Bakshi	solo
Bhanwar	1043	"Baraat Mein Log"	R D Burman	Anand Bakshi	Asha Bhosle, R D Burman
Bhoola Bhatka	1044	"Mauj Dhoonde Kinaara"	Kalyanji-Anandji	Anand Bakshi	solo
Bullet	1045	"Bullet Bullet Bullet"	R D Burman	Anand Bakshi	solo
Bullet	1046	"Chori Chori Chupke Chupke"	R D Burman	Anand Bakshi	Asha Bhosle
Bundal Baaz	1047	"Kya Hua Yaaron"	R D Burman	Majrooh Sultanpuri	Asha Bhosle
Bundal Baaz	1048	"Ruk Meri Jaan"	R D Burman	Majrooh Sultanpuri	solo
Bundal Baaz	1049	"Bemausam Bahar Ke Din"	R D Burman	Majrooh Sultanpuri	Lata Mangeshkar
Chalte Chalte	1050	"Chalte Chalte Mere Yeh Geet"	Bappi Lahiri	Amit Khanna	solo
Chalte Chalte	1051	"Chalte Chalte Mere Yeh Geet" (version 2)	Bappi Lahiri	Amit Khanna	solo
Charas	1052	"Kal Ke Haseen Mulaqaat Ke Liye"	Laxmikant-Pyarelal	Anand Bakshi	Lata Mangeshkar
Deewaangee	1053	"Haseenon Ke Chakkar Mein"	Ravindra Jain	Ravindra Jain	Amit Kumar
Deewaangee	1054	"Zamana Munh Dekhta Rah Gaya"	Ravindra Jain	Hasrat Jaipuri	Lata Mangeshkar
Deewaangee	1055	"Chal Sapnon Ke Shehar Mein"	S D Burman	Anand Bakshi	solo
Do Anjaane	1056	"Luk Chhip"	Kalyanji-Anandji	Anjaan	solo
Do Anjaane	1057	"Luk Chhip" (sad)	Kalyanji-Anandji	Anjaan	Shivangi Kolhapure
Do Khiladi	1058	"Meri Bhi Koi Behna Hoti"	Usha Khanna	Gauhar Kanpuri	solo
Do Ladkiyan	1059	"Talaash Hai Ek Ladki Ki"	Laxmikant-Pyarelal	Anand Bakshi	solo
Ek Se Badhkar Ek	1060	"Aankhon Mein Surma"	Kalyanji-Anandji	Verma Malik	Lata Mangeshkar
Fakira	1061	"Tota Maina Ki Kahani"	Ravindra Jain	Ravindra Jain	Lata Mangeshkar
Fakira	1062	"Hum Toh Jhuk Kar"	Ravindra Jain	Ravindra Jain	Mahendra Kapoor, Aziz Nazan, Bhushan Mehta
Ginny Aur Johnny	1063	"Come On Everybody"	Rajesh Roshan	Majrooh Sultanpuri	Mehmood
Ginny Aur Johnny	1064	"Johnny Ko Maine To Jaana Hai"	Rajesh Roshan	Majrooh Sultanpuri	Vijeta Pandit
Ginny Aur Johnny	1065	"Sun Ginniya"	Rajesh Roshan	Majrooh Sultanpuri	Vijeta Pandit
Ginny Aur Johnny	1066	"Jab Tu Badi Ho Jaayegi"	Rajesh Roshan	Majrooh Sultanpuri	Vijeta Pandit
Ginny Aur Johnny	1067	"Johnny Ko Maine To Jaana Hai (Sad)"	Rajesh Roshan	Majrooh Sultanpuri	Vijeta Pandit
Gumrah	1068	"Khule Khule Narm Narm Gesu"	Usha Khanna	Asad Bhopali	solo
Gumrah	1069	"Hath Chhudake Mera"	Usha Khanna	Asad Bhopali	solo
Harfan Maulaa	1070	"Apun To Yaari Mein"	Shyamji-Ghanshyamji	Majrooh Sultanpuri	solo
Hera Pheri	1071	"Barson Purana Yeh Yaarana"	Kalyanji-Anandji	Anjaan	solo
Hera Pheri	1072	"Waqt Ki Hera Pheri"	Kalyanji-Anandji	Indeevar	Mahendra Kapoor
Jaaneman	1073	"Ki Gal Hai Koi Nahin"	Laxmikant-Pyarelal	Anand Bakshi	Lata Mangeshkar
Jaaneman	1074	"Jaaneman Jaaneman Jaaneman" (version 1)	Laxmikant-Pyarelal	Anand Bakshi	solo
Jaaneman	1075	"Jaaneman Jaaneman Jaaneman" (version 2)	Laxmikant-Pyarelal	Anand Bakshi	solo
Jaaneman	1076	"Jaaneman Jaaneman Jaaneman" (version 3)	Laxmikant-Pyarelal	Anand Bakshi	solo
Jeevan Jyoti	1077	"Maujon Ki Doli Chali Re"	Salil Chowdhury	Anand Bakshi	solo
Jeevan Jyoti	1078	"Ranjhe Ki Aankhon Se Dekho"	Salil Chowdhury	Anand Bakshi	Lata Mangeshkar
Kabeela	1079	"Tu Kehta Hai Mujhko Chadhi Hai"	Kalyanji-Anandji	Farooq Kaiser	Mukesh
Kabeela	1080	"Koi Maane Ya Naa Maane"	Kalyanji-Anandji	Farooq Kaiser	solo
Kabhi Kabhie	1081	"Tere Chehre Se Nazar Nahin Hathti"	Khayyam	Sahir Ludhianvi	Lata Mangeshkar
Kabhi Kabhie	1082	"Tera Phoolon Jaisa Rang"	Khayyam	Sahir Ludhianvi	Lata Mangeshkar
Kabhi Kabhie	1083	"Pyaar Kar Liya To Kya"	Khayyam	Sahir Ludhianvi	solo
Kalicharan	1084	"Yeh Pal Chanchal"	Kalyanji-Anandji	Ravindra Jain	Asha Bhosle
Khaan Dost	1085	"Har Saal Humne To Suna Charcha"	Kalyanji-Anandji	Anjaan	Mahendra Kapoor, Anandji
Khaan Dost	1086	"Kahe Ki Dosti Kahe Ki Yaari"	Kalyanji-Anandji	Anjaan	solo
Khalifa	1087	"Dil Machal Raha Hai"	R D Burman	Gulshan Bawra	Asha Bhosle
Khalifa	1088	"Dekh Tujhko Dil Ne Kaha"	R D Burman	Gulshan Bawra	Asha Bhosle
Khalifa	1089	"Tak Dhin Tak" (part 1)	R D Burman	Gulshan Bawra	Manna Dey
Khalifa	1090	"Tak Dhin Tak" (part 2)"	R D Burman	Gulshan Bawra	Manna Dey
Koi Jeeta Koi Haara	1091	"Hamne Har Ek Galat Kaam Kiya"	Laxmikant-Pyarelal	Anand Bakshi	solo
Koi Jeeta Koi Haara	1092	"Bann Gayi Baat Baaton Mein"	Laxmikant-Pyarelal	Anand Bakshi	Asha Bhosle
Koi Jeeta Koi Haara	1093	"Aaj Hum Tum Dono Chup Rahenge"	Laxmikant-Pyarelal	Anand Bakshi	Asha Bhosle
Maa	1094	"O Aisi Koi Baat Jo"	Laxmikant-Pyarelal	Anand Bakshi	Lata Mangeshkar
Maha Chor	1095	"Hindu Hoon Main Na Musalman"	R D Burman	Anand Bakshi	solo
Maha Chor	1096	"Mera Naam Hai Yaaron Maha Chor"	R D Burman	Anand Bakshi	solo
Maha Chor	1097	"Meethi Meethi Akhiyon Se"	R D Burman	Anand Bakshi	Asha Bhosle
Maha Chor	1098	"Main Tumse Pyaar Karti Hoon"	R D Burman	Anand Bakshi	Lata Mangeshkar
Mehbooba	1099	"Mehbooba Mehboob"	R D Burman	Anand Bakshi	solo
Mehbooba	1100	"Mere Naina Saawan Bhadon" (male)	R D Burman	Anand Bakshi	solo
Mehbooba	1101	"Parbat Ke Peechhe"	R D Burman	Anand Bakshi	Lata Mangeshkar
Mera Jiwan	1102	"Mera Jeevan Kuchh Kam Na Aaya"	Sapan-Jagmohan	M G Hashmat	solo
Naagin	1103	"Tera Mera Mera Tera Mil Gaya Dil"	Laxmikant-Pyarelal	Verma Malik	Suman Kalyanpur
Nehle Pe Dehla	1104	"Logon Ki Zubaan Par Apna Naam"	R D Burman	Anand Bakshi	Lata Mangeshkar, Manna Dey
Nehle Pe Dehla	1105	"Saawan Ka Mahina Aa Gaya"	R D Burman	Anand Bakshi	Lata Mangeshkar
Raees	1106	"Duniya Mein Kya Kya Hoti Hai"	Sapan-Jagmohan	Naqsh Lyallpuri	solo
Rangila Ratan	1107	"Dholi Dhol Zorse Bajaa"	Kalyanji-Anandji	Gulshan Bawra	Babban Singh Yadav
Rangila Ratan	1108	"Tum Hi Ho"	Kalyanji-Anandji	Gulshan Bawra	Lata Mangeshkar
Rangila Ratan	1109	"Tera Mera Mera Tera Ho Gaya Faisla"	Kalyanji-Anandji	Gulshan Bawra	Asha Bhosle
Sabse Bada Rupaiya	1110	"Waada Karo Jaanam"	Basu-Manohari	Majrooh Sultanpuri	Lata Mangeshkar
Sabse Bada Rupaiya	1111	"Dariya Kinare Ek Bungla"	Basu-Manohari	Majrooh Sultanpuri	Lata Mangeshkar
Sangram	1112	"Dildar Hamare Dil Ko Tum"	Bappi Lahiri	Gauhar Kanpuri	Mohammed Rafi, Anuradha Paudwal
Sankoch	1113	"Chanchal Mann Teri Chaturayi"	Kalyanji-Anandji	M G Hashmat	solo
Sankoch	1114	"Kaun Raha Hai Kaun Rahega"	Kalyanji-Anandji	M G Hashmat	Asha Bhosle
Sankoch	1115	"Saat Suron Ki Sargam"	Kalyanji-Anandji	M G Hashmat	Asha Bhosle, Keshto Mukherjee
Shankar Shambhu	1116	"Yeh Duniya Hai Naqli Chehron Ka Mela"	Kalyanji-Anandji	Sahir Ludhianvi	Mahendra Kapoor, Sulakshana Pandit
Suntan	1117	"Pappu Ki Mummy"	Laxmikant-Pyarelal	Verma Malik	Asha Bhosle
Tapasya	1118	"Jo Raah Chuni Tune"	Ravindra Jain	M G Hashmat	solo
Tapasya	1119	"Do Panchhi Do Tinke"	Ravindra Jain	M G Hashmat	Aarti Mukherjee
Udhar Ka Sindur	1120	"O Dil Jaani Bol Meri Raani"	Rajesh Roshan	Majrooh Sultanpuri	Anuradha Paudwal
Zamane Se Poocho	1121	"Holi Aai Re"	Sharda	Zafar Gorakhpuri	Mohammed Rafi, Sharda
Zindagi	1122	"Hum Hasane Ko Aye The"	Rajesh Roshan	Manmohan Talkh	solo
Zindagi	1123	"Mamaji O Mamaji"	Rajesh Roshan	Manmohan Talkh	solo
Zindagi	1124	"Umar Pyaar Karne Ki Aayi"	Rajesh Roshan	Amit Khanna	Lata Mangeshkar

==== 1977 ====
Film	No.	Song	Composer(s)	Writer(s)	Co-artist(s)
Adha Din Aadhi Raat	1125	"Yeh Raat Ek Si Hoti Hai" (male)	Laxmikant-Pyarelal	Anand Bakshi	solo
Adha Din Aadhi Raat	1126	"Main London Chhodke Aa Gaya"	Laxmikant-Pyarelal	Anand Bakshi	solo
Aafat	1127	"Oye Laila"	Nitin-Mangesh	Maya Govind	Usha Mangeshkar
Aakhri Goli	1128	"O Daddy Ji"	Kalyanji-Anandji	Verma Malik	Mahendra Kapoor
Aap Ki Khatir	1129	"Seedhi Saadhi Shehzadi"	Bappi Lahiri	Shaily Shailendra	solo
Aashiq Hoon Baharon Ka	1130	"Main Aashiq Hoon Baharon Ka"	Laxmikant-Pyarelal	Anand Bakshi	solo
Aashiq Hoon Baharon Ka	1131	"Tera Dil Kya Kehta Hai"	Laxmikant-Pyarelal	Anand Bakshi	solo
Aashiq Hoon Baharon Ka	1132	"Mashriq Se Jo Aaye"	Laxmikant-Pyarelal	Anand Bakshi	solo
Aashiq Hoon Baharon Ka	1133	"I Am In Love"	Laxmikant-Pyarelal	Anand Bakshi	Lata Mangeshkar
Abhi To Jee Lein	1134	"Jab Ram Naam Le Lein"	Sapan-Jagmohan	Naqsh Lyallpuri	solo
Abhi To Jee Lein	1135	"Na Jaane Agla Pal Hoga Kaisa"	Sapan-Jagmohan	Naqsh Lyallpuri	solo
Abhi To Jee Lein	1136	"Principal Murdabad Management Murdabad"	Sapan-Jagmohan	Naqsh Lyallpuri	solo
Abhi To Jee Lein	1137	"Kayi Gham Sahi Hai Khushi Ke Liye"	Sapan-Jagmohan	Naqsh Lyallpuri	solo
Abhi To Jee Lein	1138	"Tu Laali Hai Saverewali"	Sapan-Jagmohan	Naqsh Lyallpuri	Asha Bhosle
Abhi To Jee Lein	1139	"Kabhi Chali Aa"	Sapan-Jagmohan	Naqsh Lyallpuri	Asha Bhosle
Agent Vinod	1140	"Sabse Nirala Rangila"	Raam Laxman	Ravinder Rawal	solo
Amar Akbar Anthony	1141	"Amar Akbar Anthony"	Laxmikant-Pyarelal	Anand Bakshi	Mahendra Kapoor, Shailendra Singh
Amar Akbar Anthony	1142	"Humko Tumse Ho Gaya Hai Pyaar"	Laxmikant-Pyarelal	Anand Bakshi	Lata Mangeshkar, Mohammed Rafi, Mukesh
Amar Akbar Anthony	1143	"My Name Is Anthony Gonsalves"	Laxmikant-Pyarelal	Anand Bakshi	Amitabh Bachchan
Anand Ashram	1144	"Tere Liye Maine Sabko Chhoda"	Shyamal Mitra	Indeevar	solo
Anand Ashram	1145	"Raahi Naye Naye"	Shyamal Mitra	Indeevar	solo
Anand Ashram	1146	"Sara Pyaar Tumhaara"	Shyamal Mitra	Indeevar	Asha Bhosle
Anurodh	1147	"Aap Ke Anurodh Pe"	Laxmikant-Pyarelal	Anand Bakshi	solo
Anurodh	1148	"Mere Dil Ne Tadap Ke"	Laxmikant-Pyarelal	Anand Bakshi	solo
Anurodh	1149	"Jab Dard Nahin Tha"	Laxmikant-Pyarelal	Anand Bakshi	solo
Anurodh	1150	"Aate Jaate Khubsoorat"	Laxmikant-Pyarelal	Anand Bakshi	solo
Apnapan	1151	"Is Duniya Mein Jeena Hai"	Laxmikant-Pyarelal	Anand Bakshi	Lata Mangeshkar
Apnapan	1152	"Somwar Ko Hum Mile"	Laxmikant-Pyarelal	Anand Bakshi	Sulakshana Pandit
Chaalu Mera Naam	1153	"Are Tumse Hi Is Mehfil Mein Aayi Hai Bahaar"	Kalyanji-Anandji	Verma Malik	Asha Bhosle
Chaalu Mera Naam	1154	"Tu Maan Ya Na Maan"	Kalyanji-Anandji	Verma Malik	Mahendra Kapoor
Chacha Bhatija	1155	"Jeena Zaroori Hai"	Laxmikant-Pyarelal	Anand Bakshi	solo
Chakkar Pe Chakkar	1156	"Kahan Kahan Kis Kis Din"	Kalyanji-Anandji	Verma Malik	Asha Bhosle
Chakkar Pe Chakkar	1157	"Chakkar Pe Chakkar"	Kalyanji-Anandji	Verma Malik	Mohammad Rafi
Chala Murari Hero Banne	1158	"Na Jaane Din Kaise" (part 1)	R. D. Burman	Yogesh	solo
Chala Murari Hero Banne	1159	"Na Janne Din Kaise" (part 2)	R. D. Burman	Yogesh	solo
Chalta Purza	1160	"Aa Gaye Hum Dildaar"	R. D. Burman	Anand Bakshi	Lata Mangeshkar
Chalta Purza	1161	"Bandh Lifafe Mein"	R. D. Burman	Anand Bakshi	Lata Mangeshkar
Chalta Purza	1162	"Baby Ghar Chalo"	R. D. Burman	Anand Bakshi	Sushma Shreshtha
Chandi Sona	1163	"Aap Sa Koi Haseen"	R. D. Burman	Majrooh Sultanpuri	Asha Bhosle
Chandi Sona	1164	"Socha Tha Maine"	R. D. Burman	Majrooh Sultanpuri	Asha Bhosle
Chandi Sona	1165	"Uljhan Hazaar Koi Daale"	R. D. Burman	Majrooh Sultanpuri	Asha Bhosle, Manna Dey
Charandas	1166	"Yeh Zamana Agar Raah Roke"	Rajesh Roshan	Rajendra Krishan	Asha Bhosle
Chhailla Babu	1167	"Kal Raat Sadak Pe"	Laxmikant-Pyarelal	Anand Bakshi	Asha Bhosle
Chhailla Babu	1168	"Humko Nikaloge Saajan"	Laxmikant-Pyarelal	Anand Bakshi	Asha Bhosle
Chhailla Babu	1169	"Yaar Dildaar Tujhe Kaisa Chahiye"	Laxmikant-Pyarelal	Anand Bakshi	Asha Bhosle
Chhailla Babu	1170	"Main Babu Chhaila"	Laxmikant-Pyarelal	Anand Bakshi	solo
Chhailla Babu	1171	"Chhaila Tere Chhaila"	Laxmikant-Pyarelal	Anand Bakshi	solo
Chhota Baap	1172	"Ansuon Ko Thaam Le" (male)	Laxmikant-Pyarelal	Bharat Vyas	solo
Chor Sipahee	1173	"Mujhse Mera Kaam Na Poochho" (happy)	Laxmikant-Pyarelal	Anand Bakshi	solo
Chor Sipahee	1174	"Mujhse Mera Kaam Na Poochho" (sad)	Laxmikant-Pyarelal	Anand Bakshi	solo
Chor Sipahee	1175	"Chor Sipahee Mein Hoti Nahin Dosti"	Laxmikant-Pyarelal	Anand Bakshi	Mohammed Rafi
Darinda	1176	"Ladki Kaahe Ki Bani"	Kalyanji-Anandji	Indeevar	Asha Bhosle
Darinda	1177	"Ankh Mili Nazren Milane Ke Liye"	Kalyanji-Anandji	Indeevar	solo
Darling Darling	1178	"Ek Main Hoon Ek Tu"	R. D. Burman	Anand Bakshi	Asha Bhosle
Darling Darling	1179	"Hello Darling"	R. D. Burman	Anand Bakshi	Asha Bhosle
Darling Darling	1180	"Raat Gayi Baat Gayi"	R. D. Burman	Anand Bakshi	Asha Bhosle
Darling Darling	1181	"Yeh Duniya Kya Hai"	R. D. Burman	Anand Bakshi	R. D. Burman
Darling Darling	1182	"Woh Aurat Hai"	R. D. Burman	Anand Bakshi	solo
Darling Darling	1183	"Aise Na Mujhe Tum Dekho"	R. D. Burman	Anand Bakshi	solo
Dharam Veer	1184	"Hum Banjaron Ki Baat"	Laxmikant-Pyarelal	Anand Bakshi	Lata Mangeshkar
Dildaar	1185	"Main Raja Tu Rani"	Laxmikant-Pyarelal	Anand Bakshi	Asha Bhosle
Dildaar	1186	"Hum Jaise To Dildaar Hote Hain"	Laxmikant-Pyarelal	Anand Bakshi	Asha Bhosle
Dildaar	1187	"Dekho Na Kaise Dara Diya"	Laxmikant-Pyarelal	Anand Bakshi	Asha Bhosle
Dildaar	1188	"Teri Meri Shaadi Seedhi Saadhi"	Laxmikant-Pyarelal	Anand Bakshi	Asha Bhosle
Dildaar	1189	"Hum Jaise To Dildaar Hote Hain (With Dialogue)"	Laxmikant-Pyarelal	Anand Bakshi	Asha Bhosle
Dildaar	1190	"School Mein Kya Padhoge"	Laxmikant-Pyarelal	Anand Bakshi	solo
Doosra Aadmi	1191	"Aao Manayen Jashn-E-Mohabbat"	Rajesh Roshan	Majrooh Sultanpuri	Lata Mangeshkar
Doosra Aadmi	1192	"Aankhon Mein Kaajal Hai"	Rajesh Roshan	Majrooh Sultanpuri	Lata Mangeshkar
Doosra Aadmi	1193	"Nazron Se Keh Do"	Rajesh Roshan	Majrooh Sultanpuri	Lata Mangeshkar
Doosra Aadmi	1194	"Chal Kahin Door Nikal Jayen"	Rajesh Roshan	Majrooh Sultanpuri	Lata Mangeshkar, Mohammed Rafi
Doosra Aadmi	1195	"Jaan Meri Rooth Gayi"	Rajesh Roshan	Majrooh Sultanpuri	Pamela Chopra
Dream Girl	1196	"Hua Kya Agar"	Laxmikant-Pyarelal	Anand Bakshi	Hema Malini
Dream Girl	1197	"Dream Girl"	Laxmikant-Pyarelal	Anand Bakshi	solo
Duniyadari	1198	"Pyaar Karne Se Pehle"	Shankar-Jaikishan	Prabha Thakur	Lata Mangeshkar
Ek Hi Raasta	1199	"Bin Saathi Ke Jeevan Kya"	Rajesh Roshan	Verma Malik	Anuradha Paudwal
Ek Hi Raasta	1200	"Jis Kaam Ko Dono Aaye Hain"	Rajesh Roshan	Verma Malik	Asha Bhosle
Farishta Ya Qatil	1201	"Ishq Mein Tum Toh"	Kalyanji-Anandji	Anjaan	Mohammed Rafi, Usha Mangeshkar, Anuradha Paudwal
Haiwan	1202	"Dekho Yeh Naari Hai"	Bappi Lahiri	Gauhar Kanpuri	solo
Hatyara	1203	"Sone Ka Chabutara"	Kalyanji-Anandji	Vitthalbhai Patel	Lata Mangeshkar
Hira Aur Patthar	1204	"Pyaar Kagaz Pe (Male)"	Kalyanji-Anandji	Anjaan	solo
Hira Aur Patthar	1205	"Tak Tinak Tin"	Kalyanji-Anandji	Anjaan	solo
Hum Kisise Kum Nahin	1206	"Humko To Yaara Teri Yaari"	R. D. Burman	Majrooh Sultanpuri	Asha Bhosle
Hum Kisise Kum Nahin	1207	"Mil Gaya Humko Saathi"	R. D. Burman	Majrooh Sultanpuri	Asha Bhosle
Hum Kisise Kum Nahin	1208	"Bachna Ae Haseeno"	R. D. Burman	Majrooh Sultanpuri	solo
Hum Kisise Kum Nahin	1209	"Aa Dil Kya Hai Mehfil"	R. D. Burman	Majrooh Sultanpuri	solo
Immaan Dharam	1210	"Hum Jhooth Bolte Hai"	Laxmikant-Pyarelal	Anand Bakshi	Mohammad Rafi
Immaan Dharam	1211	"Duniya Ek Adalat Hai"	Laxmikant-Pyarelal	Anand Bakshi	Mohammad Rafi
Inkaar	1212	"Chhodo Yeh Nigaahon Ka Ishara"	Rajesh Roshan	Majrooh Sultanpuri	Asha Bhosle
Jeevan Mukt	1213	"Phoolon Ke Desh Mein"	R. D. Burman	Yogesh	solo
Kachcha Chor	1214	"Kabhi Garibon Se Pyaar Karle"	Laxmikant-Pyarelal	Qamar Jalalabadi	Asha Bhosle
Kalabaaz	1215	"Are Humse Jo Takrayega"	Kalyanji-Anandji	Anand Bakshi	Asha Bhosle
Kalabaaz	1216	"Pyara Pyara Sama Hai"	Kalyanji-Anandji	Anand Bakshi	solo
Kalabaaz	1217	"Are Roothe Hai To"	Kalyanji-Anandji	Anand Bakshi	solo
Kali Raat	1218	"Are Mera Naam Chalta Ram"	Laxmikant-Pyarelal	Anand Bakshi	Asha Bhosle
Karm	1219	"Samay Tu Dheere Dheere Chal"	R D Burman	Indrajit Singh Tulsi	Asha Bhosle
Karm	1220	"Samay Tu Jaldi Jaldi Chal"	R D Burman	Indrajit Singh Tulsi	Asha Bhosle
Karm	1221	"Maine Dekha Tujhe"	R D Burman	Anand Bakshi	Lata Mangeshkar
Kasam Khoon Ki	1222	"O Meri Maina Jaisi Behna" (happy)	Kalyanji-Anandji	Verma Malik	solo
Kasam Khoon Ki	1223	"O Meri Maina Jaisi Behna" (sad)	Kalyanji-Anandji	Verma Malik	solo
Kasam Khoon Ki	1224	"Andar Chale Aao Ji"	Kalyanji-Anandji	Verma Malik	solo
Kasam Khoon Ki	1225	"Jai Janta"	Kalyanji-Anandji	Verma Malik	Mahendra Kapoor
Khel Khilari Ka	1226	"Sabak Padha Hai Jabse"	Kalyanji-Anandji	Rajinder Krishan	Asha Bhosle
Khel Khilari Ka	1227	"Ek Babloo Poochhe"	Kalyanji-Anandji	Rajinder Krishan	Lata Mangeshkar
Khel Kismat Ka	1228	"Chanda Chhode Chandni"	Kalyanji-Anandji	Rajendra Krishan	solo
Khel Kismat Ka	1229	"Hum Tum Jo Rahen"	Kalyanji-Anandji	Rajendra Krishan	Asha Bhosle
Khoon Pasina	1230	"Khoon Pasine Ki"	Kalyanji-Anandji	Anjaan	solo
Khoon Pasina	1231	"Bani Rahe Jodi"	Kalyanji-Anandji	Anjaan	solo
Kinara	1232	"Jaane Kya Sochkar"	R. D. Burman	Gulzar	solo
Ladki Jawan Ho Gayi	1233	"Sun Lo Are Deewano"	Sonik–Omi	Vishweshwar Sharma	Asha Bhosle
Mama Bhanja	1234	"Suno Rani"	Rajesh Roshan	Rajendra Krishan	Lata Mangeshkar
Mandir Masjid	1235	"Chali Aa Dil"	Sharda	Hasrat Jaipuri	Sharda
Mukti	1236	"Main To Chala Peekar"	R. D. Burman	Anand Bakshi	Asha Bhosle
Naami Chor	1237	"Kehte Hain Mujhko Raaja"	Kalyanji-Anandji	Sardar Hairat	solo
Palkon Ki Chhaon Mein	1238	"Daakiyan Daak Laya"	Laxmikant-Pyarelal	Gulzar	Vandana Shastru
Palkon Ki Chhaon Mein	1239	"Ladkhadane Do Mujhe"	Laxmikant-Pyarelal	Gulzar	solo
Palkon Ki Chhaon Mein	1240	"Allah Megh De Paani De"	Laxmikant-Pyarelal	Gulzar	Asha Bhosle
Parvarish	1241	"Bandh Aankh Se Dekh Tamasha"	Laxmikant-Pyarelal	Majrooh Sultanpuri	Amit Kumar
Parvarish	1242	"Hum Premi Prem Karna Jaane"	Laxmikant-Pyarelal	Majrooh Sultanpuri	Mohammed Rafi, Shailendra Singh
Parvarish	1243	"Aiye Shauq Se Kahiye Na"	Laxmikant-Pyarelal	Majrooh Sultanpuri	Asha Bhosle
Phir Janam Lenge Hum	1244	"Phir Janam Lenge Hum" (happy)	Bappi Lahiri	Gauhar Kanpuri	Lata Mangeshkar
Phir Janam Lenge Hum	1245	"Phir Janam Lenge Hum" (sad)	Bappi Lahiri	Gauhar Kanpuri	Lata Mangeshkar
Priyatama	1246	"Main Jo Bolun Haan To Haan"	Rajesh Roshan	Anjaan	Usha Mangeshkar
Priyatama	1247	"Koi Roko Naa Deewane Ko"	Rajesh Roshan	Yogesh	solo
Ram Bharose	1248	"Chalo Bhai Ram Bharose"	Ravindra Jain	Ravindra Jain	solo
Ram Bharose	1249	"Chal Chal Re Kathmandu"	Ravindra Jain	Ravindra Jain, Hasrat Jaipuri	solo
Ram Bharose	1250	"Main Loote Hue Pyaar Ki"	Ravindra Jain	Ravindra Jain, Hasrat Jaipuri	Asha Bhosle
Saheb Bahadur	1251	"Tauba Tauba Tabahi Tabahi"	Madan Mohan	Rajendra Krishan	solo
Saheb Bahadur	1252	"Raat Ko Aayega"	Madan Mohan	Rajendra Krishan	solo
Saheb Bahadur	1253	"Raahi Tha Main Awara"	Madan Mohan	Rajendra Krishan	solo
Saheb Bahadur	1254	"Yeh Pyaar Ka Nasha Hai"	Madan Mohan	Rajendra Krishan	Asha Bhosle
Swami	1255	"Yaadon Mein Woh"	Rajesh Roshan	Amit Khanna	solo
Taxi Taxie	1256	"Jeevan Mein Humsafar Milte To Hain Zaroor"	Hemant Bhosle	Majrooh Sultanpuri	Rama Vij
Taxi Taxie	1257	"Jeevan Mein Humsafar Milte To Hain Zaroor" (sad)	Hemant Bhosle	Majrooh Sultanpuri	solo
Tinku	1258	"Khoche Kurbaan Wai"	Laxmikant-Pyarelal	Anand Bakshi	Rupesh Kumar
Tinku	1259	"Tinku Chala Apne Des Ko"	Laxmikant-Pyarelal	Anand Bakshi	solo
Tyaag	1260	"Aa Mann Pukare"	S. D. Burman	Anand Bakshi	Lata Mangeshkar
Tyaag	1261	"Hum Tum Hain" (version 1)	S. D. Burman	Anand Bakshi	Lata Mangeshkar
Tyaag	1262	"Hum Tum Hain" (version 2)	S. D. Burman	Anand Bakshi	Lata Mangeshkar
Tyaag	1263	"Ek Raja Ka Ek Beta Tha"	S. D. Burman	Anand Bakshi	Sushma Shreshtha
Tyaag	1264	"Kore Kagaz Pe Likhwale"	S. D. Burman	Anand Bakshi	Asha Bhosle
Vishwasghaat	1265	"Hum Dono Ka Mel"	R. D. Burman	Gulshan Bawra	solo
Yaaron Ka Yaar	1266	"Main Yaaron Ka Hoon Yaar"	Kalyanji-Anandji	Verma Malik	solo
Yehi Hai Zindagi	1267	"Pyaar Ka Badla Dekho Mujhe"	Rajesh Roshan	Anand Bakshi	solo
Yehi Hai Zindagi	1268	"Dilruba Aa Meri Bahon Mein"	Rajesh Roshan	Anand Bakshi	Lata Mangeshkar
Zamaanat	1269	"Khile Na Kaagaz (Male)"	Sonik–Omi	Indrajit Singh Tulsi	solo

==== 1978 ====
Film	No.	Song	Composer(s)	Writer(s)	Co-artist(s)
Aahuti	1270	"Kaash Aisa Hota"	Laxmikant-Pyarelal	Anand Bakshi	Lata Mangeshkar
Aahuti	1271	"Naukri Sau Ki"	Laxmikant-Pyarelal	Anand Bakshi	Anuradha Paudwal
Aahuti	1272	"Bharat Ka Bhai Lachhman"	Laxmikant-Pyarelal	Anand Bakshi	Mahendra Kapoor, Manhar Udhas
Aakhri Daku	1273	"Koi Na Koi To"	Kalyanji-Anandji	Indeevar	solo
Aar Paar 2	1274	"Humse Kaa Puchhat"	R. D. Burman	Anand Bakshi	solo
Amar Shakti	1275	"Amar Hai Shakti"	Laxmikant-Pyarelal	Anand Bakshi	Mohammad Rafi, Anuradha Paudwal, Chandrani Mukherjee
Amar Shakti	1276	"Sahebon Hum Aapko Salaam"	Laxmikant-Pyarelal	Anand Bakshi	Asha Bhosle
Anjane Mein	1277	"Gayi Kaam Se Gayi Ye Ladki"	Kalyanji-Anandji	Gulshan Bawra	solo
Anjane Mein	1278	"Main Jaan Gaya Hoon"	Kalyanji-Anandji	Gulshan Bawra	solo
Anjane Mein	1279	"O Meri Jaan Zara Theek Se"	Kalyanji-Anandji	Gulshan Bawra	Asha Bhosle
Anjane Mein	1280	"Dil Ka Rishta Jod Diya Hai"	Kalyanji-Anandji	Gulshan Bawra	Asha Bhosle
Anpadh	1281	"Nagmen Gaao Kaliyan Barsao"	Hemant Bhosle	Majrooh Sultanpuri	solo
Anpadh	1282	"Salamat Raho Tum"	Hemant Bhosle	Majrooh Sultanpuri	Asha Bhosle
Anpadh	1283	"Ghar Ke Andar Ammi Abba"	Hemant Bhosle	Majrooh Sultanpuri	Asha Bhosle
Anpadh	1284	"E Ji Kya Haal Hai"	Hemant Bhosle	Majrooh Sultanpuri	Asha Bhosle
Atithee	1285	"Gaa Ke Jiyo To"	Kalyanji-Anandji	Anjaan	Anuradha Paudwal, Kanchan
Atithee	1286	"Rang Birangi Bazaare"	Kalyanji-Anandji	Verma Malik	Anuradha Paudwal
Atithee	1287	"Kya Karoon Mujhko Time Nahin"	Kalyanji-Anandji	Verma Malik	solo
Atithee	1288	"Dekho Re Dekho"	Kalyanji-Anandji	Verma Malik	Mahendra Kapoor
Azaad	1289	"Jaan Ki Kasam"	R. D. Burman	Anand Bakshi	Lata Mangeshkar
Azaad	1290	"Main Laila Ka Majnu"	R. D. Burman	Anand Bakshi	solo
Azaad	1291	"Raju Chal"	R. D. Burman	Anand Bakshi	solo
Badalte Rishtey	1292	"Gumsum Si Khoi Khoi"	Laxmikant-Pyarelal	Anjaan	Anuradha Paudwal
Badalte Rishtey	1293	"Tum Chuaahe Humko Pasand Na Ho"	Laxmikant-Pyarelal	Anjaan	Suman Kalyanpur
Badalte Rishtey	1294	"Yeh Duniya Ke Badaltey Rishtey"	Laxmikant-Pyarelal	Anjaan	Suman Kalyanpur, Mohammad Rafi
Bade Miyaan	1295	"Sewa Mein Haazir"	R. D. Burman	Majrooh Sultanpuri	solo
Bade Miyaan	1296	"Intezaar Isi Mauke Ka Tha"	R. D. Burman	Majrooh Sultanpuri	Asha Bhosle
Bahadur Jis Kaa Naam	1297	"Tum Apne Aapko Kya Samajhti Ho"	Kalyanji-Anandji	Rajendra Krishan	solo
Bahadur Jis Kaa Naam	1298	"Atma Parmatma"	Kalyanji-Anandji	Rajendra Krishan	Mahendra Kapoor
Band Leader	1299	"Main Husn Ka Parwana Hoon"	Kishore Kumar	N/A	solo
Band Leader	1300	"Qareeb Aaja"	Kishore Kumar	N/A	solo
Band Leader	1301	"Main Hoon Master Chick Chick Boom Boom"	Kishore Kumar	N/A	solo
Bandie	1302	"Jise Yaar Ka Sachcha Pyaar Mile"	Shyamal Mitra	Indeevar	Sulakshana Pandit
Bandie	1303	"Range Na Man Rang Mein"	Shyamal Mitra	Indeevar	Asha Bhosle
Bandie	1304	"Haath Mein Jaam Na Loon"	Shyamal Mitra	Indeevar	solo
Bebus	1305	"Pyaar Jab Kiya To"	R. D. Burman	Anand Bakshi	Asha Bhosle
Bhola Bhala	1306	"Dheere Dheere Naach Ro Jogan"	R. D. Burman	Anand Bakshi	solo
Bhola Bhala	1307	"Main Bhola Bhala Hoon"	R. D. Burman	Anand Bakshi	solo
Bhola Bhala	1308	"Waqt Waqt Ki Baat"	R. D. Burman	Anand Bakshi	solo
Bhola Bhala	1309	"Jhuk Gayi Aankhen Teri"	R. D. Burman	Anand Bakshi	Lata Mangeshkar
Chakravyha	1310	"Shaadi Karne Se Pyaar"	Laxmikant-Pyarelal	Anand Bakshi	Asha Bhosle
Chor Ho To Aisa	1311	"Masti Mein Baithke"	R. D. Burman	Majrooh Sultanpuri	Hemant Kumar, Asha Bhosle
College Girl	1312	"College Girl I Love You"	Bappi Lahiri	Shiv Kumar Saroj	solo
College Girl	1313	"Pyaar Maanga Hai Tumhi Se"	Bappi Lahiri	Shiv Kumar Saroj	solo
Daan Dahej	1314	"Dulha Dulhan Ka Joda"	N/A	N/A	Usha Mangeshkar
Daan Dahej	1315	"Jab Se Dil"	N/A	N/A	Asha Bhosle
Daaku Aur Jawan	1316	"Rakh Di Hai Beech Sadak Mein"	Laxmikant-Pyarelal	Anand Bakshi	Asha Bhosle
Des Pardes	1317	"Yeh Des Pardes"	Rajesh Roshan	Amit Khanna	solo
Des Pardes	1318	"Tu Pee Aur Jee"	Rajesh Roshan	Amit Khanna	solo
Des Pardes	1319	"Nazrana Bheja Kisine Pyar Ka"	Rajesh Roshan	Amit Khanna	solo
Des Pardes	1320	"Jaisa Des Waisa Bhes"	Rajesh Roshan	Amit Khanna	Amit Kumar, Vijay Benedict, Manhar Udhas
Des Pardes	1321	"Nazar Lage Naa Sathiyo"	Rajesh Roshan	Amit Khanna	Lata Mangeshkar
Devata	1322	"Gulmohar Gar Tumhara Naam"	R. D. Burman	Gulzar	Lata Mangeshkar
Devata	1323	"Chand Churake Laya Hoon"	R. D. Burman	Gulzar	Lata Mangeshkar
Dil Aur Deewar	1324	"Dheere Dheere Haule Haule"	Laxmikant-Pyarelal	Anand Bakshi	Lata Mangeshkar
Dil Aur Deewar	1325	"Mujhse Poochhe Mere Meet"	Laxmikant-Pyarelal	Anand Bakshi	solo
Dil Se Mile Dil	1326	"Yeh Naina Yeh Kaajal"	Bappi Lahiri	Amit Khanna	solo
Dil Se Mile Dil	1327	"Dil Se Mile Dil" (part 1)	Bappi Lahiri	Amit Khanna	solo
Dil Se Mile Dil	1328	"Dil Se Mile Dil" (Part 2)	Bappi Lahiri	Amit Khanna	solo
Dillagi	1329	"Rangrejwa Tu Rang Aisi"	Rajesh Roshan	Yogesh	Suman Kalyanpur
Do Musafir	1330	"Kaise Raat Beeti"	Kalyanji-Anandji	M. G. Hashmat	solo
Do Musafir	1331	"Tere Jaisa Saagar Mein" (sad)	Kalyanji-Anandji	M. G. Hashmat	solo
Do Musafir	1332	"Tere Jaisa Saagar Mein" (happy)	Kalyanji-Anandji	M. G. Hashmat	Anuradha Paudwal
Don	1333	"Main Hoon Don"	Kalyanji-Anandji	Anjaan	solo
Don	1334	"Yeh Hai Bombay Nagaria"	Kalyanji-Anandji	Anjaan	solo
Don	1335	"Khaike Pan Banaraswala"	Kalyanji-Anandji	Anjaan	solo
Don	1336	"Jiska Mujhe Tha Intezar"	Kalyanji-Anandji	Anjaan	Lata Mangeshkar
Ek Baap Chhe Bete	1337	"Ek Baap Aur Chhe Bete"	Rajesh Roshan	Majrooh Sultanpuri	solo
Ek Baap Chhe Bete	1338	"Daddy Don't Go"	Rajesh Roshan	Majrooh Sultanpuri	solo
Ganga Ki Saugandh	1339	"Roop Jab Aisa Mila"	Kalyanji-Anandji	Anjaan	solo
Ganga Ki Saugandh	1340	"Aankh Ladi Humse (Duet)"	Kalyanji-Anandji	Anjaan	Asha Bhosle
Ghar	1341	"Phir Wohi Raat Hai"	R. D. Burman	Gulzar	solo
Ghar	1342	"Aap Ki Aankhon Mein"	R. D. Burman	Gulzar	Lata Mangeshkar
Giraftar	1343	"Mil Jhul Ke Gaate"	R. D. Burman	Gulshan Bawra	Mohammad Rafi
Hamdard	1344	"Yeh Bheegi Bheegi Raat Na Hoti"	N/A	N/A	solo
Hanste Rehna	1345	"Yaaro Chhodo Yeh Saare Gham"	N/A	N/A	solo
Heeralal Pannalal	1346	"Main Dhal Gayi Rang Mein Tere"	R. D. Burman	Majrooh Sultanpuri	Asha Bhosle
Heeralal Pannalal	1347	"Kahiye Kahan Se Aana Hua"	R. D. Burman	Majrooh Sultanpuri	Lata Mangeshkar, Asha Bhosle, Bhupinder Singh
Heeralal Pannalal	1348	"O Padosan Ki Ladki"	R. D. Burman	Verma Malik	solo
Heeralal Pannalal	1349	"Seedhe Raste Chaloge Toh"	R. D. Burman	Verma Malik	Mohammad Rafi
Jalan	1350	"Goron Pe Na Mar"	Madan Mohan	Indeevar	Libi Rana
Jamuna Ke Teer	1351	"Jamuna Ke Teer Radhe"	N/A	N/A	solo
Jeb Tumhari Haath Hamara	1352	"Jam Ke Zara"	Kalyanji-Anandji	N/A	Mahendra Kapoor, Kanchan
Karmayogi	1353	"Tum Nahin Ya Hum Nahin"	Kalyanji-Anandji	Verma Malik	Mohammad Rafi, Asha Bhosle
Kasme Vaade	1354	"Mile Jo Kadi Kadi"	R. D. Burman	Gulshan Bawra	Mohammad Rafi, Asha Bhosle
Kasme Vaade	1355	"Aati Rahengi Baharen" (happy)	R. D. Burman	Gulshan Bawra	Asha Bhosle, Amit Kumar
Kasme Vaade	1356	"Kasme Vaade Nibhayenge Hum" (part 1)	R. D. Burman	Gulshan Bawra	Lata Mangeshkar
Kasme Vaade	1357	"Kasme Vaade Nibhayenge Hum" (part 2)	R. D. Burman	Gulshan Bawra	Lata Mangeshkar
Kharidaar	1358	"Chandi Ki Chamak Se"	R. D. Burman	Gulshan Bawra	solo
Khatta Meetha	1359	"Thoda Hai Thode Ki Zaroorat Hai"	Rajesh Roshan	Gulzar	Lata Mangeshkar
Khatta Meetha	1360	"Tumse Mila Tha Pyar"	Rajesh Roshan	Gulzar	Lata Mangeshkar
Khatta Meetha	1361	"Ye Jeena Hai Angur Ka Dana"	Rajesh Roshan	Gulzar	Usha Mangeshkar
Khatta Meetha	1362	"Mummy O Mummy, Tu Kabb Saas Banegi"	Rajesh Roshan	Gulzar	solo
Khatta Meetha	1363	"Roll Roll"	Rajesh Roshan	Gulzar	Amit Kumar
Khoon Ki Pukaar	1364	"O Jaane Jaana"	Bappi Lahiri	Hasrat Jaipuri	Lata Mangeshkar
Khoon Ki Pukaar	1365	"Aankhon Mein To Hai Pyaar Ki Barsaat"	Bappi Lahiri	Gauhar Kanpuri	solo
Lal Kothi	1366	"Kya Kahoon Kaun Hoon Main"	Sapan-Jagmohan	Naqsh Lyallpuri	solo
Lal Kothi	1367	"Kya Kahoon Kaun Hoon Main (Sad)"	Sapan-Jagmohan	Naqsh Lyallpuri	solo
Mr. Hasmukh	1368	"Jo Hoga Dekha Jaayega"	R. D. Burman	Anand Bakshi	Asha Bhosle
Muqaddar	1369	"Teri Chehre Se Parda Na Hataana"	Rajesh Roshan	Anjaan	Mohammed Rafi
Muqaddar	1370	"Ho Teri Thumri"	Rajesh Roshan	Anjaan	Asha Bhosle
Muqaddar	1371	"Suraj Su Aankhen Mila"	Rajesh Roshan	Anjaan	Asha Bhosle, Mohammad Rafi
Muqaddar Ka Sikandar	1372	"Rote Huye Aate Hain Sab"	Kalyanji-Anandji	Anjaan	solo
Muqaddar Ka Sikandar	1373	"O Saathi Re" (male)	Kalyanji-Anandji	Anjaan	solo
Muqaddar Ka Sikandar	1374	"Salaam-e-Ishq Meri Jaan"	Kalyanji-Anandji	Anjaan	Lata Mangeshkar
Nageena	1375	"Tere Mere Pyaar Ka Andaz"	Shankar-Jaikishan	Hasrat Jaipuri	Asha Bhosle
Nasbandi	1376	"Kahan Gayi Woh Teri Ahinsa"	Kalyanji-Anandji	Indeevar	solo
Naukri	1377	"Duniya Mein Jeene Ka"	R. D. Burman	Anand Bakshi	Manna Dey
Naya Daur	1378	"O Paise Wale"	R. D. Burman	Anand Bakshi	solo
Naya Daur	1379	"Paani Ke Badle Peekar Sharab"	R. D. Burman	Anand Bakshi	Danny Denzongpa
Naya Daur	1380	"Chalo Kahin Aur Chale"	R. D. Burman	Anand Bakshi	Asha Bhosle
Pati Patni Aur Woh	1381	"Na Aaj Tha"	Ravindra Jain	Anand Bakshi	solo
Phandebaaz	1382	"Abhi Gyarah Nahin Baaje"	R. D. Burman	Anand Bakshi	solo
Phool Khile Hain Gulshan Gulshan	1383	"Mannu Bhai Motor Chali"	Laxmikant-Pyarelal	Rajendra Krishan	Mehmood
Phool Khile Hain Gulshan Gulshan	1384	"Duniya Mein Sabse Haseen"	Laxmikant-Pyarelal	Rajendra Krishan	solo
Phool Khile Hain Gulshan Gulshan	1385	"Kaisa Parda Hai"	Laxmikant-Pyarelal	Rajendra Krishan	solo
Samapan	1386	"Jeevan Naiya Mein"	N/A	N/A	solo
Sangeet	1387	"Main Aa Gaya Hoon"	N/A	N/A	Lata Mangeshkar
Saawan Ke Geet	1388	"Ho Gaya Re Yeh Sawan Bairi"	Laxmikant-Pyarelal	Majrooh Sultanpuri	solo
Saawan Ke Geet	1389	"Tumse Milke Dilbar Yaar"	Laxmikant-Pyarelal	Majrooh Sultanpuri	Lata Mangeshkar
Shalimar	1390	"Hum Bewafa Hargiz Na The" (happy)	R. D. Burman	Anand Bakshi	solo
Shalimar	1391	"Hum Bewafa Hargiz Na The" (sad)	R. D. Burman	Anand Bakshi	solo
Swarg Narak	1392	"Leena O Leena"	Rajesh Roshan	Anand Bakshi	solo
Swarg Narak	1393	"Nahin Nahin Koi Tumsa Nahin"	Rajesh Roshan	Anand Bakshi	Asha Bhosle
Titli	1394	"Mehbooba Mehbooba"	N/A	N/A	solo
Toote Khilone	1395	"Nanha Sa Panchhi Re Tu" (happy)	Bappi Lahiri	Kaifi Azmi	solo
Toote Khilone	1396	"Nanha Sa Panchhi Re Tu" (sad)	Bappi Lahiri	Kaifi Azmi	solo
Trishna	1397	"Jeevan Ki Sargam"	Kalyanji-Anandji	Indeevar	solo
Trishul	1398	"Jo Ho Yaar Apna"	Khayyam	Sahir Ludhianvi	Lata Mangeshkar
Trishul	1399	"Jaaneman Tum Kamaal Karti Ho"	Khayyam	Sahir Ludhianvi	Lata Mangeshkar
Trishul	1400	"Mohabbat Bade Kaam Ki Cheez"	Khayyam	Sahir Ludhianvi	Lata Mangeshkar, K. J. Yesudas
Trishul	1401	"Jaa Ri Behna Jaa"	Khayyam	Sahir Ludhianvi	K. J. Yesudas, Pamela Chopra
Tumhari Kasam	1402	"Main Husn Ka Hoon Deewana"	Rajesh Roshan	Anand Bakshi	solo
Tumhari Kasam	1403	"Ae Ladki Pyaar Karegi" (version 1)	Rajesh Roshan	Anand Bakshi	Lata Mangeshkar
Tumhari Kasam	1404	"Ae Ladki Pyaar Karegi" (version 2)	Rajesh Roshan	Anand Bakshi	Lata Mangeshkar
Vishwanath	1405	"Jab Jab Jo Jo Hona Hai"	Rajesh Roshan	Vitalbhai Patel	solo
Vishwanath	1406	"Duniya Ne Mujhe Tadpaya Hai"	Rajesh Roshan	Anjaan	Lata Mangeshkar
Waapsi	1407	"Pyaar Ka Tohfa Laaya"	R. D. Burman	N/A	solo
Yasmeen	1408	"Aa Humsafar Pyaar Ki Sej Par"	Basu-Manohari	Yogesh	Lata Mangeshkar

==== 1979 ====
Film	No.	Song	Composer(s)	Writer(s)	Co-artist(s)
Aaj Ki Radha	1409	"Yeh Mehfil Yunhi Sajegi"	Sapan-Jagmohan	Indeevar	solo
Aangan Ki Kali	1410	"Na Ronaa Munni" (part 1)	Bappi Lahiri	Shaily Shailendra	solo
Aangan Ki Kali	1411	"Na Ronaa Munni" (part 2)	Bappi Lahiri	Shaily Shailendra	solo
Ahsaas	1412	"Sapno Ke Shehar Hum Banayenge"	Bappi Lahiri	Ravindra Peepat	solo
Ahsaas	1413	"Kitne Raanjhe Tujhe Dekhke"	Bappi Lahiri	Indeevar	solo
Ahsaas	1414	"Saare Zamaane Chhod Chale"	Bappi Lahiri	Indeevar	Shailendra Singh
Ahsaas	1415	"Jo Na Chhote Hain Na Bade"	Bappi Lahiri	Indeevar	Shailendra Singh
Amar Deep	1416	"Koi Na Tere Pehle Thi"	Laxmikant-Pyarelal	Anand Bakshi	solo
Amar Deep	1417	"Tum Nahin Maanoge"	Laxmikant-Pyarelal	Anand Bakshi	Anuradha Paudwal
Amar Deep	1418	"Halki Si Kasak Masak"	Laxmikant-Pyarelal	Anand Bakshi	Lata Mangeshkar
Atmaram	1419	"Apni Aatma Se Poochho"	Shankar-Jaikishan	Vishweshwar Sharma	Usha Mangeshkar, Sulakshana Pandit
Atmaram	1420	"Chalte Chalte In Raahon Par"	Shankar-Jaikishan	Prabha Thakur	solo
Aur Kaun?	1421	"Haan Pehli Baar"	Bappi Lahiri	Amit Khanna	solo
Baaton Baaton Mein	1422	Kahan Tak Yeh Man Ko"	Rajesh Roshan	Amit Khanna	solo
Baaton Baaton Mein	1423	"Suniye Kahiye, Kahiye Suniye"	Rajesh Roshan	Amit Khanna	Asha Bhosle
Bagula Bhagat	1424	"Mehfil Me Meri Aaye Hai"	Kalyanji-Anandji	Anjaan	Asha Bhosle
Bagula Bhagat	1425	"Bum Bhole Ke Bhakton Ko"	Kalyanji-Anandji	Anjaan	Mahendra Kapoor
Bagula Bhagat	1426	"Barson Beete Yunhi"	Kalyanji-Anandji	Anjaan	Amit Kumar
Bhala Maanus	1427	"Jaan Pehchan Toh Pehle Se Thi"	R D Burman	Gulshan Bawra	Asha Bhosle
Bin Phere Hum Tere	1428	"Bin Phere Hum Tere"	Usha Khanna	Indeevar	solo
Bombay by Nite	1429	"Dheere Dheere Dheere"	Iqbal Qureshi	Upendra	Sulakshana Pandit
Dhongee	1430	"Haye Re Haye Tera Ghongta"	R. D. Burman	Anand Bakshi	Asha Bhosle
Dhongee	1431	"Wahan Chalo Jis Jagah"	R. D. Burman	Anand Bakshi	Asha Bhosle
Dhongee	1432	"Pyara Sa Tera Mukhda"	R. D. Burman	Anand Bakshi	solo
Dhongee	1433	"Rangon Ki Chhanv Dhoop Mein"	R. D. Burman	Anand Bakshi	Asha Bhonsle and Amit Kumar
Do Hawaldar	1434	"Bhadak Uthi Hai Dil Mein"	Bappi Lahiri	Shaily Shailendra	solo
Do Shikaari	1435	"Aaja Gori Dil Mein"	Chitragupta	Jan Nisar Akhtar	solo
Duniya Meri Jeb Mein	1436	"Sari Ki Sari Yeh Duniya"	Rajesh Roshan	Gulshan Bawra	Asha Bhosle
Duniya Meri Jeb Mein	1437	"Kuch Sochoon Haan Sochoon"	Rajesh Roshan	Gulshan Bawra	Asha Bhosle
Duniya Meri Jeb Mein	1438	"Tere Jaisa Bhai Sabko Mile" (happy)	Rajesh Roshan	Gulshan Bawra	Mohammad Rafi
Duniya Meri Jeb Mein	1439	"Tere Jaisa Bhai Sabko Mile" (sad)	Rajesh Roshan	Gulshan Bawra	Mohammad Rafi
Ganga Aur Geeta	1440	"Main Aag Hoon"	Shankar-Jaikishan	Vitthalbhai Patel	solo
Gautam Govinda	1441	"Ek Ritu Aaye"	Laxmikant-Pyarelal	Anand Bakshi	solo
Gol Maal	1442	"Ek Din Sapnon Mein Dekha"	R D Burman	Gulzar	Amit Kumar
Gol Maal	1443	"Aanewala Pal Jaanewala Hai"	R D Burman	Gulzar	solo
Habari	1444	"Tu Hai Mere Khuda Ka Kamaal"	Sapan-Jagmohan	M G Hashmat	Asha Bhosle
Hamare Tumhare	1445	"Hum Aur Tum The Saathi" (part 1)	R. D. Burman	Yogesh	solo
Hamare Tumhare	1446	"Hum Aur Tum The Saathi" (part 2)	R. D. Burman	Yogesh	solo
Hamare Tumhare	1447	"Jaadoo Dar Gayo Re Mo Pe"	R. D. Burman	Yogesh	solo
Hamare Tumhare	1448	"Aa Ha Haa Naino Ke Who"	R. D. Burman	Yogesh	solo
Hamare Tumhare	1449	"Kuch Tum Karo"	R. D. Burman	Yogesh	Lata Mangeshkar
Hamare Tumhare	1450	"Achcha Chalo Ji Baba"	R. D. Burman	Yogesh	Usha Mangeshkar
Hamare Tumhare	1451	"Maaf Kar Do"	R. D. Burman	Yogesh	Usha Mangeshkar
Hum Tere Aashiq Hain	1452	"Maanavata Ki Jeet Hui"	Ravindra Jain	Sahir Ludhianvi	solo
Hum Tere Aashiq Hain	1453	"Maar Liya Maidan"	Ravindra Jain	Sahir Ludhianvi	Asha Bhosle
Jaan-e-Bahaar	1454	"Main Hoon Rahi Mastana"	Bappi Lahiri	Gauhar Kanpuri	solo
Jaandaar	1455	"Gokul Ki Galiyon Ka Nandlala"	Kalyanji-Anandji	Rajendra Krishan	solo
Jaani Dushman	1456	"O Meri Jaan"	Laxmikant-Pyarelal	Verma Malik	Anuradha Paudwal
Jaani Dushman	1457	"Are Sun Bhai"	Laxmikant-Pyarelal	Verma Malik	Asha Bhosle, Mahendra Kapoor
Jhoota Kahin Ka	1458	"Dil Mein Jo Mere Sama Gayi"	R D Burman	Gulshan Bawra	Rishi Kapoor
Jhoota Kahin Ka	1459	"Barah Baje Ki Suiyon Jaise"	R D Burman	Gulshan Bawra	Asha Bhosle
Jhoota Kahin Ka	1460	"Jeevan Ke Har Mod Par"	R D Burman	Gulshan Bawra	Asha Bhosle
Kaala Patthar	1461	"Ik Raasta Hai Zindagi"	Rajesh Roshan	Sahir Ludhianvi	solo
Khandaan	1462	"Basti Ke Logon Mein"	Khayyam	Naqsh Lyallpuri	solo
Khandaan	1463	"Yaaro Aao Khushi Manao"	Khayyam	Naqsh Lyallpuri	solo
Lahu Ke Do Rang	1464	"Muskurata Hua Gul Khilata Hua"	Bappi Lahiri	Farooq Kaiser	solo
Lahu Ke Do Rang	1465	"Chahiye Thoda Pyaar"	Bappi Lahiri	Farooq Kaiser	solo
Lahu Ke Do Rang	1466	Masti Mein Nikli"	Bappi Lahiri	Farooq Kaiser	Sulakshana Pandit
Lok Parlok	1467	"Aise Nacho Aise Gaao"	Laxmikant-Pyarelal	Anand Bakshi	solo
Lok Parlok	1468	"Yeh Kehdo Yamraaj Se"	Laxmikant-Pyarelal	Anand Bakshi	solo
Lok Parlok	1469	"Amma Ri Amma"	Laxmikant-Pyarelal	Anand Bakshi	Asha Bhosle
Lok Parlok	1470	"Hum Tum Jeet Gaye"	Laxmikant-Pyarelal	Anand Bakshi	Asha Bhosle
Lok Parlok	1471	"Badal Kab Barsoge"	Laxmikant-Pyarelal	Anand Bakshi	Asha Bhosle
Magroor	1472	"Hum Mohabbat Mein"	Laxmikant-Pyarelal	Anand Bakshi	Suman Kalyanpur
Manzil	1373	"Tum Ho Mere Dil Ki Dhadkan"	R. D. Burman	Yogesh	solo
Manzil	1374	"Rimjhim Gire Saawan" (male)	R. D. Burman	Yogesh	solo
Meri Dosti Tera Pyaar	1475	"Bhadakti Aag Hai Dil Mein"	Mahesh-Naresh	Prakash Pankaj	solo
Mr. Natwarlal	1476	"Pardesiya Yeh Sach Hai Piya"	Rajesh Roshan	Anand Bakshi	Lata Mangeshkar
Muqabla	1477	"Meri Roos Gayi"	Laxmikant-Pyarelal	Verma Malik	Asha Bhosle
Muqabla	1478	"Teen Batti Wala Govinda Aala"	Laxmikant-Pyarelal	Verma Malik	Mohammad Rafi
Nalayak	1479	"Dekho Shor Na Machana"	Kalyanji-Anandji	Verma Malik	solo
Nalayak	1480	"Yeh Zindagi Ek Jua"	Kalyanji-Anandji	Verma Malik	solo
Nauker	1481	"Chandni Re Jhoom" (male)	R D Burman	Majrooh Sultanpuri	solo
Nauker	1482	"Pallu Latke"	R D Burman	Majrooh Sultanpuri	Asha Bhosle
Prem Bandhan	1483	"Main Tere Pyaar Mein Paagal"	Laxmikant-Pyarelal	Anand Bakshi	Lata Mangeshkar
Prem Bandhan	1484	"Hoti Hai Kisise Jab Preet"	Laxmikant-Pyarelal	Anand Bakshi	Asha Bhosle
Prem Vivah	1485	"Milte Rahiye"	Laxmikant-Pyarelal	Anand Bakshi	Amit Kumar
Ratnadeep	1486	"Kabhi Kabhi Sapna Lagta Hai"	R D Burman	Gulzar	Asha Bhosle
Salaam Memsaab	1487	"Janewale Sunta Jaa"	R. D. Burman	Majrooh Sultanpuri	solo
Salaam Memsaab	1488	"Hum Bhi Rahon Mein Khade" (male)	R. D. Burman	Majrooh Sultanpuri	solo
Salaam Memsaab	1489	"Hum Bhi Rahon Mein Khade" (female)	R. D. Burman	Majrooh Sultanpuri	Lata Mangeshkar
Shabhash Daddy	1490	"O Meri Jaane Jaan"	Kishore Kumar	Irshad	Asha Bhosle
Shabhash Daddy	1491	"Pyaar Aur Shaadi"	Kishore Kumar	Gulshan Bawra	Amit Kumar
Shabhash Daddy	1492	"Maine Jo Dil Diya"	Kishore Kumar	Kishore Kumar	Yogeeta Bali
Surakksha	1493	"Yeh Duniya Hai Usi Ki"	Bappi Lahiri	Ramesh Pant	Usha Mangeshkar, Manna Dey
Surakksha	1494	"Maine Pyaar Kiya Toh Theek Kiya"	Bappi Lahiri	Ramesh Pant	solo
The Great Gambler	1495	"Pehle Pehle Pyaar Ki Mulaqaten"	R D Burman	Anand Bakshi	Asha Bhosle
Yuvraaj	1496	"Mere Yaaron Zara Munh Udhar Pher Lo"	Laxmikant-Pyarelal	Anand Bakshi	Asha Bhosle

=== 1980s ===
==== 1980 ====
Film	No.	Song	Composer(s)	Writer(s)	Co-artist(s)
Aanchal	1497	"Lanka Chale Ramji"	R. D. Burman	Majrooh Sultanpuri	Sapan Chakraborty
Aanchal	1498	"Aisa Rangeen Sama"	R. D. Burman	Majrooh Sultanpuri	solo
Aanchal	1499	"Paise Ka Kaajal"	R. D. Burman	Majrooh Sultanpuri	Asha Bhosle
Aanchal	1500	"Bas Meri Jaan"	R. D. Burman	Majrooh Sultanpuri	Lata Mangeshkar
Aap Ke Deewane	1501	"Hum To Aapke Deewane"	Rajesh Roshan	Anand Bakshi	Amit Kumar, Mohammed Rafi
Aap Ke Deewane	1502	"Mere Dil Mein Jo Hota Hai"	Rajesh Roshan	Anand Bakshi	Mohammed Rafi, Lata Mangeshkar
Aap Ke Deewane	1503	"Tera Jalwa Tauba"	Rajesh Roshan	Anand Bakshi	Mohammad Rafi
Aap Ke Deewane	1504	"Tumko Khush Dekh Kar"	Rajesh Roshan	Anand Bakshi	Mohammad Rafi
Aap To Aise Na The	1505	"Khuda Hi Juda Kare"	Usha Khanna	Indeevar	Mohammad Rafi
Abdullah	1506	"Ae Khuda Har Faisla"	R. D. Burman	Anand Bakshi	R. D. Burman
Agent 009	1507	"Aag Laga Di Pani Mein"	Sonik-Omi	Verma Malik	solo
Alibaba Aur Chalis Chor	1508	"Jaadugar Jaadu Kar Jaayega"	R. D. Burman	Anand Bakshi	Asha Bhosle
Apne Paraye	1509	"Kaise Din Jeevan Mein Aaye"	Bappi Lahiri	Yogesh	solo
Bambai Ka Maharaja	1510	"Bum Bum Bhole"	Usha Khanna	Anjaan	solo
Bambai Ka Maharaja	1511	"Tu Jahan Jaayegi"	Usha Khanna	Anjaan	solo
Bambai Ka Maharaja	1512	"Aayega Re Aayega"	Usha Khanna	Anjaan	solo
Bandish	1513	"Rang Bhare Mausam Se"	Laxmikant-Pyarelal	Anand Bakshi	Asha Bhosle
Bandish	1514	"Are Bhaago Are Dauro"	Laxmikant-Pyarelal	Anand Bakshi	Asha Bhosle
Bandish	1515	"Mera Hosh Le Lo"	Laxmikant-Pyarelal	Anand Bakshi	Asha Bhosle
Beqasoor	1516	"Pyar Ko Pyar Ki Roshni Mil Gayi"	Bappi Lahiri	Nida Fazli	solo
Bombay 405 Miles	1517	"Are De De Zara"	Kalyanji-Anandji	Indeevar	Mahendra Kapoor
Bombay 405 Miles	1518	"Kasam Na Lo Koi Humse"	Kalyanji-Anandji	Indeevar	Asha Bhosle
Choron Ki Baaraat	1519	"Teri Meri Dosti Ho Gayi"	Laxmikant-Pyarelal	Anand Bakshi	Lata Mangeshkar
Chunaoti	1520	"Mehfil Mein Paimana"	Laxmikant-Pyarelal	Verma Malik	Suman Kalyanpur
Desh Drohi	1521	"Marne Se Nahi Darte"	Kalyanji-Anandji	Gulshan Bawra	solo
Desh Drohi	1522	"Holi Khelat Nandlal"	Kalyanji-Anandji	Gulshan Bawra	Asha Bhosle, Mahendra Kapoor
Dhan Daulat	1523	"Jeena Kya Aji Pyaar Bina"	R. D. Burman	Majrooh Sultanpuri	Asha Bhosle
Dhan Daulat	1524	"Ho Jaaye Phir"	R. D. Burman	Majrooh Sultanpuri	Asha Bhosle
Dhan Daulat	1525	"Woh Jinki Nayi Hai Duniya"	R. D. Burman	Majrooh Sultanpuri	Asha Bhosle
Dhan Daulat	1526	"Khudkhushi Karne Ja"	R. D. Burman	Majrooh Sultanpuri	Master Raju
Do Aur Do Paanch	1527	"Meri Zindagi Ne Mujhpe Ehsaan"	Rajesh Roshan	Anjaan	solo
Do Aur Do Paanch	1528	"Tune Abhi Dekha Nahin"	Rajesh Roshan	Anjaan	solo
Do Aur Do Paanch	1529	"Prem Se Hunko Jeene Do"	Rajesh Roshan	Anjaan	Lata Mangeshkar, Amit Kumar, Mehmood
Do Aur Do Paanch	1530	"Soti Hai Ye Raat"	Rajesh Roshan	Anjaan	Anuradha Paudwal
Do Premee	1531	"Prem Ka Rog Laga"	Laxmikant-Pyarelal	Anand Bakshi	solo
Do Premee	1532	"Mubarak Ho"	Laxmikant-Pyarelal	Anand Bakshi	Manna Dey
Dostana	1533	"Salamat Rahe Dostana Hamara" (part 1)	Laxmikant-Pyarelal	Anand Bakshi	Mohammad Rafi
Dostana	1534	"Salamat Rahe Dostana Hamara" (part 2)	Laxmikant-Pyarelal	Anand Bakshi	Mohammad Rafi
Dostana	1535	"Dillagi Ne Di Hawa"	Laxmikant-Pyarelal	Anand Bakshi	Asha Bhosle
Dostana	1536	"Bahut Khubsoorat Jawan Ek Ladki"	Laxmikant-Pyarelal	Anand Bakshi	solo
Garam Khoon	1537	"Tu Jahan Main Wahan"	Shankar-Jaikishan	Hasrat Jaipuri	solo
Gunehgaar	1538	"Char Dinon Ki HaibYeh Zindagi"	R. D. Burman	Gulshan Bawra	R. D. Burman, Asha Bhosle, Bhupinder Singh
Hum Nahin Sudhrenge	1539	"Machhua Ho Machhua"	Ravindra Jain	Ravindra Jain	Asha Bhosle
Hum Nahin Sudhrenge	1540	"Rani O Rani"	Ravindra Jain	Ravindra Jain	Asha Bhosle
Hum Paanch	1541	"Aati Hai Palki Sarkar Ki"	Laxmikant-Pyarelal	Anand Bakshi	Mahendra Kapoor
Judaai	1542	"Saamne Aa Dekhe Zamana"	Laxmikant-Pyarelal	Anand Bakshi	Asha Bhosle
Judaai	1543	"Maar Gayi Mujhe Teri Judaai"	Laxmikant-Pyarelal	Anand Bakshi	Asha Bhosle
Judaai	1544	"Bansi Bajao Bansi Bajaiya"	Laxmikant-Pyarelal	Anand Bakshi	Anuradha Paudwal
Jyoti Bane Jwala	1545	"Main Jogan Hoon Tu Jogi"	Laxmikant-Pyarelal	Anand Bakshi	Asha Bhosle
Jyoti Bane Jwala	1546	"Dil Dhadak Raha Hai"	Laxmikant-Pyarelal	Anand Bakshi	Mohammad Rafi, Lata Mangeshkar
Jwalamukhi	1547	"Hum Tere Bina Bhi Nahin Jee Sakte"	Kalyanji-Anandji	Anjaan	Asha Bhosle, Hemlata, Mahendra Kapoor
Jwalamukhi	1548	"Kabhi Tumne Kisiko Phansa"	Kalyanji-Anandji	Anjaan	solo
Jwalamukhi	1549	"Humko Toh Nasha Hai Mohabbat"	Kalyanji-Anandji	Anjaan	Shatrughan Sinha
Jwalamukhi	1550	"Yeh Chehre Pe Chehra"	Kalyanji-Anandji	Anjaan	solo
Karz	1551	"Ek Haseena Thi"	Laxmikant-Pyarelal	Anand Bakshi	Asha Bhosle
Karz	1552	"Om Shanti Om"	Laxmikant-Pyarelal	Anand Bakshi	solo
Karz	1553	"Paisa Yeh Paisa"	Laxmikant-Pyarelal	Anand Bakshi	solo
Karz	1554	"Main Solah Baras Ki"	Laxmikant-Pyarelal	Anand Bakshi	Lata Mangeshkar
Karz	1555	"Kamaal Hai Kamaal Hai"	Laxmikant-Pyarelal	Anand Bakshi	Manna Dey, Anuradha Paudwal
Kashish	1556	"Hum Do Pardesi"	Kalyanji-Anandji	Anjaan	Suman Kalyanpur
Katil Kaun?	1557	"Jaoon Kahan Gori"	R. D. Burman	Anand Bakshi	solo
Katil Kaun?	1558	"Teri Akhiyan Meri Akhiyan" (male)	R. D. Burman	Anand Bakshi	solo
Katil Kaun?	1559	"Teri Akhiyan Meri Akhiyan" (duet)	R. D. Burman	Anand Bakshi	Lata Mangeshkar
Khwaaish	1560	"Jabse Basa Hai Dil Mein Tu"	R. D. Burman	Nida Fazli	Asha Bhosle
Kismet	1561	"Girke Sambhalte Hai Hum"	Bappi Lahiri	Amit Khanna	solo
Lootmar	1562	"Hans Tu Hardam"	Rajesh Roshan	Amit Khanna	Varsha Bhosle, Shivangi Kolhapure
Lootmar	1563	"Aaj Ka Din Koi Bhoole Na"	Rajesh Roshan	Amit Khanna	Lata Mangeshkar
Lootmar	1564	"Piya Hum Saat Mulk Ka Paani"	Rajesh Roshan	Amit Khanna	solo
Lootmar	1565	"Piya Hum"	Rajesh Roshan	Amit Khanna	Mehmood
Maang Bharo Sajana	1566	"O Mere Mehboob"	Laxmikant-Pyarelal	Anand Bakshi	Asha Bhosle
Maang Bharo Sajana	1567	"Hum Barson Baad Mile"	Laxmikant-Pyarelal	Anand Bakshi	Asha Bhosle
Maang Bharo Sajana	1568	"Saajan Ho Saajan"	Laxmikant-Pyarelal	Anand Bakshi	Lata Mangeshkar
Man Pasand	1569	"Main Akela Apni Dhun Mein"	Rajesh Roshan	Amit Khanna	solo
Man Pasand	1570	"Manmani Se Hargiz Na Daro"	Rajesh Roshan	Amit Khanna	solo
Man Pasand	1571	"Charu Chandra Ki Chanchal"	Rajesh Roshan	Amit Khanna	Lata Mangeshkar
Man Pasand	1572	"Sa Re Ga Ma Pa"	Rajesh Roshan	Amit Khanna	Lata Mangeshkar
Nazrana Pyar Ka	1573	"Bahon Ke Ghere Mein"	Hemant Bhosle	Vitthalbhai Patel	Asha Bhosle
Nazrana Pyar Ka	1574	"Jabse Dekha Hai"	Hemant Bhosle	Nida Fazli	Asha Bhosle
Neeyat	1575	"Pyaar Karna Nahin Aaya"	Kalyanji-Anandji	Indeevar	solo
Neeyat	1576	"Tune Apni Jaan Dekar"	Kalyanji-Anandji	Gulshan Bawra	solo
Neeyat	1577	"Hum Teenon Ki Woh Yaari"	Kalyanji-Anandji	Gulshan Bawra	Mohammad Rafi, Nitin Mukesh
Nishana	1578	"Apni Mohabbat Se"	Laxmikant-Pyarelal	Anand Bakshi	Asha Bhosle
Nishana	1579	"Jaana Zara Saamne Aa"	Laxmikant-Pyarelal	Anand Bakshi	Asha Bhosle
Nishana	1580	"Tip Tip Tip Tip Hone Lagi"	Laxmikant-Pyarelal	Anand Bakshi	Asha Bhosle
Nishana	1581	"O Gori Shehar Ki Chhori"	Laxmikant-Pyarelal	Anand Bakshi	Anuradha Paudwal
Oh Bewafaa	1582	"Arre Dekh Li Teri Bambai"	Vedpal	Saawan Kumar Tak	solo
Parakh	1583	"Main Bhi Yehi Sochoon"	Ravindra Jain	Ravindra Jain	Hemlata
Parakh	1584	"Hone Laga Hai Mujhe"	Ravindra Jain	Ravindra Jain	Hemlata
Patita	1585	"Dil Dhak Dhak Karne Laga"	Laxmikant-Pyarelal	Anand Bakshi	solo
Patita	1586	"Hothon Pe Jaan Chali Aayegi"	Laxmikant-Pyarelal	Anand Bakshi	solo
Phir Wahi Raat	1587	"Dekho Idhar Dekho"	R. D. Burman	Majrooh Sultanpuri	Asha Bhosle, Sushma Shreshtha
Phir Wahi Raat	1588	"Sang Mere Nikle The Saajan"	R. D. Burman	Majrooh Sultanpuri	Lata Mangeshkar
Phir Wahi Raat	1589	"Chhalkao Jhoonke Paimana"	R. D. Burman	Majrooh Sultanpuri	solo
Pyaara Dushman	1590	"Goriya Hamen Jeena Hai Teri Gali Mein"	Bappi Lahiri	Anjaan	Asha Bhosle
Pyaara Dushman	1591	"Tu Hai Meri Deewani"	Bappi Lahiri	Anjaan	Asha Bhosle
Pyaara Dushman	1592	"Ek Dhoondho Milte Hain Hazaar"	Bappi Lahiri	Indeevar	Asha Bhosle
Pyar To Hona Hi Tha	1593	"Bhale Jaan Jaye"	R. D. Burman	Indeevar, Anjaan	solo
Qurbani	1594	"Qurbani Qurbani"	Kalyanji-Anandji	Farooq Kaiser	Aziz Nazan, Anwar
Ram Balram	1595	"Hum Ka Maafi Dai Do"	Laxmikant-Pyarelal	Anand Bakshi	Asha Bhosle
Ram Balram	1596	"Yaar Ki Khabar Mil Gayi"	Laxmikant-Pyarelal	Anand Bakshi	Asha Bhosle
Ram Balram	1597	"Ek Rasta Do Raahi"	Laxmikant-Pyarelal	Anand Bakshi	Mohammad Rafi
Ramu To Deewana Hai	1598	"Humne Yeh Maana"	Chandru	Chandru	solo
Ramu To Deewana Hai	1599	"Zindagi Hai Tadapna"	Chandru	Chandru	solo
Red Rose	1600	"Kiski Sadayen Mujhko Bulaye"	R. D. Burman		Asha Bhosle
Red Rose	1601	"Tere Bin Jeena Kya"	R. D. Burman		Asha Bhosle
Saboot	1602	"Jeena Bhi Koi Jeena Hai" (happy)	Bappi Lahiri	Amit Khanna	Lata Mangeshkar
Saboot	1603	"Jeena Bhi Koi Jeena Hai" (sad)	Bappi Lahiri	Amit Khanna	solo
Shaan	1604	"Dariya Mein Jahaaz Chale"	R. D. Burman	Anand Bakshi	Asha Bhosle, Usha Mangeshkar
Shaan	1605	"Jaanu Meri Jaan"	R. D. Burman	Anand Bakshi	Asha Bhosle, Mohammad Rafi, Usha Mangeshkar
Swayamvar	1606	"Naari Kuchh Aisan"	Rajesh Roshan	Gulzar	solo
Swayamvar	1607	"Aap Apne Nashe Mein"	Rajesh Roshan	Gulzar	solo
Swayamvar	1608	"Ek Mahal Ma Chham Chham"	Rajesh Roshan	Gulzar	Mohammad Rafi
Takkar	1609	"Jab Jab Dekhoon Main Teri Taraf"	R. D. Burman	Anand Bakshi	Lata Mangeshkar
Takkar	1610	"Ritu Ru Ritu Ru"	R. D. Burman	Anand Bakshi	solo
Takkar	1611	"Ganesh Ki Moorti"	R. D. Burman	Anand Bakshi	Mahendra Kapoor
Taxi Chor	1612	"Vaada Hai Kya"	Bappi Lahiri	Anjaan	solo
Taxi Chor	1613	"Na Hum Pagal Hain"	Bappi Lahiri	Anjaan	Shailendra Singh
Taxi Chor	1614	"Jhonka Hawa Ka"	Bappi Lahiri	Anjaan	Usha Mangeshkar
The Burning Train	1615	"Pehli Nazar Mein Humne Apna"	R. D. Burman	Sahir Ludhianvi	Asha Bhosle, Mohammed Rafi, Usha Mangeshkar
The Burning Train	1616	"Vaada Haan Ji Vaada"	R. D. Burman	Sahir Ludhianvi	Asha Bhosle
Thodisi Bewafaii	1617	"Aankhon Mein Humne Aapke Sapne"	Khayyam	Gulzar	Lata Mangeshkar
Thodisi Bewafaii	1618	"Hazaar Raahen Mudke Dekhi"	Khayyam	Gulzar	Lata Mangeshkar
Tu Meri Main Tera	1619	"Suryamukhi Hai Mukhda Tera"	Sharda	Neeraj	solo
Tu Meri Main Tera	1620	"Tu Meri Main Tera"	Sharda	Indeevar	Sharda
Yari Dushmani	1621	"Hum Galiyon Ke Paale"	Laxmikant-Pyarelal	Anand Bakshi	Manna Dey
Yeh Kaisa Insaf	1622	"Pyaar Main Karoonga"	Ravindra Jain	Ravindra Jain	Asha Bhosle
Yeh Kaisa Insaf	1623	"Kuchh Kehne Ko Aaya Tha"	Ravindra Jain	Ravindra Jain	Asha Bhosle
Zalim	1624	"Chalo Kho Jaaye In Nazaron Mein"	Laxmikant-Pyarelal	Anand Bakshi	Asha Bhosle
Zalim	1625	"Parwane O Deewane"	Laxmikant-Pyarelal	Anand Bakshi	Manna Dey

==== 1981 ====
Film	No.	Song	Composer(s)	Writer(s)	Co-artist(s)
Aapas Ki Baat	1626	"Tera Chehra Mujhe Gulaab Lage"	Anu Malik	Hasrat Jaipuri	solo
Aapas Ki Baat	1627	"Rang Ude Rangon Mein"	Anu Malik	Anjaan	Asha Bhosle
Aas Paas	1628	"Tum Jo Chale Gaye"	Laxmikant-Pyarelal	Anand Bakshi	Lata Mangeshkar
Agni Pareeksha	1629	"Mil Gayi Achanak Mujhe"	Salil Chowdhury	Yogesh	solo
Armaan	1630	"Pyaar Hi Jeene ki Soorat Hai"	Bappi Lahiri	Indeevar	solo
Armaan	1631	"Jeevan Mitaana Hai"	Bappi Lahiri	Indeevar	solo
Barsaat Ki Ek Raat	1632	"Manchali O Manchali"	R. D. Burman	Anand Bakshi	Asha Bhosle
Barsaat Ki Ek Raat	1633	"Kaliram Ki Dhol"	R. D. Burman	Anand Bakshi	solo
Barsaat Ki Ek Raat	1634	"Apne Pyaar Ke Sapne Sach Hue"	R. D. Burman	Anand Bakshi	Lata Mangeshkar
Baseraa	1635	"Tumhen Chhodke Ab"	R. D. Burman	Gulzar	Asha Bhosle
Bhaagya	1636	"Shivji Ke Chelo"	Ravindra Jain	Ravindra Jain	Hemlata
Bhaagya	1637	"Koi Phool Na Mehke"	Ravindra Jain	Ravindra Jain	Hemlata
Bharosa	1638	"Kaise Dekhoon"	R. D. Burman	Gulzar	Asha Bhosle
Bharosa	1639	"Phoolon Ki Zubaan"	R. D. Burman	Gulzar	Asha Bhosle
Bharosa	1640	"Yeh Din Dhala"	R. D. Burman	Gulzar	solo
Biwi-O-Biwi	1641	"Meri Bulbul Yun Na Ho Gul"	R. D. Burman	Nida Fazli	Lata Mangeshkar
Biwi-O-Biwi	1642	"Ek Nahin Do Nahin"	R. D. Burman	Vitthalbhai Patel	Lata Mangeshkar
Biwi-O-Biwi	1643	"Waqt Se Pehle"	R. D. Burman	Vitthalbhai Patel	solo
Biwi-O-Biwi	1644	"Gori Ho Kaali Ho"	R. D. Burman	Nida Fazli	solo
Biwi-O-Biwi	1645	"Sadiyon Se Duniya Mein"	R. D. Burman	Nida Fazli	solo
Biwi-O-Biwi	1646	"Socha Tha Kya"	R. D. Burman		solo
Bulundi	1647	"Abhi To Hum Hue Jawaan"	R. D. Burman	Majrooh Sultanpuri	solo
Bulundi	1648	"Kaho Kahan Chalo"	R. D. Burman	Majrooh Sultanpuri	Asha Bhosle
Commander	1649	"Mere Yaar Bina Pyar"	Kalyanji-Anandji	Anjaan	Anwar
Daasi	1650	"Premi Sabhi Hote Hain Deewane"	Rajesh Roshan	Anand Bakshi	Lata Mangeshkar
Dahshat	1651	"Mere Pyar Ka Meter Chal Raha"	Bappi Lahiri	Amit Khanna	solo
Dard	1652	"Jagmag Jagmag Si Mehfil"	Khayyam	Naqsh Lyallpuri	Asha Bhosle
Dard	1653	"Pyaar Ka Dard Hai"	Khayyam	Naqsh Lyallpuri	Asha Bhosle
Dard	1654	"Aye Haseen Chandni"	Khayyam	Naqsh Lyallpuri	solo
Dhanwan	1655	"Maari Bhar Bhar Kar Pichkari" (part 1)	Hridaynath Mangeshkar	Sahir Ludhianvi	Usha Mangeshkar
Dhanwan	1656	"Maaro Bhar Bhar Kar Pichkari" (part 2)	Hridaynath Mangeshkar	Sahir Ludhianvi	Usha Mangeshkar
Dhanwan	1657	"Idhar Aa Aa Bhi Jaa"	Hridaynath Mangeshkar	Sahir Ludhianvi	solo
Dushman Dost	1658	"Main Kaun Tu Jadugar"	R D Burman	Anand Bakshi	Mohammad Rafi, Asha Bhosle
Dushman Dost	1659	"Ladki Nahin Bijli Hai Tu"	R D Burman	Anand Bakshi	solo
Ek Aur Ekk Gyarah	1660	"Aao Koi Baat Karen Pyaar Ko"	Laxmikant-Pyarelal	Majrooh Sultanpuri	solo
Ek Aur Ekk Gyarah	1661	"Hum Hain Ek Aur Ek Gyarah"	Laxmikant-Pyarelal	Majrooh Sultanpuri	Mohammed Rafi
Ek Aur Ekk Gyarah	1662	"Garibon Ki Holi"	Laxmikant-Pyarelal	Majrooh Sultanpuri	Asha Bhosle, Hemlata
Fiffty Fiffty	1663	"Dilwala Aaya Hai"	Laxmikant-Pyarelal	Anand Bakshi	solo
Fiffty Fiffty	1664	"Jaane Do Mujhe Yaaron"	Laxmikant-Pyarelal	Anand Bakshi	solo
Fiffty Fiffty	1665	"Pyaar Ka Vaada Fiffty Fiffty"	Laxmikant-Pyarelal	Anand Bakshi	Asha Bhosle
Gehra Zakhm	1666	Mausam Bheega Bheega"	R. D. Burman	Vitthalbhai Patel	Asha Bhosle
Gehra Zakhm	1667	"Aisa Ho Toh Kaisa Ho"	R. D. Burman	Nida Fazli	Sapan Chakraborty
Gehrayee	1668	"Rishte Bas Rishte Hote Hain"	Laxmikant-Pyarelal	Gulzar	solo
Ghungroo Ki Awaaz	1669	"Ankhiyon Ka Kajra"	R. D. Burman	Vijay Anand	Asha Bhosle
Ghungroo Ki Awaaz	1670	"Tere Ghungroo Ki Awaaz"	R. D. Burman	Vijay Anand	solo
Harjaee	1671	"Kabhi Palkon Ke Aansoo Hain"	R. D. Burman	Nida Fazli	solo
Harjaee	1672	"Tujhsa Haseen Dekha Na Kahin"	R. D. Burman	Vitthalbhai Patel	solo
Harjaee	1673	"Yeh Rut Hai Haseen"	R. D. Burman	Vitthalbhai Patel	solo
Harjaee	1674	"Sun Zara Shokh Haseena"	R. D. Burman	Gulshan Bawra	Asha Bhosle
Harjaee	1675	"Kherishu Varishu"	R. D. Burman	Gulshan Bawra	Asha Bhosle
Hum Se Badkar Kaun	1676	"Masti Ka Main Jaam Hoon"	Raam Laxman	Ravinder Rawal	solo
Itni Si Baat	1677	"Dheere Dheere Aankh Ladi"	Kalyanji-Anandji	Anjaan	Anuradha Paudwal
Itni Si Baat	1678	"Yun Na Rootho"	Kalyanji-Anandji	Anjaan	Asha Bhosle, Bhavna Shah
Jail Yatra	1679	"Bachna Rajaji"	R. D. Burman	Majrooh Sultanpuri	solo
Jail Yatra	1680	"Yeh Jo Nazar Humari Tumhari"	R. D. Burman	Majrooh Sultanpuri	Lata Mangeshkar
Jeene Ki Arzoo	1681	"Aadhi Ye Raat Jale"	Bappi Lahiri	Anjaan	solo
Josh	1682	"Jinke Liye Hum"	Bappi Lahiri	Amit Khanna	solo
Jyoti	1683	"Chidiya Choo Choo Karti Hai"	Bappi Lahiri	Anand Bakshi	solo
Kaalia	1684	"Jahan Teri Yeh Nazar Hai"	R. D. Burman	Majrooh Sultanpuri	solo
Kaalia	1685	"Jabse Tumko Dekha"	R. D. Burman	Majrooh Sultanpuri	Asha Bhosle, Antara Chowdhury, Usha Rege
Kaalia	1686	"Tum Saath Ho Jab Apne"	R. D. Burman	Majrooh Sultanpuri	Asha Bhosle
Kahani Ek Chor Ki	1687	"Karishma Yeh Kya Meri Jaan"	Ravindra Jain	Hasrat Jaipuri	Hemlata
Kahani Ek Chor Ki	1688	"Sabko Muraden Milti Hai"	Ravindra Jain	Hasrat Jaipuri	Asha Bhosle
Kaaran	1689	"Kaaran Na Jane Koi"	Usha Khanna	Indeevar	solo
Katilon Ke Kaatil	1690	"Yak Bayak Koi Kahin"	Kalyanji-Anandji	Anjaan	Asha Bhosle
Katilon Ke Kaatil	1691	"Saare Bazaar Karenge Pyaar"	Kalyanji-Anandji	Rajendra Krishan	Asha Bhosle
Khara Khota	1692	"Kabhi Hoti Nahin Jiski Haar" (male)	Babla	Indeevar	solo
Khara Khota	1693	"Pandrah Ki Dulhan"	Babla	Anjaan	solo
Khoon Aur Paani	1694	"Duje Ki Biwi Gori Lage"	Laxmikant-Pyarelal	Majrooh Sultanpuri	Mahendra Kapoor
Khoon Aur Paani	1695	"Mat Jaa Mat Jaa"	Laxmikant-Pyarelal	Majrooh Sultanpuri	Asha Bhosle
Khoon Ka Rishta	1696	"Pyar Bhi Nahin"	Kalyanji-Anandji	Majrooh Sultanpuri	solo
Khoon Ka Rishta	1697	"Chahe Pyaar Ka Khiladi"	Kalyanji-Anandji	Majrooh Sultanpuri	solo
Kranti	1698	"Chana Jor Garam"	Laxmikant-Pyarelal	Santosh Anand	Lata Mangeshkar, Mukesh, Mohammad Rafi
Krodhi	1699	"Ladkiwalon Ladki Tumhari"	Laxmikant-Pyarelal	Anand Bakshi	Asha Bhosle
Kudrat	1700	"Chhodo Sanam Kaahe Ka Gham"	R. D. Burman	Majrooh Sultanpuri	Annette Pinto
Kudrat	1701	"Humein Tumse Pyaar Kitna" (male)	R. D. Burman	Majrooh Sultanpuri	solo
Laawaris	1702	"Kab Ke Bichhde Hue"	Kalyanji-Anandji	Anjaan	Asha Bhosle
Laawaris	1703	"Jiska Koi Nahin"	Kalyanji-Anandji	Anjaan	solo
Laawaris	1704	"Kaahe Paise Ka Itna Guroor"	Kalyanji-Anandji	Anjaan	solo
Laawaris	1705	"Apni Toh Jaise Taise"	Kalyanji-Anandji	Prakash Mehra	solo
Ladaaku	1706	"Noorie O Noorie"	Usha Khanna	Indeevar, Asad Bhopali, Vitthalbhai Patel, Kulwant Jani	solo
Laparwah	1707	"Koi Bhi Dil Mein Na Aaya Tha"	Bappi Lahiri	Ramesh Pant	Chandrani Mukherjee
Mahfil	1708	"Pyaar To Hai Yahaan"	Shankar-Jaikishan	Majrooh Sultanpuri	solo
Main Aur Mera Haathi	1709	"Main Aur Mera Haathi"	Kalyanji-Anandji	Maya Govind	solo
Main Aur Mera Haathi	1710	"Tere Liye Yeh Saare Nazaare"	Kalyanji-Anandji	Maya Govind	Anuradha Paudwal
Main Aur Mera Haathi	1711	"Hain Kahan Jo Mit Gaye"	Kalyanji-Anandji	Maya Govind	Hemlata
Meri Aawaz Suno	1712	"Mehmanon Ko Salaam Hai Mera"	Laxmikant-Pyarelal	Anand Bakshi	Asha Bhosle
Meri Aawaz Suno	1713	"Haye Kya Soch Rahi Ho"	Laxmikant-Pyarelal	Anand Bakshi	Asha Bhosle
Naari	1714	"Mujhe Poochhne Ka Yeh Haque"	Shankar-Jaikishan	M. G. Hashmat	solo
Naseeb	1715	"Pakdo Pakdo"	Laxmikant-Pyarelal	Anand Bakshi	Usha Mangeshkar
Naseeb	1716	"Rang Jamake Jaayenge"	Laxmikant-Pyarelal	Anand Bakshi	Asha Bhosle, Mohammad Rafi, Usha Mangeshkar
Paanch Qaidi	1717	"Maa Toh Hai Maa"	Bappi Lahiri	Anjaan	solo
Professor Pyarelal	1718	"Aisa Bhi Aata Hai Mauka"	Kalyanji-Anandji	Rajendra Krishan	solo
Professor Pyarelal	1719	"Dil Ki Khushi Yun"	Kalyanji-Anandji	Rajendra Krishan	solo
Professor Pyarelal	1720	"Gaa Gaa Gaa Gaaye Jaa"	Kalyanji-Anandji	Rajendra Krishan	Manhar Udhas
Professor Pyarelal	1721	"Gaa Gaa Gaa Gaaye Jaa" (sad)	Kalyanji-Anandji	Rajendra Krishan	solo
Pyaasa Sawan	1722	"Main Wahan Hoon"	Laxmikant-Pyarelal	Gulshan Bawra	solo
Pyaasa Sawan	1723	"O Meri Chhammak Chhallo"	Laxmikant-Pyarelal	Santosh Anand	Asha Bhosle
Raksha	1724	"Naye Purane Saal Mein"	R. D. Burman	Anand Bakshi	Asha Bhosle
Raksha	1725	"Mil Gaye Dil"	R. D. Burman	Anand Bakshi	Asha Bhosle
Raksha	1726	"Tere Liye, Mere Liye"	R. D. Burman	Anand Bakshi	solo
Rocky	1727	"Doston Ko Salaam"	R. D. Burman	Anand Bakshi	solo
Rocky	1728	"Aao Mere Yaaro"	R. D. Burman	Anand Bakshi	solo
Rocky	1729	"Aa Dekhen Zara"	R. D. Burman	Anand Bakshi	Asha Bhosle, R. D. Burman
Rocky	1730	"Kya Yehi Pyaar Hai"	R. D. Burman	Anand Bakshi	Lata Mangeshkar
Rocky	1731	"Hum Tumse Mile"	R. D. Burman	Anand Bakshi	Lata Mangeshkar
Shakka	1732	"Sun Mere Yaar"	Rajesh Roshan	Verma Malik	solo
Silsila	1733	"Sar Se Sarke Sarke Chunariya"	Shiv-Hari	Hasan Kamal	Lata Mangeshkar
Silsila	1734	"Ladki Hai Ya Shola"	Shiv-Hari	Rajendra Krishan	Lata Mangeshkar
Silsila	1735	"Dekha Ek Khwab To" (happy)	Shiv-Hari	Javed Akhtar	Lata Mangeshkar
Silsila	1736	"Dekha Ek Khwab To" (sad)	Shiv-Hari	Javed Akhtar	Lata Mangeshkar
Silsila	1737	"Dekha Ek Khwab" (with Dialogue)	Shiv-Hari	Javed Akhtar	Lata Mangeshkar, Amitabh Bachchan
Waqt Ki Deewar	1738	"Chal Canima Dekhan Ko Jaye Gori"	Laxmikant-Pyarelal	Anjaan	Asha Bhosle
Waqt Ki Deewar	1739	"Manchahi Ladki Kahin Koi Mil Jaye"	Laxmikant-Pyarelal	Anjaan	Asha Bhosle
Waqt Ki Deewar	1740	"Ae Yaar Teri Yaari"	Laxmikant-Pyarelal	Anjaan	Mohammed Rafi
Yaarana	1741	"Bhole O Bhole"	Rajesh Roshan	Anjaan	solo
Yaarana	1742	"Tu Rootha Dil Toota"	Rajesh Roshan	Anjaan	solo
Yaarana	1743	"Chhookar Mere Mann Ko"	Rajesh Roshan	Anjaan	solo
Yaarana	1744	"Tere Jaisa Yaar Kahaan"	Rajesh Roshan	Anjaan	solo
Yaarana	1745	"Saara Zamana Haseenon Ka Deewana"	Rajesh Roshan	Anjaan	solo

==== 1982 ====
Film	No.	Song	Composer(s)	Writer(s)	Co-artist(s)
Aamne Samne	1746	"Main Tum Ban Gaya"	R D Burman	Anjaan	solo
Aamne Samne	1747	"Maine Kaha Tha"	R D Burman	Anjaan	solo
Apna Bana Lo	1748	"Main Hoon Deewana"	Laxmikant-Pyarelal	Anand Bakshi	solo
Apna Bana Lo	1749	"Main Sunti Hoon Dil Kehti Hai"	Laxmikant-Pyarelal	Anand Bakshi	Lata Mangeshkar
Ashanti	1750	"Na Tujhse Na Mujhse"	R D Burman	Anand Bakshi	Asha Bhosle, Shailendra Singh
Badle Ki Aag	1751	"Main Jis Mehfil Mein"	Laxmikant-Pyarelal	Verma Malik	Mahendra Kapoor, Suresh Wadkar
Barrister	1752	"Gora Gora Chhora"	Hemant Bhosle	Yogesh	Asha Bhosle
Bemisal	1753	"Khafa Hoon Khafa Hoon"	R D Burman	Anand Bakshi	solo
Bemisal	1754	"Ek Roz Main Tadap Kar"	R D Burman	Anand Bakshi	solo
Bemisal	1755	"Kitni Khubsoorat Hai Yeh Tasveer"	R D Burman	Anand Bakshi	Lata Mangeshkar, Suresh Wadkar
Bezubaan	1756	"Gaon Galiyon Phoolon Kaliyon"	Raam Laxman	Ravinder Rawal	Asha Bhosle
Bezubaan	1757	"Tere Jaisa Koi"	Raam Laxman	Ravinder Rawal	solo
Bezubaan	1758	"Tere Jaisa Koi" (Sad)	Raam Laxman	Ravinder Rawal	solo
Bheegi Palkein	1759	"Jab Tak Maine Samjha"	Jugal Kishore–Tilak Raj	M G Hashmat	solo
Chalti Ka Naam Zindagi	1760	"Bandh Mutthi Lakh Ki"	Kishore Kumar	Irshad	Mohammad Rafi, Manna Dey
Chalti Ka Naam Zindagi	1761	"Chalti Ka Naam Zindagi" (part 1)	Kishore Kumar	Irshad	Mahendra Kapoor
Chalti Ka Naam Zindagi	1762	"Chalti Ka Naam Zindagi" (part 2)	Kishore Kumar	Irshad	solo
Chalti Ka Naam Zindagi	1763	"Ghoonghar Wale Baal'	Kishore Kumar	Anjaan	Mahendra Kapoor, Bhushan Mehta, Pankaj Mitra, Sunil
Chalti Ka Naam Zindagi	1764	"Yeh Mohabbat Kya Karenge"	Kishore Kumar	Anjaan	Asha Bhosle, Amit Kumar, Dilraj Kaur, Shankar Das
Chorni	1665	"Dekha Hai Tumhen Kahin Na Kahin"	Shankar-Jaikishan	Singaar	solo
Chorni	1666	"Kehta Hai Dil Mere Sanam"	Shankar-Jaikishan	Hasrat Jaipuri	solo
Daulat	1767	"Moti Ho Toh Bandhke Rakh doon"	R D Burman	Nida Fazli, Vitthalbhai Patel	solo
Daulat	1768	"Tum Badi Khubsoorat Ho"	R D Burman	Nida Fazli, Vitthalbhai Patel	Asha Bhosle
Deedar-E-Yaar	1769	"Mere Dildar Ka Baankpan"	Laxmikant-Pyarelal	Sahir Ludhianvi	Mohammed Rafi
Deedar-E-Yaar	1770	"Sarakti Jaaye Hai Rukhse Naqaab"	Laxmikant-Pyarelal	Ameer Meenai	Lata Mangeshkar
Deedar-E-Yaar	1771	"Chala Chal Lifaafe"	Laxmikant-Pyarelal	Kaifi Azmi, Sahir Ludhianvi	solo
Desh Premee	1772	"Khatoon Ki Khidmat Mein"	Laxmikant-Pyarelal	Anand Bakshi	solo
Desh Premee	1773	"Jaa Jaldi Bhaag Jaa"	Laxmikant-Pyarelal	Anand Bakshi	Amit Kumar
Dial 100	1774	"Dekhe Tujhe Jo"	Bappi Lahiri	Anjaan	solo
Dial 100	1775	"Aadhi Aadhi Raat"	Bappi Lahiri	Anjaan	Asha Bhosle
Dial 100	1776	"Main Naachun Tu Saaz Utha"	Bappi Lahiri	Anjaan	Asha Bhosle
Dial 100	1777	"Aaj Milne Ka Vaada Hai"	Bappi Lahiri	Anjaan	Mahendra Kapoor, Minoo Purushottam
Dil-e-Nadaan	1778	"Tera Ishq Hai Meri Zindagi"	Khayyam	Naqsh Lyallpuri	Lata Mangeshkar
Dil-e-Nadaan	1779	"Chandni Raat Mein"	Khayyam	Naqsh Lyallpuri	Lata Mangeshkar
Dil-e-Nadaan	1780	"Agar Leta Hoon Tera Naam"	Khayyam	Naqsh Lyallpuri	solo
Disco Dancer	1781	"Ay O Zara Mudke"	Bappi Lahiri	Anjaan	solo
Do Guru	1782	"Hum Hain Do Guru"	Kalyanji-Anandji	Verma Malik	Mahendra Kapoor
Dulha Bikta Hai	1783	"Dulha Bikta Hai"	Bappi Lahiri	Farooque Kaiser	solo
Eent Ka Jawab Patthar	1784	"Poochha Jo Pyaar Kya Hai"	Shankar-Jaikishan	Aziz Kashmiri	Ranu Mukherjee
Eent Ka Jawab Patthar	1785	"Ahista Ahista"	Shankar-Jaikishan	Naqsh Lyallpuri	solo
Farz Aur Kanoon	1786	"Mere Ghar Ka Kiraya Do"	Laxmikant-Pyarelal	Anand Bakshi	Asha Bhosle
Farz Aur Kanoon	1787	"Naujawan Naujawan"	Laxmikant-Pyarelal	Anand Bakshi	Asha Bhosle
Geet Ganga	1788	"Geeton Mein Mere"	Sapan-Jagmohan	Anjaan	solo
Ghazab	1789	"Ghar Se Chali Thi Main"	Laxmikant-Pyarelal	Anand Bakshi	solo
Ghazab	1790	"Aage Se Dekho Peechhe Se Dekho"	Laxmikant-Pyarelal	Anand Bakshi	Amit Kumar
Gul-E-Bakavali	1791	"Koi Apna Na Hua"	Rajesh Roshan	Indeevar	Lata Mangeshkar
Gul-E-Bakavali	1792	"Nafrat Chhupi Huyi"	Rajesh Roshan	Indeevar	Anuradha Paudwal
Gumsoom	1793	"Ari Ho Paro"	Bappi Lahiri	Yogesh	Asha Bhosle
Haathkadi	1794	"Ek Bar Milke"	Bappi Lahiri	Majrooh Sultanpuri	Asha Bhosle
Haathkadi	1795	"Kabhi Tum Aag Ho"	Bappi Lahiri	Majrooh Sultanpuri	Asha Bhosle
Haathkadi	1796	"Jiyo Jiyo Pyare"	Bappi Lahiri	Majrooh Sultanpuri	Asha Bhosle
Hamari Bahu Alka	1797	"Prem Ki Hai Kya"	Rajesh Roshan	Amit Khanna	solo
Insaan	1798	"Koi Na Jab Tera Saathi" (Fast)	Laxmikant-Pyarelal	Anand Bakshi	solo
Jaanwar	1799	"Dil Geet Milan Ke Gaane Laga"	Laxmikant-Pyarelal	Majrooh Sultanpuri	Asha Bhosle
Jaanwar	1800	"Insaanon Se Jaanwar Achchha Hai	Laxmikant-Pyarelal	Majrooh Sultanpuri	solo
Jaanwar	1801	"Mehbooba Meri Mehbooba"	Laxmikant-Pyarelal	Majrooh Sultanpuri	solo
Jaanwar	1802	"Pyaar Ki Vaadiyan"	Laxmikant-Pyarelal	Majrooh Sultanpuri	solo
Jawalaa Dahej Ki	1803	"Maana Safar Hai Mushkil"	Chitragupta	Anjaan	Asha Bhosle
Jeevan Dhaara	1804	"Gangaram Kawara Reh Gaya"	Laxmikant-Pyarelal	Anand Bakshi	solo
Johny I Love You	1805	"Aage Aage Dulha Chale'	Rajesh Roshan	Anand Bakshi	solo
Johny I Love You	1806	"Johny Dilbar Jaani"	Rajesh Roshan	Anand Bakshi	Asha Bhosle
Johny I Love You	1807	"Aa Samne Maidan Mein"	Rajesh Roshan	Anand Bakshi	
Kaamchor	1808	"Mal De Gulaal"	Rajesh Roshan	Indeevar	Lata Mangeshkar
Kaamchor	1809	"Tum Mere Swami"	Rajesh Roshan	Indeevar	Lata Mangeshkar
Kaamchor	1810	"Tujh Sang Preet Lagayi Sajna"	Rajesh Roshan	Indeevar	Lata Mangeshkar
Kaamchor	1811	"Jogi Ho Jogi"	Rajesh Roshan	Indeevar	solo
Kaamchor	1812	"Tumse Badhkar Duniya Mein (Duet)"	Rajesh Roshan	Indeevar	Alka Yagnik
Kachche Heere	1813	"Haare Na Insaan"	R. D. Burman	Majrooh Sultanpuri	solo
Kehdo Pyaar Hai	1814	"Bindiya Tum Sabse Keh Do"	Bappi Lahiri	Indeevar	Udit Narayan, Suresh Wadkar
Khud-Daar	1815	"Oonche Neeche Raaste"	Rajesh Roshan	Majrooh Sultanpuri	Lata Mangeshkar
Khud-Daar	1816	"Angrezi Mein Kehte Hai"	Rajesh Roshan	Majrooh Sultanpuri	Lata Mangeshkar
Khud-Daar	1817	"Mach Gaya Shor"	Rajesh Roshan	Majrooh Sultanpuri	Lata Mangeshkar
Khud-Daar	1818	"Disco '82"	Rajesh Roshan	Majrooh Sultanpuri	Lata Mangeshkar
Khud-Daar	1819	"Hat Jaa Baazoo"	Rajesh Roshan	Majrooh Sultanpuri	Sayed-Ul-Hasan
Khud-Daar	1820	"Maa Ka Pyaar"	Rajesh Roshan	Majrooh Sultanpuri	solo
Log Kya Kahenge	1821	"Tere Bina Main Mere Bina Tu"	Kalyanji-Anandji	Naqsh Lyallpuri	Lata Mangeshkar
Log Kya Kahenge	1822	"Tere Bina Main Mere Bina Tu (Version 2)"	Kalyanji-Anandji	Naqsh Lyallpuri	Lata Mangeshkar
Main Intaquam Loonga	1823	"Maamla Fit Ho Gaya"	Laxmikant-Pyarelal	Anand Bakshi	solo
Main Intaquam Loonga	1824	"Meri Achchhi Achchhi Maa"	Laxmikant-Pyarelal	Anand Bakshi	solo
Main Intaquam Loonga	1825	"Mujhe Na Bulaya Karo"	Laxmikant-Pyarelal	Anand Bakshi	Asha Bhosle
Mehndi Rang Layegi	1826	"Aankh Milti Hai To"	Laxmikant-Pyarelal	Anjaan	Asha Bhosle
Meharbaani	1827	"Tujhe Chor Kahoon Ya Qatil"	Ravindra Jain	Ravindra Jain	solo
Namak Halaal	1828	"Pag Ghugroo Bandh"	Bappi Lahiri	Anjaan	solo
Namak Halaal	1829	"Thodisi Jo Pee Lee Hain"	Bappi Lahiri	Anjaan	solo
Namak Halaal	1830	"Aaj Rapat Jaayen To"	Bappi Lahiri	Anjaan	Asha Bhosle
Namkeen	1831	"Raah Pe Rehte Hain"	R D Burman	Gulzar	solo
Patthar Ki Lakeer	1832	"Nashe Mein Hoon"	Usha Khanna	Anjaan	Chandrani Mukherjee
Patthar Ki Lakeer	1833	"Khule Badan Yeh Kapde"	Usha Khanna	Anjaan	solo
Patthar Ki Lakeer	1834	"Chhotasa Yeh Apne Ghar" (male)	Usha Khanna	Anjaan	solo
Pratishodh	1835	"Mere Sapnon Ka Gaon"	Ravindra Jain	Ravindra Jain	solo
Pratishodh	1836	"Rasleela Premleela"	Ravindra Jain	Ravindra Jain	solo
Pyaar Mein Sauda Nahin	1837	"Ab To Mere Huzoor"	Amar-Utpal	Majrooh Sultanpuri	Lata Mangeshkar
Pyaar Mein Sauda Nahin	1838	"Maan Liya Chalo Pyaar Ho Gaya"	Amar-Utpal	Majrooh Sultanpuri	solo
Raaj Mahal	1839	"Kya Se Kya Ho Jaye"	Kalyanji-Anandji	Verma Malik	Mahendra Kapoor
Raaste Pyar Ke	1840	"Gokul Ki Galiyon Ka Gwala"	Laxmikant-Pyarelal	Anand Bakshi	Asha Bhosle, Usha Mangeshkar
Raaste Pyar Ke	1841	"Log Jal Gaye"	Laxmikant-Pyarelal	Anand Bakshi	Anuradha Paudwal
Raaste Pyar Ke	1842	"Saara Din Satate Ho"	Laxmikant-Pyarelal	Anand Bakshi	Asha Bhosle
Rajput	1843	"Mere Sang Sang Aaya" (part 1)	Laxmikant-Pyarelal	Anand Bakshi	solo
Rajput	1844	"Mere Sang Sang Aaya" (part 2)	Laxmikant-Pyarelal	Anand Bakshi	solo
Samraat	1845	"Meri Patli Kamar Mein"	Laxmikant-Pyarelal	Anand Bakshi	Asha Bhosle
Samraat	1846	"Upar Zameen Neeche Aasman"	Laxmikant-Pyarelal	Anand Bakshi	Asha Bhosle
Samraat	1847	"Panja Chhakka Satta"	Laxmikant-Pyarelal	Anand Bakshi	Asha Bhosle, Shailendra Singh
Sanam Teri Kasam	1848	"Kitne Bhi Tu Karle Sitam (Male)"	R D Burman	Guslhan Bawra	solo
Sanam Teri Kasam	1849	"Sheeshe Ki Gharon Mein"	R D Burman	Guslhan Bawra	solo
Sanam Teri Kasam	1850	"Dekhta Hoon Koi Ladki Haseen"	R D Burman	Guslhan Bawra	solo
Sanam Teri Kasam	1851	"Kitne Bhi Tu Karle Sitam (Duet)"	R D Burman	Guslhan Bawra	Asha Bhosle
Satte Pe Satta	1852	"Zindagi Milke Bitayenge" (sad)	R D Burman	Guslhan Bawra	solo
Satte Pe Satta	1853	"Zindagi Milke Bitayenge" (happy)	R D Burman	Guslhan Bawra	R D Burman, Sapan Chakraborty, Bhupinder Singh
Satte Pe Satta	1854	"Dukki Pe Dukki Ho"	R D Burman	Guslhan Bawra	Asha Bhosle, R D Burman, Bhupinder Singh, Sapan Chakraborty, Basu Chakraborty
Satte Pe Satta	1855	"Pyaar Hamen Kis Mod Pe Le Aaya"	R D Burman	Guslhan Bawra	R D Burman, Sapan Chakraborty, Bhupinder Singh
Satte Pe Satta	1856	"Pariyon Ka Mela Hai"	R D Burman	Guslhan Bawra	R D Burman, Sapan Chakraborty, Annette Pinto
Satte Pe Satta	1857	"Jhuka Ke Sar Ko Puchho"	R D Burman	Guslhan Bawra	Asha Bhosle, Sapan Chakraborty
Satte Pe Satta	1858	"Dilbar Mere Kabtak Mujhe"	R D Burman	Anand Bakshi	Annette Pinto
Sawaal	1859	"Aisa Kuchh Karke"	Khayyam	Majrooh Sultanpuri	solo
Sawaal	1860	"Zindagi Haseen Haseen Hai"	Khayyam	Majrooh Sultanpuri	solo
Sawaal	1861	"Maana Churaoge Badan"	Khayyam	Majrooh Sultanpuri	Asha Bhosle
Shakti	1862	"Jaane Kaise Kab Kahaan"	R D Burman	Anand Bakshi	Lata Mangeshkar
Shaukeen	1863	"Jab Bhi Koi Kangana Bole"	R D Burman	Yogesh	solo
Shiv Charan	1864	"Koi Kab Talak"	Bappi Lahiri	Amit Khanna	Mahendra Kapoor
Shriman Shrimati	1865	"Ek Nasihat Mere Yaaro"	Rajesh Roshan	Majrooh Sultanpuri	Lata Mangeshkar
Shriman Shrimati	1866	"Main Tera Husband"	Rajesh Roshan	Majrooh Sultanpuri	Lata Mangeshkar
Shriman Shrimati	1867	"Sabke Aage Humko Nachaya"	Rajesh Roshan	Majrooh Sultanpuri	Lata Mangeshkar
Shriman Shrimati	1868	"Ori Hawa Dheerese Chal"	Rajesh Roshan	Majrooh Sultanpuri	solo
Shriman Shrimati	1869	"Ori Hawa Dheerese Chal" (Sad)	Rajesh Roshan	Majrooh Sultanpuri	solo
Siskiyan	1870	"Tujhe Dil Mein Basa Loon"	Sapan-Jagmohan	Shiv Kumar Saroj	solo
Siskiyan	1871	"Kal Kal Jo Beeta Hai"	Sapan-Jagmohan	Naqsh Lyallpuri	Sulakshana Pandit
Siskiyan	1872	"Ab Aur Na Mujhe Sharmao"	Sapan-Jagmohan	N/A	solo
Sugandh	1873	"Yeh Disco Ka Bukhar Hai"	Bappi Lahiri	Ramesh Pant	solo
Sugandh	1874	"Koyal Se Haud Kare Kauva"	Bappi Lahiri	Ramesh Pant	Usha Mangeshkar
Suraag	1875	"Pyar Pyar Pyar"	Bappi Lahiri	Kaifi Azmi	solo
Suraag	1876	"Kya Hua Are Kya Hua"	Bappi Lahiri	Kaifi Azmi	solo
Swami Dada	1877	"Galiyon Galiyon Khaak Bahut"	R D Burman	Anjaan	Lata Mangeshkar
Swami Dada	1878	"Sun Sun Sun Jeenewale"	R D Burman	Anjaan	Lata Mangeshkar, Annette Pinto
Swami Dada	1879	"Pyar Do Pyar Lo"	R D Burman	Anjaan	Anand Kumar C
Swami Dada	1880	"Zindagi Yeh Kaisi Hai"	R D Burman	Anjaan	Asha Bhosle, Amit Kumar
Swami Dada	1881	"Ek Roop Kayi Naam"	R D Burman	Anjaan	solo
Taaqat	1882	"O Teri Nindiya Ko"	Laxmikant-Pyarelal	Anand Bakshi	Rakhee
Taaqat	1883	"Hum Bhi Yahan Tum Bhi Yahan"	Laxmikant-Pyarelal	Anand Bakshi	Anuradha Paudwal, Hemlata
Teesri Aankh	1884	"O Babu Humne Toh Pyaar Kiya Hai"	Laxmikant-Pyarelal	Anand Bakshi	Lata Mangeshkar
Teesri Aankh	1885	"Superman"	Laxmikant-Pyarelal	Anand Bakshi	Asha Bhosle
Vidhaata	1886	"Saat Saheliyan Khadi Khadi"	Kalyanji-Anandji	Anand Bakshi	Alka Yagnik, Anuradha Paudwal, Sadhana Sargam, Kanchan, Hemlata, Shivangi Kolhapure, Padmini Kolhapure
Waqt Ke Shehzade	1887	"Tere Liye Chandi Ka Bangla"	Usha Khanna	Indeevar	Usha Khanna
Waqt Ke Shehzade	1888	"I Love You"	Usha Khanna	Indeevar	Usha Khanna
Waqt Waqt Ki Baat	1889	"Ek Dil Sau Dushman"	Rajesh Roshan	Anjaan	solo
Waqt Waqt Ki Baat	1890	"O Saathi Aa Re"	Rajesh Roshan	Anjaan	Lata Mangeshkar
Waqt Waqt Ki Baat	1891	"Tujhko Hi Woh Haque Hai"	Rajesh Roshan	Anjaan	Asha Bhosle
Yeh Vaada Raha	1892	"Jeene Ko Toh Jeete Hain Sabhi"	R D Burman	Gulshan Bawra	Asha Bhosle
Yeh Vaada Raha	1893	"Ishq Mera Bandagi Hain"	R D Burman	Gulshan Bawra	Asha Bhosle
Yeh Vaada Raha	1894	"Tu Tu Hain Wohi"	R D Burman	Gulshan Bawra	Asha Bhosle
Yeh Vaada Raha	1895	"Maine Tujhe Kabhi Kuchh Kaha Tha"	R D Burman	Gulshan Bawra	Asha Bhosle
Yeh Vaada Raha	1896	"Aisa Kabhi Hua Nahin"	R D Burman	Gulshan Bawra	solo

==== 1983 ====
Film	No.	Song	Composer(s)	Writer(s)	Co-artist(s)
Aao Baby Pyaar Karen	1897	"Mujhe Le Lo"	Laxmikant-Pyarelal	N/A	solo
Aao Baby Pyaar Karen	1898	"Tumhi To Ho"	Laxmikant-Pyarelal	N/A	solo
Ab Meri Baari	1899	"Socha Na Hum Tumhen"	Bappi Lahiri	N/A	Asha Bhosle, Mohammad Rafi, Lata Mangeshkar
Agar Tum Na Hote	1900	"Sach Hai Yeh Koi Ilzaam Nahin"	R. D. Burman	Gulshan Bawra	solo
Agar Tum Na Hote	1901	"Agar Tum Na Hote" (male)	R. D. Burman	Gulshan Bawra	solo
Agar Tum Na Hote	1902	"Agar Tum Na Hote" (sad)	R. D. Burman	Gulshan Bawra	solo
Andhaa Kaanoon	1903	"Yeh Andhaa Kanoon Hai"	Laxmikant-Pyarelal	Anand Bakshi	solo
Andhaa Kaanoon	1904	"Rote Rote Hansna Sikho" (male)	Laxmikant-Pyarelal	Anand Bakshi	solo
Andhaa Kaanoon	1905	"Rote Rote Hansna Sikho" (sad)	Laxmikant-Pyarelal	Anand Bakshi	solo
Andhaa Kaanoon	1906	"Meri Behna Deewani Hai"	Laxmikant-Pyarelal	Anand Bakshi	Asha Bhosle
Arpan	1907	"Meri Teri Shaadi Hogi"	Laxmikant-Pyarelal	Anand Bakshi	Lata Mangeshkar
Avtaar	1908	"Din Mahine Saal"	Laxmikant-Pyarelal	Anand Bakshi	Lata Mangeshkar
Avtaar	1909	"Yaar Utho Chalo"	Laxmikant-Pyarelal	Anand Bakshi	Mahendra Kapoor
Avtaar	1910	"Ooparwale Tera Jawab Nahin"	Laxmikant-Pyarelal	Anand Bakshi	solo
Avtaar	1911	"Yeh Saari Duniya Hai Aati Jaati"	Laxmikant-Pyarelal	Anand Bakshi	solo
Azaad	1912	"Mere Yaaron Ka Kehna Hai"	Kalyanji-Anandji	N/A	solo
Bade Dil Wala	1913	"Kahin Na Jaa"	R. D. Burman	Majrooh Sultanpuri	Lata Mangeshkar
Bade Dil Wala	1914	"Kaho Kaise Raasta Bhool Gaye"	R. D. Burman	Majrooh Sultanpuri	Lata Mangeshkar
Bade Dil Wala	1915	"Tujh Mein Kya Hai Deewana"	R. D. Burman	Majrooh Sultanpuri	Lata Mangeshkar
Bade Dil Wala	1916	"Jeevan Ke Din" (male)	R. D. Burman	Majrooh Sultanpuri	solo
Bade Dil Wala	1917	"Aaya Sanam Aaya Tera Deewana"	R. D. Burman	Majrooh Sultanpuri	solo
Bandhan Kuchchey Dhaagon Ka	1918	"Piya Tohe Laaj Nahin Aave"	Hemant Bhosle	Anjaan	Asha Bhosle
Bandhan Kuchchey Dhaagon Ka	1919	"Yeh Bandhan Kachche Dhagon Ka (Duet)"	Hemant Bhosle	Anjaan	Lata Mangeshkar
Bandhan Kuchchey Dhaagon Ka	1920	"Yeh Bandhan Kachche Dhagon Ka (Male)"	Hemant Bhosle	Anjaan	solo
Bekaraar	1921	"Maine Yeh Faisala Kar Liya Hai"	Laxmikant-Pyarelal	Anand Bakshi	Asha Bhosle
Bekaraar	1922	"Tum Chale Aaye Ho"	Laxmikant-Pyarelal	Anand Bakshi	Asha Bhosle
Bekhabar	1923	"Love Ke Matlab Prem"	Usha Khanna	Prem, Sameer	Usha Khanna
Bura Admi	1924	"Lafda Karega Bankas Karega"	Bappi Lahiri	Indeevar	solo
Chatpati	1925	"Aa Humsafar Pyaar Ki Sej Par"	Basu–Manohari	Yogesh	Lata Mangeshkar
Chor Mandali	1926	"Janeman Janejaan"	Kalyanji-Anandji	G. L. Rawal	Mukesh, Hemlata
Dard Ka Rishta	1927	"Yun Neend Se Woh"	R. D. Burman	Anand Bakshi	solo
Dard Ka Rishta	1928	"Baap Ki Jagah Maa"	R. D. Burman	Anand Bakshi	solo
Dard Ka Rishta	1929	"Baap Ki Jagah Maa" (slow)	R. D. Burman	Anand Bakshi	solo
Darpok	1930	"Manzilein Kahan Hai"	Anu Malik	Anjaan	solo
Darpok	1931	"Pyar Kya Hai"	Anu Malik	Anjaan	solo
Darpok	1932	"Pyar Se Kaho To"	Anu Malik	Anjaan	solo
Daulat Ke Dushman	1933	"Jeena To Hai Par"	R. D. Burman	Majrooh Sultanpuri	solo
Daulat Ke Dushman	1934	"Jo Bhi Hua Hai"	R. D. Burman	Majrooh Sultanpuri	solo
Daulat Ke Dushman	1935	"Jaana Hai Humen Toh"	R. D. Burman	Majrooh Sultanpuri	Lata Mangeshkar
Daulat Ke Dushman	1936	"Hum Toh Hai Sabke Yaar"	R. D. Burman	Majrooh Sultanpuri	Asha Bhosle
Do Gulaab	1937	"Jab Do Dil Takrayenge"	Bappi Lahiri	Indeevar	Asha Bhosle
Do Gulaab	1938	"Mere Liye Tu Bani"	Bappi Lahiri	Indeevar	Asha Bhosle
Do Gulaab	1939	"Come Near"	Bappi Lahiri	Indeevar	Asha Bhosle
Do Shabd	1940	"Do Silon Ka Saathiya"	N/A	N/A	Asha Bhosle
Doosri Dulhan	1941	"Lamha Lamha"	Bappi Lahiri	Amit Khanna	solo
Drummer	1942	"Suno Ji Sun Lo"	N/A	N/A	solo
Ek Jaan Hain Hum	1943	"Dil Lagana Tum Kya Jaano"	Anu Malik	Anjaan	Asha Bhosle
Faraib	1944	"Yeh Mausam Pyaar Ka"	Bappi Lahiri	Indeevar	Asha Bhosle
Faraib	1945	"Apne Liye Hi Jeena Kya Jeena"	Bappi Lahiri	Indeevar	solo
Faraib	1946	"Baandho Nahi Rasmon Se"	Bappi Lahiri	Indeevar	solo
Film Hi Film	1947	"Jeene Ki Ek Adaa Hai"	Bappi Lahiri	Indeevar	solo
Haadsa	1948	"Tu Kya Jaane"	Kalyanji-Anandji	M. G. Hashmat	solo
Haadsa	1949	"Yeh Vaada Karo"	Kalyanji-Anandji	M. G. Hashmat	Asha Bhosle
Himmatwala	1950	"Ladki Nahin Hai Tu"	Bappi Lahiri	Indeevar	Asha Bhosle
Himmatwala	1951	"Taaki O Taaki"	Bappi Lahiri	Indeevar	Asha Bhosle
Himmatwala	1952	"Waah Waah Khel Shuru"	Bappi Lahiri	Indeevar	Asha Bhosle
Himmatwala	1953	"Nainon Mein Sapna"	Bappi Lahiri	Indeevar	Lata Mangeshkar
Hum Se Hai Zamana	1954	"Gulstakhi Maaf Ho"	Raam Laxman	Ravinder Rawal	Asha Bhosle
Hum Se Na Jeeta Koi	1955	"Kholke Rakhna Darwaza"	Bappi Lahiri	Anjaan	Asha Bhosle
Hum Se Na Jeeta Koi	1956	"Hum Se Na Jeeta Koi"	Bappi Lahiri	Farooq Kaiser	Mahendra Kapoor
Hum Se Na Jeeta Koi	1957	"O Kudi Aankhen Milake"	Bappi Lahiri	Farooq Kaiser	solo
Jaani Dost	1958	"Jawaani Jawaani Jalti Hai"	Bappi Lahiri	Indeevar	Asha Bhosle
Jaani Dost	1959	"Hum Nahin Jhoomte Hai"	Bappi Lahiri	Indeevar	Asha Bhosle
Jaani Dost	1960	"Jeevan Bana Jeevan"	Bappi Lahiri	Indeevar	Asha Bhosle
Jaani Dost	1961	"Baaghon Ki Tu Rani Hai"	Bappi Lahiri	Indeevar	Asha Bhosle
Jaani Dost	1962	"Aayi Aayi Main Toh Aayi"	Bappi Lahiri	Indeevar	Asha Bhosle
Jeena Hai Pyaar Mein	1963	"Jeena Hai Pyaar Mein"	Basu–Manohari	Naqsh Lyallpur	Asha Bhosle
Jeena Hai Pyaar Mein	1964	"Na Zindagi Mili"	Basu–Manohari	Naqsh Lyallpur	solo
Jeena Hai Pyaar Mein	1965	"Gham Ki Raahon Mein"	Basu–Manohari	Naqsh Lyallpur	solo
Jeena Hai Pyaar Mein	1966	"Pyaar Ka Diwana" (version 1)	Basu–Manohari	Naqsh Lyallpur	solo
Jeena Hai Pyaar Mein	1967	"Pyaar Ka Diwana" (version 2)	Basu–Manohari	Naqsh Lyallpur	solo
Jeet Hamaari	1968	"Har Kadam Par Khushi"	Bappi Lahiri	Indeevar	solo
Justice Chaudhury	1969	"Zindagi Ki Pehli Zaroorat Hai"	Bappi Lahiri	Indeevar	Lata Mangeshkar
Justice Chaudhury	1970	"Lakshmi O Lakshmi"	Bappi Lahiri	Indeevar	Asha Bhosle
Justice Chaudhury	1971	"Mama Miya Pom Pom"	Bappi Lahiri	Indeevar	Asha Bhosle
Justice Chaudhury	1972	"Saath Mere Aaogi"	Bappi Lahiri	Indeevar	Asha Bhosle
Justice Chaudhury	1973	"Maine Tujhe Chhua"	Bappi Lahiri	Indeevar	Asha Bhosle
Justice Chaudhury	1974	"Insaaf Ki Kursi"	Bappi Lahiri	Indeevar	solo
Kalaakaar	1975	"Khoye Khoye Rahen Teri"	Kalyanji-Anandji	Indeevar	Anuradha Paudwal
Kalaakaar	1976	"Gori Teri Jawani Pe"	Kalyanji-Anandji	Indeevar	solo
Kalaakaar	1977	"Neele Neele Ambar Par" (Male)	Kalyanji-Anandji	Indeevar	solo
Kalyug Ki Sita	1978	"Aaj Bahaar Jaa Rahi Hain"	Laxmikant-Pyarelal	N/A	solo
Karate	1979	"Maa Ae Maa"	Bappi Lahiri	S. H. Bihari	Amit Kumar
Karate	1980	"Do Diwane Pyaar Ke"	Bappi Lahiri	S. H. Bihari	Amit Kumar
Katha	1981	"Maine Tumse Kuchh Nahin Maanga"	Raj Kamal	Indu Jain	solo
Kaun? Kaisey?	1982	"Main Akela Aur Dilbar"	R. D. Burman	Gulshan Bawra	solo
Kaun? Kaisey?	1983	"Aao Mere Paas"	R. D. Burman	Gulshan Bawra	solo
Khushi	1984	"Tum Jabse Gum Ho Gaye"	Asit Ganguly	Yogesh	solo
Lalach	1985	"Mausam Mastana Hai"	Bappi Lahiri	Anjaan	Lata Mangeshkar
Lalach	1986	"Apni Gaadi Chalti Hai"	Bappi Lahiri	Farooq Kaiser	Suresh Wadkar, Manna Dey
Lalach	1987	"Gaao Re Gaao"	Bappi Lahiri	Farooq Kaiser	solo
Mahaan	1988	"Asli Kya Hai"	R. D. Burman	Anjaan	Amit Kumar
Mahaan	1989	"Pyaar Mein Dil Pe Maar De Goli"	R. D. Burman	Anjaan	Asha Bhosle
Mahaan	1990	"Jidhar Dekhoon Teri Tasveer"	R. D. Burman	Anjaan	solo
Mahaan	1991	"Adhi Baat Ho Chuki"	R. D. Burman	Anjaan	solo
Mahaan	1992	"Har Chhori Rani"	R. D. Burman	Anjaan	solo
Main Awara Hoon	1993	"Kisike Bewafai Ka"	R. D. Burman	Anand Bakshi	solo
Main Awara Hoon	1994	"Main Awara Hoon"	R. D. Burman	Anand Bakshi	solo
Main Awara Hoon	1995	"Pyaar Kise Kehte Hain"	R. D. Burman	Anand Bakshi	Asha Bhosle
Main Awara Hoon	1996	"Boloji Kaisi Kahi"	R. D. Burman	Anand Bakshi	Alka Yagnik
Mangal Pandey	1997	"Surkh Jodaa Pahenkar"	Anu Malik	Hasrat Jaipuri	solo
Mawaali	1998	"Rama Rama Re"	Bappi Lahiri	Indeevar	solo
Mawaali	1999	"Jhopdi Mein Charpai"	Bappi Lahiri	Indeevar	Asha Bhosle
Mawaali	2000	"Baap ki Kasam"	Bappi Lahiri	Indeevar	Asha Bhosle
Mawaali	2001	"Ek Ek Do Do"	Bappi Lahiri	Indeevar	Asha Bhosle
Mawaali	2002	"Ooi Amma Ooi Amma"	Bappi Lahiri	Indeevar	Asha Bhosle
Mehndi	2003	"Pichhli Yaad Bhula Do"	Khayyam	Verma Malik	solo
Mujhe Vachan Do	2004	"Pehli Gali Se Doosri"	Raam Laxman	Ravinder Rawal	solo
Mujhe Vachan Do	2005	"Aapki Khidmat Mein"	Raam Laxman	Ravinder Rawal	Asha Bhosle
Mujhe Vachan Do	2006	"Tumhare Upar Apun Ka Dil"	Raam Laxman	Ravinder Rawal	Asha Bhosle
Nastik	2007	"Aaj Ka Yeh Din"	Kalyanji-Anandji	Anand Bakshi	solo
Nastik	2008	"Dulha Dulhan Ki Jodi"	Kalyanji-Anandji	Anand Bakshi	solo
Naukar Biwi Ka	2009	"Zamana To Hai Naukar Biwi Ka"	Bappi Lahiri	Anjaan	Nishi Kohli
Naukar Biwi Ka	2010	"Yaar Mila O Baba Pyaar Mila"	Bappi Lahiri	Anjaan	Asha Bhosle
Naukar Biwi Ka	2011	"Kya Naam Hai Tera"	Bappi Lahiri	Anjaan	Asha Bhosle
Nikamma	2012	"Jaane Jaan Duniya Se"	R. D. Burman	Gulshan Bawra	solo
Nikamma	2013	"Koi Shamma Sheeshe Ki"	R. D. Burman	Gulshan Bawra	solo
Nikamma	2014	"Gao Senorita"	R. D. Burman	Gulshan Bawra	Asha Bhosle, Mohammad Rafi
Nikamma	2015	"Tere Bina Main Kuch Bhi Nahin"	R. D. Burman	Gulshan Bawra	Asha Bhosle
Nishaan	2016	"Akhiyon Ki Akhiyon Mein"	Rajesh Roshan	Gulshan Bawra	Lata Mangeshkar
Nishaan	2017	"Beliya Ab Ki Yeh Bahaar"	Rajesh Roshan	Gulshan Bawra	Lata Mangeshkar
Nishaan	2018	"Humsa Na Payegi"	Rajesh Roshan	Gulshan Bawra	Lata Mangeshkar
Nishaan	2019	"Lahron Ki Tarah"	Rajesh Roshan	Gulshan Bawra	solo
Nishaan	2020	"Sun Sun Sun"	Rajesh Roshan	Gulshan Bawra	Asha Bhosle
Painter Babu	2021	"Painter Babu I Love You"	Uttam-Jagdish	Manoj Kumar	Lata Mangeshkar
Pehredaar	2022	"Aha Mujhe Dard Uthe"	Sapan-Jagmohan	Mahendra Dalvi	Asha Bhosle
Prem Tapasya	2023	"Mere Chand Ko Chand Ne Dekha"	Laxmikant-Pyarelal	Anand Bakshi	Asha Bhosle
Prem Tapasya	2024	"Devi Kuchh To Bolo"	Laxmikant-Pyarelal	Anand Bakshi	Asha Bhosle
Pukar	2025	"Jaane Jigar Duniya Mein Tu"	R. D. Burman	Gulshan Bawra	R. D. Burman
Pukar	2026	"Bachke Rehna Re Baba"	R. D. Burman	Gulshan Bawra	Asha Bhosle, R. D. Burman
Pyaas	2027	"Om Namah Shivay (Male)"	Bappi Lahiri	Kulwant Jani	solo
Pyaas	2028	"Phool Chahiye Na Gulzar" (sad)	Bappi Lahiri	Kulwant Jani	solo
Pyaas	2029	"Phool Chahiye Na Gulzar"	Bappi Lahiri	Kulwant Jani	Manna Dey
Pyaas	2030	"Saath Mera Chhod Kar"	Bappi Lahiri	Shiv Kumar Saroj	solo
Pyaasi Aankhen	2031	"Ek Mehbooba Ek Mehboob Thi"	Usha Khanna	Indeevar	solo
Pyaasi Aankhen	2032	"Jogi Jog Chhad Je"	Usha Khanna	Indeevar	Usha Khanna
Pyaasi Aankhen	2033	"Raat Adhi Ho Gayi"	Usha Khanna	Indeevar	Asha Bhosle
Rishta Kagaz Ka	2034	"Kya Ho Gaya Mujhe"	Rajesh Roshan	Majrooh Sultanpuri	Asha Bhosle
Rishta Kagaz Ka	2035	"Allah Teri Shaan"	Rajesh Roshan	Majrooh Sultanpuri	Lata Mangeshkar
Souten	2036	"Meri Pehle Hi Tang Thi Choli"	Usha Khanna	Sawan Kumar Tak	Anuradha Paudwal
Souten	2037	"Shaayad Meri Shadi Ka Khayal"	Usha Khanna	Sawan Kumar Tak	Lata Mangeshkar
Souten	2038	"Sasu Tirath Sasuma Tirath"	Usha Khanna	Sawan Kumar Tak	solo
Souten	2039	"Zindagi Pyaar Ka Geet Hai" (male)	Usha Khanna	Sawan Kumar Tak	solo
Souten	2040	"Zindagi Pyaar Ka Geet Hai" (male, part 2)	Usha Khanna	Sawan Kumar Tak	solo
Sweekar Kiya Maine	2041	"Kamai To Bahut"	Usha Khanna	Vitthalbhai Patel	Asha Bhosle
Sweekar Kiya Maine	2042	"Chand Ke Paas Jo Sitara Hai"	Usha Khanna	Usha Khanna	Lata Mangeshkar
Taqdeer	2043	"Ya Ali Ya Ali"	Kalyanji-Anandji	Farooq Kaiser	Mahendra Kapoor
Taqdeer	2044	"Kyun Aise Dekha Aapne"	Kalyanji-Anandji	Indeevar	solo
Woh 7 Din	2045	"Mere Dilse Dillagi Na Kar"	Laxmikant-Pyarelal	Anand Bakshi	Anuradha Paudwal
Woh Jo Hasina	2046	"Chand Chal Tu Zara Dheeme"	Raam Laxman	Ravinder Rawal	solo
Woh Jo Hasina	2047	"Chand Chal Tu Zara Dheeme (Sad)"	Raam Laxman	Ravinder Rawal	solo
Zara Si Zindagi	2048	"Ghar Se School"	Laxmikant-Pyarelal	Anand Bakshi	Bharat, Pankaj Udhas

==== 1984 ====
Film	No.	Song	Composer(s)	Writer(s)	Co-artist(s)
Aaj Ka M.L.A. Ram Avtar	2049	"Tirupati Balaji"	Bappi Lahiri	Indeevar	solo
Aaj Ka M.L.A. Ram Avtar	2050	"Main Toh Hoon Shree Ramavtar"	Bappi Lahiri	Indeevar	solo
Aaj Ka M.L.A. Ram Avtar	2051	"Tukur Tukur Dekha Karoon"	Bappi Lahiri	Indeevar	Asha Bhosle
Aan Aur Shaan	2052	"Sehari Babu Hai Mera Yaar"	R. D. Burman	Majrooh Sultanpuri	Asha Bhosle
Aan Aur Shaan	2053	"Haseenon Ki Hai Yeh Shaam"	R. D. Burman	Majrooh Sultanpuri	solo
Aasmaan	2054	"Ban Ke Nazar Dil Ki Zubaan" (Part 1)	Anu Malik	Anand Bakshi	solo
Aasmaan	2055	"Ban Ke Nazar Dil Ki Zubaan" (Part 2)	Anu Malik	Anand Bakshi	solo
Aasmaan	2056	"Mere Karib Jo Aayega"	Anu Malik	Anand Bakshi	Asha Bhosle
Aasmaan	2057	"Tere Nain Hai Kaise"	Anu Malik	Anand Bakshi	Asha Bhosle
Ab Ayega Mazaa	2058	"Solah Baras Ki Kamsin Umariya"	Anand-Milind	Sameer	Asha Bhosle
Ab Ayega Mazaa	2059	"Kab Jaane Anjaane Begane Deewane"	Anand-Milind	Sameer	Asha Bhosle
Aa Jaao Ghar Tumhara	2060	"Tu Hi Tu Meri"	Kalyanji Anandji	Anjaan	solo
Akalmand	2061	"Meri Biwi Maike Chali Gayi"	Laxmikant-Pyarelal	Anand Bakshi	solo
Akalmand	2062	"Ek Din Ki Baat Hai"	Laxmikant-Pyarelal	Anand Bakshi	solo
Akalmand	2063	"I Love You"	Laxmikant-Pyarelal	Anand Bakshi	Asha Bhosle
All Rounder	2064	"O Re Babuaa" (version 1)	Laxmikant-Pyarelal	Anand Bakshi	Jaspal Singh
All Rounder	2065	"O Re Babuaa" (version 2)	Laxmikant-Pyarelal	Anand Bakshi	solo
Anand Aur Anand	2066	"Hum Kya Hai Ye Tumne"	R D Burman	Anjaan	Penaz Masani
Anand Aur Anand	2067	"Wadon Ki Shaam Aayi"	R D Burman	Anjaan	Asha Bhosle, Abhijeet Bhattacharya
Anand Aur Anand	2068	"Mere Liye Soona Soona"	R D Burman	Anjaan	solo
Anand Aur Anand	2069	"Lag Jaa Gale Se"	R D Burman	Anjaan	Shailendra Singh, Dilraj Kaur
Asha Jyoti	2070	"Tere Paayal Ki Jhankaar"	Laxmikant-Pyarelal	Anjaan	Anuradha Paudwal
Asha Jyoti	2071	"Neele Ambar Ke Do Naina"	Laxmikant-Pyarelal	Anjaan	solo
Asha Jyoti	2072	"Mehboob Se Mehbooba Mil Gayi"	Laxmikant-Pyarelal	Anjaan	Asha Bhosle
Awaaz	2073	"Zindagi Sau Baras Ki Sahi" (duet)	R D Burman	Anand Bakshi	Asha Bhosle
Awaaz	2074	"Bolo Pyaar Karogi"	R D Burman	Anand Bakshi	Asha Bhosle
Awaaz	2075	"Aankhon Ki Zubaan Mein"	R D Burman	Anand Bakshi	Asha Bhosle
Awaaz	2076	"Are Aa Janeman"	R D Burman	Anand Bakshi	solo
Awaaz	2077	"Zindagi Sau Baras Ki" (male)	R D Burman	Anand Bakshi	solo
Baazi	2078	"Gupchup Hai Mummy"	Laxmikant-Pyarelal	Anand Bakshi	Asha Bhosle, Shivangi Kolhapure, Rajeshwari
Baazi	2079	"Noora De De"	Laxmikant-Pyarelal	Anand Bakshi	Asha Bhosle
Bandh Honth	2080	"Kal Ka Kya Bharosa"	Kalyanji-Anandji	Indeevar	solo
Boxer	2081	"Dekho Idhar Jaane Jigar"	R D Burman	Gulshan Bawra	solo
Boxer	2082	"Tere Dil Mein Bhi Kuch"	R D Burman	Gulshan Bawra	Asha Bhosle
Dharm Aur Qanoon	2083	"Dil Se Dil Ki Baat Ho Gayi"	Kalyanji-Anandji	Anjaan	Asha Bhosle
Dharm Aur Qanoon	2084	"Badi Door Se Aaya Banna"	Kalyanji-Anandji	Anjaan	Manhar Udhaas, Alka Yagnik
Dilawar	2085	"Ek Ladke Ne Kahi"	Manas Mukherjee	Mahendra Dalvi	Asha Bhosle
Duniya	2086	"Jhoomti Raat Jawaan"	R D Burman	Javed Akhtar	Asha Bhosle, Mahendra Kapoor
Duniya	2087	"Gehre Halke Halke Gehre"	R D Burman	Javed Akhtar	Lata Mangeshkar
Duniya	2088	"Tu Chand Nagar Ke Shahzaadi"	R D Burman	Javed Akhtar	solo
Duniya	2089	"Main Aur Meri Awargi"	R D Burman	Javed Akhtar	solo
Duniya	2090	"Duniya Bahut Hi Kamaal Ki Hai"	R D Burman	Javed Akhtar	solo
Farishta	2091	"Zamane Mein Koi Hamara Nahin"	R D Burman	Anand Bakshi	solo
Gangvaa	2092	"Angara Hoon Main"	Bappi Lahiri	Indeevar	Asha Bhosle
Ghar Ek Mandir	2093	"Kabse Khada Main Tere Liye"	Laxmikant-Pyarelal	Anand Bakshi	Asha Bhosle
Ghar Ek Mandir	2094	"Bum Babum Babum Baabi"	Laxmikant-Pyarelal	Anand Bakshi	solo
Grahasthi	2095	"Kisi Pehlu Se Lage Na"	Ravindra Jain	Ravindra Jain	Anuradha Paudwal
Haisiyat	2096	"Jaagi Jaagi Re Jaagi"	Bappi Lahiri	Farooq Kaiser	Lata Mangeshkar
Haisiyat	2097	"Daftar Ko Der Ho Gai"	Bappi Lahiri	Indeevar	Asha Bhosle
Haisiyat	2098	"Uttar Meuin Dekhoon Toh"	Bappi Lahiri	Indeevar	Asha Bhosle
Hanste Khelte	2099	"Pyaar Kiya Hai Karenge"	Govind-Naresh	Yogesh	Sulakshana Pandit
Hanste Khelte	2100	"Hanste Khelte"	Govind-Naresh	Yogesh	Usha Mangeshkar, Amit Kumar, Suresh Wadkar, Bhupinder Singh
Hum Hain Lajawab	2101	"Danke Ki Chot Se"	R D Burman	Anand Bakshi	solo
Hum Hain Lajawab	2102	"Main Dariya Hoon"	R D Burman	Anand Bakshi	solo
Hum Rahe Na Hum	2103	"Miya Biwi Dono Ho Raazi"	Bappi Lahiri	Kaifi Azmi	
Hum Rahe Na Hum	2104	"Mummy Aisi Papa Aise"	Bappi Lahiri	Kaifi Azmi	Suresh Wadkar, Dilraj Kaur
Hum Rahe Na Hum	2105	"Roshan Roshan Raaten Apni"	Bappi Lahiri	Kaifi Azmi	Asha Bhosle
Inquilaab	2106	"Aaj Abhi Yahin"	Laxmikant-Pyarelal	Anand Bakshi	Asha Bhosle
Inquilaab	2107	"Bichhoo Lad Gaya"	Laxmikant-Pyarelal	Anand Bakshi	Asha Bhosle
Inquilaab	2108	"Lo Main Ban Gaya Thanedaar"	Laxmikant-Pyarelal	Anand Bakshi	solo
Inquilaab	2109	"Disco 84"	Laxmikant-Pyarelal	Anand Bakshi	solo
Inquilaab	2110	"Abhimanyu Chakrvyuh Mein"	Laxmikant-Pyarelal	Anand Bakshi	solo
Inteha	2111	"Hash De Ek Kash" (part 1)	Rajesh Roshan	Rajesh Roshan	solo
Inteha	2112	"Hash De Ek Kash" (part 2)	Rajesh Roshan	Rajesh Roshan	solo
Jaag Utha Insan	2113	"Teri Zindagi Ke Ragini Par"	Rajesh Roshan	Indeevar	Asha Bhosle
Jaag Utha Insan	2114	"Aayi Parbaton Pe Jhoomti"	Rajesh Roshan	Indeevar	Asha Bhosle
Jagir	2115	"Naya Naya Hota Hai"	R D Burman	Anand Bakshi	Asha Bhosle
Jagir	2116	"Chor Tera Naam Hai"	R D Burman	Anand Bakshi	Lata Mangeshkar
Jagir	2117	"Hum Dilwale Saari Duniya Se Nurale"	R D Burman	Anand Bakshi	Shailendra Singh, Shakti Thakur
Jagir	2118	"Shahron Mein Se Shehar Suna"	R D Burman	Anand Bakshi	solo
Jeevan Sandhya	2119	"Badi Hai Bekarari"	Ajit Varman	Suraj Sanim	solo
Jeevan Sandhya	2120	"Badi Hai Beqarari"	Ajit Varman	Suraj Sanim	solo
Jeevan Sandhya	2121	"Lage Hai Har Taraf"	Ajit Varman	Suraj Sanim	solo
Jhutha Sach	2122	"Kaisi Lag Rahi Hoon Main"	R D Burman	Majrooh Sultanpuri	Lata Mangeshkar
Jhutha Sach	2123	"Kisi Ko Khona"	R D Burman	Majrooh Sultanpuri	Asha Bhosle, Preeti Sagar, Priya
Kaamyab	2124	"Ek Baar Dekha Toh"	Bappi Lahiri	Indeevar	Asha Bhosle
Kaamyab	2125	"Ek Number Ka Ladka"	Bappi Lahiri	Indeevar	Asha Bhosle
Kaamyab	2126	"Chhoti Chhoti Dikhti Thi"	Bappi Lahiri	Indeevar	Asha Bhosle
Kaamyab	2127	"Dhakkam Dhakka Hua"	Bappi Lahiri	Indeevar	Asha Bhosle
Karishmaa	2128	"Khol Doongi Dil Ka Taala"	R D Burman	Gulshan Bawra	Asha Bhosle
Karishmaa	2129	"Teri Nazar Se Meri Nazar Ka"	R D Burman	Gulshan Bawra	Asha Bhosle
Karishmaa	2130	"Jaan Meri Tere Liye"	R D Burman	Gulshan Bawra	solo
Laila	2131	"Ho Gaye Diwane"	Usha Khanna	Saawan Kumar Tak	solo
Laila	2132	"Doston Ki Haqeeqat"	Usha Khanna	Saawan Kumar Tak	solo
Love Marriage	2133	"Murgiwalon Apni Murgiyan Sambhalo"	Anu Malik	Hasrat Jaipuri	solo
Maqsad	2134	"Devi O Baby"	Bappi Lahiri	Indeevar	solo
Maqsad	2135	"Gussa Chhod Dil Na Tod"	Bappi Lahiri	Indeevar	solo
Maqsad	2136	"Aa Jaao Nagraj"	Bappi Lahiri	Indeevar	solo
Maqsad	2137	"Garmi Hai Kahan Hai"	Bappi Lahiri	Indeevar	S Janaki
Maqsad	2138	"Pyaar Tumne Kiya Na Ho Toh"	Bappi Lahiri	Indeevar	Asha Bhosle
Mashaal	2139	"Zindagi Aa Raha Hoon Main"	Hridaynath Mangeshkar	Javed Akhtar	solo
Mashaal	2140	"Holi Aayee Re"	Hridaynath Mangeshkar	Javed Akhtar	Lata Mangeshkar, Mahendra Kapoor
Mashaal	2141	"Mujhe Tum Yaad Karna"	Hridaynath Mangeshkar	Javed Akhtar	Lata Mangeshkar
Meraa Dost Meraa Dushman	2142	"Kaise Bedardi Se Aankh Ladi"	Laxmikant-Pyarelal	Anand Bakshi	Asha Bhosle
Meraa Dost Meraa Dushman	2143	"Ek Tara Jogi Aaya"	Laxmikant-Pyarelal	Anand Bakshi	solo
Meri Adalat	2144	"You Are Beautiful"	Bappi Lahiri	Indeevar	Asha Bhosle
Naya Kadam	2145	"Saaila Aaya More Mann Bhaaya"	Bappi Lahiri	Indeevar	Asha Bhosle
Naya Kadam	2146	"Zindagi Ka Hum Naya Itihaas Likhenge"	Bappi Lahiri	Indeevar	Asha Bhosle
Naya Kadam	2147	"Raam Ho Tum Kya Patthar"	Bappi Lahiri	Indeevar	Asha Bhosle
Naya Kadam	2148	"Phool Jahan Jahan Bahaar Wahan"	Bappi Lahiri	Indeevar	Asha Bhosle
Pakhandee	2149	"Tu Jab Bhi Dekhega"	Laxmikant-Pyarelal	Majrooh Sultanpuri	Asha Bhosle
Papi Pet Ka Sawaal Hai	2150	"Papi Pet Ka Sawaal Hai" (version 1)	Shankar-Jaikishan	Vishweshwar Sharma	Lata Mangeshkar
Papi Pet Ka Sawaal Hai	2151	"Papi Pet Ka Sawaal Hai" (version 2)	Shankar-Jaikishan	Vishweshwar Sharma	Lata Mangeshkar
Papi Pet Ka Sawaal Hai	2152	"Jab Dushman Ho Gaya Waqt"	Shankar-Jaikishan	Vishweshwar Sharma	solo
Papi Pet Ka Sawaal Hai	2153	"Aaj Ki Duniya Mein"	Shankar-Jaikishan	Suresh Wadkar	M. G. Hashmat
Pet Pyaar Aur Paap	2154	"Shehron Ki Galiyon Mein"	Bappi Lahiri	Bhushan Banmali	solo
Qaidi	2155	"Jawaani Ka Khazana"	Bappi Lahiri	Indeevar	Asha Bhosle
Qaidi	2156	"Chandni Raat Hai Sanam"	Bappi Lahiri	Indeevar	Asha Bhosle
Qaidi	2157	"Sanwali Hai Mujhe Pyar"	Bappi Lahiri	Indeevar	Asha Bhosle
Qaidi	2158	"Komal Madhur Chapal Chatur"	Bappi Lahiri	Indeevar	Lata Mangeshkar
Raaj Tilak	2159	"Aa Gaye Rang Jamane Wale"	Kalyanji-Anandji	Verma Malik	Anuradha Paudwal, Sadhana Sargam, Alka Yagnik
Raaj Tilak	2160	"Julam Ho Gaya Re"	Kalyanji-Anandji	Verma Malik	Sadhana Sargam, Alka Yagnik
Raja Aur Rana	2161	"Aji Sunte Ho"	Bappi Lahiri	Verma Malik	Mahesh Kanodia
Ram Ki Ganga	2162	"Om Namah Shivay"	Hridaynath Mangeshkar	M. G. Hashmat, Narendra Sharma	Asha Bhosle, Jagdeep
Sasural	2163	"Na Jaane Kab Kaise"	Ravindra Jain	Ravindra Jain	Hemlata
Sasural	2164	"Aaj Main Bahut Khush Hoon"	Ravindra Jain	Ravindra Jain	Sadhana Singh
Sharaabi	2165	"Jahan Chaar Yaar Mil Jaaye"	Bappi Lahiri	Prakash Mehra, Anjaan	Amitabh Bachchan
Sharaabi	2166	"De De Pyaar De" (male)	Bappi Lahiri	solo	Anjaan
Sharaabi	2167	"Manzilein Apni Jagah Hain"	Bappi Lahiri	solo	Prakash Mehra
Sharaabi	2168	"Inteha Ho Gayi"	Bappi Lahiri	Anjaan	Asha Bhosle
Sharaabi	2169	"Mujhe Naulakha Maanga De"	Bappi Lahiri	Anjaan	Asha Bhosle
Tarkeeb	2170	"Chhuk Chhuk Gaadi"	Bappi Lahiri	Anjaan	Asha Bhosle
Tarkeeb	2171	"Palkon Ke Neeche Se"	Bappi Lahiri	Anjaan	solo
Teri Baahon Mein	2172	"Kitne Phool Kitne Ped"	Bappi Lahiri	Amit Khanna	solo
Tohfa	2173	"Albela Mausam Kehta Hai Swagatam"	Bappi Lahiri	Indeevar	Lata Mangeshkar, Kavita Paudwal
Tohfa	2174	"Pyaar Ka Tohfa"	Bappi Lahiri	Indeevar	Asha Bhosle
Tohfa	2175	"Gori Tere Ang Ang Mein"	Bappi Lahiri	Indeevar	Asha Bhosle
Tohfa	2176	"Ek Aankh Marun Toh"	Bappi Lahiri	Indeevar	Asha Bhosle
Unchi Uraan	2177	"Raat Bheegi Jaaye" (version 1)	Jeetu-Tapan	Jan Nisar Akhtar	Asha Bhosle
Unchi Uraan	2178	"Raat Bheegi Jaaye" (version 2)	Jeetu-Tapan	Jan Nisar Akhtar	Asha Bhosle
Wanted	2179	"Tumsa Nahin Dekha"	Bappi Lahiri	Indeevar	Tina Munim
Wanted	2180	"Jaani Jaani"	Bappi Lahiri	Indeevar	Asha Bhosle
Yaadgaar	2181	"Sa Se Banta Hai Saathi"	Bappi Lahiri	Indeevar	Asha Bhosle
Yaadgaar	2182	"Aate Hai Chale Jaate Hai"	Bappi Lahiri	Anjaan	solo
Yaadgaar	2183	"Aate Hai Chale Jaate Hai" (sad)	Bappi Lahiri	Anjaan	solo
Yaadgaar	2184	"Raju Mera Naam"	Bappi Lahiri	Anjaan	solo
Yaadon Ki Zanjeer	2185	"Mumkin Hai Naiya Se"	Rajesh Roshan	Indeevar	Suman Kalyanpur
Yaadon Ki Zanjeer	2186	"Mumkin Hai Naiya Se"	Rajesh Roshan	Indeevar	Suman Kalyanpur
Yeh Desh	2187	"Meri Umar Ka Ek Ladka"	R D Burman	Anand Bakshi	Asha Bhosle
Zakhmi Sher	2188	"O Mere Honewale Bachchon Ki Amma"	Laxmikant-Pyarelal	Santosh Anand	Asha Bhosle
Zameen Aasmaan	2189	"Maano Ya Na Maano"	R D Burman	Anjaan	solo
Zameen Aasmaan	2190	"Maine Dil Diya"	R D Burman	Anjaan	Lata Mangeshkar
Zindagi Jeene Ke Liye	2191	"Udte Udte Pyaare Panchhi"	Rajesh Roshan	Rajesh Roshan	solo
Zindagi Jeene Ke Liye	2192	"Door Jaa Rahe Hain"	Rajesh Roshan	Rajesh Roshan	solo
Zindagi Jeene Ke Liye	2193	"Haathon Ne Hamesha War Kiya"	Rajesh Roshan	Rajesh Roshan	solo
Zindagi Jeene Ke Liye	2194	"Raaz-e-dil Khol De"	Rajesh Roshan	Rajesh Roshan	Asha Bhosle

==== 1985 ====
Film	No.	Song	Composer(s)	Writer(s)	Co-artist(s)
3D Saamri	2195	"Ladki Kaise Phasayi"	Bappi Lahiri	Kafil Azar	solo
Aaj Ka Daur	2196	"Petrol Bharo"	Bappi Lahiri	Indeevar	Alka Yagnik
Aaj Ka Daur	2197	"Hum Tujh Par Hi Shaida Hue Hai"	Bappi Lahiri	Indeevar	Asha Bhosle
Aaj Ka Daur	2198	"Gori Gori Gori"	Bappi Lahiri	Indeevar	Asha Bhosle
Aandhi Toofan	2199	"Peechha Tera Chhodunga Na"	Bappi Lahiri	Anjaan	Asha Bhosle
Aar Paar	2200	"Kaun Si Dariya" (male)	R D Burman		solo
Aar Paar	2201	"Gali Gali Shor Hain"	R D Burman		solo
Aar Paar	2202	"Jaiyo Na Jaiyo Na Door"	R D Burman		Sabina Yasmin
Alag Alag	2203	"Dil Mein Aag Lagaye"	R D Burman		solo
Alag Alag	2204	"Kabhi Bekasi Ne Mara"	R D Burman		solo
Alag Alag	2205	"Dil Mein Aag Lagaye" (duet)	R D Burman		Lata Mangeshkar
Alag Alag	2206	"Kuchh Humko Tumse Kehna"	R D Burman		Lata Mangeshkar
Alag Alag	2207	"Kaagaz Kalam Dawaat"	R D Burman		Lata Mangeshkar
Amber	2208	"Jhilmil Sitaron Se Naina"	Sapan-Jagmohan	Mahender Dalvi	solo
Amber	2209	"Dekha Jo Maine"	Sapan-Jagmohan	Mahender Dalvi	solo
Ameer Aadmi Gharib Aadmi	2210	"Sarkari Damad"	R D Burman	Nida Fazli	Shailendra Singh
Awara Baap	2211	"Teri Umar Pachaas Ya Pachpan"	R D Burman	Verma Malik	Amit Kumar
Awara Baap	2212	"Jamuna Ke Jal Mein"	R D Burman	M G Hashmat	solo
Awara Baap	2213	"Awara Baap Hoon" (Part 1)	R D Burman	M G Hashmat	solo
Awara Baap	2214	"Awara Baap Hoon" (Part 2)	R D Burman	M G Hashmat	solo
Baadal	2215	"Hari Haru Bhangiya Ki"	Bappi Lahiri	Anjaan	solo
Babu	2216	"Yeh Mera Jeevan" (duet)	Rajesh Roshan	Majrooh Sultanpuri	Alka Yagnik
Babu	2217	"Aisi Rang De Piya"	Rajesh Roshan	Majrooh Sultanpuri	Lata Mangeshkar
Babu	2218	"Main Kunwari Albeli"	Rajesh Roshan	Majrooh Sultanpuri	Asha Bhosle
Babu	2219	"Yeh Mera Jeevan" (Slow)	Rajesh Roshan	Majrooh Sultanpuri	solo
Balidaan	2220	"Aaja Ek Ho Jaa"	Bappi Lahiri	Indeevar	Asha Bhosle
Balidaan	2221	"Pyaar Karne Ka License"	Bappi Lahiri	Farooq Kaiser	Asha Bhosle
Bayen Haath Ka Khel	2222	"Yeh Jhooth Bolta Hai"	Laxmikant-Pyarelal	Majrooh Sultanpuri	Asha Bhosle
Bayen Haath Ka Khel	2223	"Ek Bosa Humne Maanga"	Laxmikant-Pyarelal	Majrooh Sultanpuri	Asha Bhosle
Bayen Haath Ka Khel	2224	"Kisiko Harana"	Laxmikant-Pyarelal	Majrooh Sultanpuri	Asha Bhosle
Bepanaah	2225	"Najariya Teer Chalaye"	Khayyam	Nida Fazli	Asha Bhosle
Bepanaah	2226	"Taaqat Hai Jiske Paas"	Khayyam	Nida Fazli	Mahendra Kapoor, Suresh Wadkar
Bewafai	2227	"Hum Apni Wafa"	Bappi Lahiri	Hasan Kamal	solo
Bewafai	2228	"Shukriya Dil Diya"	Bappi Lahiri	Farooq Kaiser	solo
Bond 303	2229	"Raste Mein Kal Ek Ladki Mili Thi"	R. D. Burman	Gulshan Bawra	
Bond 303	2230	"Ab Jo Hoga"	R. D. Burman	Gulshan Bawra	Asha Bhosle
Bond 303	2231	"Dil Agar Jawaan Hai"	R. D. Burman	Gulshan Bawra	R. D. Burman, Annette Pinto
Ek Daku Shehar Mein	2232	"Bhoolbhuliya Shehar Ki Galiyaan"	Rajesh Roshan	Rajesh Roshan, Majrooh Sultanpuri, Chander Oberoi	solo
Ek Daku Shehar Mein	2233	"Humnasheen Aake Bahut Door"	Rajesh Roshan	Rajesh Roshan, Majrooh Sultanpuri, Chander Oberoi	Alka Yagnik
Ek Se Bhale Do	2234	"Band Toh Bajega"	R D Burman	Anjaan	Anuradha Paudwal, Shailendra Singh
Ek Se Bhale Do	2235	"Laapa Changa Mein Nache"	R D Burman	Anjaan	Asha Bhosle, Lata Mangeshkar, R D Burman
Ek Se Bhale Do	2236	"Aaja Re Meri Zamborin"	R D Burman	Anjaan	Asha Bhosle
Faasle	2237	"Chandni Tu Hai Kahan"	Shiv-Hari	Shahryar	Lata Mangeshkar
Faasle	2238	"Janam Janam"	Shiv-Hari	Shahryar	Lata Mangeshkar
Faasle	2239	"Hum Chup Hain"	Shiv-Hari	Shahryar	Lata Mangeshkar
Faasle	2240	"In Aankhon Ke Zeenon Se"	Shiv-Hari	Shahryar	Lata Mangeshkar
Geraftaar	2241	"Yaaron Pe Kurbaan"	Bappi Lahiri	Indeevar	Mohammad Aziz
Geraftaar	2242	"Dhoop Mein Nikla Na Karo"	Bappi Lahiri	Indeevar	Asha Bhosle
Ghar Dwaar	2243	"Titliyon Se Yeh Keh Do"	Chitrgupt	Anjaan	solo
Haqeeqat	2244	"Tune Pilaya Hai Kya"	Bappi Lahiri	Indeevar	solo
Hoshiyar	2245	"Teri Jaisi Koi Shreemati Chahiye"	Bappi Lahiri	Indeevar	Asha Bhosle
Hoshiyar	2246	"Atka Atka Dil Mera"	Bappi Lahiri	Indeevar	Asha Bhosle
Hoshiyar	2247	"Choli Tere Tan Pe"	Bappi Lahiri	Indeevar	Asha Bhosle
Hum Dono	2248	"Sunle Zameen Aasman"	R D Burman	Anand Bakshi	
Hum Dono	2249	"Tu Lajawaab Bemisal"	R D Burman	Anand Bakshi	
Hum Dono	2250	"Josh-e-jawani Tauba"	R D Burman	Anand Bakshi	solo
Hum Naujawan	2251	"You Are My Darling"	R D Burman	Anjaan	Penaaz Masani
Hum Paagal Premee	2252	"Pyaar Dil Ko Hasaye"	Anu Malik	Hasrat Jaipuri	solo
Hum Paagal Premee	2253	"Jaane Jaan Yeh Hawaein"	Anu Malik	Hasrat Jaipuri	Asha Bhosle
Insaaf Main Karoonga	2254	"Aap Ki Nazron Se"	Bappi Lahiri	Anjaan	Asha Bhosle
Insaaf Main Karoonga	2255	"Socha Kahan Tha (Sad)"	Bappi Lahiri	Anjaan	solo
Jaan Ki Baazi	2256	"Bambai Ne Paida Kiya"	Anu Malik	Anjaan	solo
Jab Pyar Hua	2257	"Is Duniya Mein The"	R. D. Burman	Anand Bakshi	Asha Bhosle
Jhoothi	2258	"Chanda Dekhe Chanda"	Bappi Lahiri	Maya Govind	Lata Mangeshkar
Lallu Ram	2259	"Sachchi Keh Rayo Lallu Ram"	Ravindra Jain	Ravindra Jain	solo
Lava	2260	"Dil Kya Hai Ek Sheesha"	R D Burman	Anand Bakshi	Asha Bhosle, Shailendra Singh
Lava	2261	"Hum Tum Dono Milke"	R D Burman	Anand Bakshi	Lata Mangeshkar
Lava	2262	"Kuch Log Mohabbat Karke"	R D Burman	Anand Bakshi	solo
Lover Boy	2263	"Main Tera Pyaar Hoon"	Bappi Lahiri	Anjaan	Asha Bhosle
Lover Boy	2264	"Bahon Mein Leke Mujhe"	Bappi Lahiri	Anjaan	Asha Bhosle
Lover Boy	2265	"Bahon Mein Leke Mujhe (Sad)"	Bappi Lahiri	Anjaan	Asha Bhosle
Lover Boy	2266	"Kiss Me"	Bappi Lahiri	Anjaan	Leena Chandavarkar
Mahaguru	2267	"Chikni Chikni Kawal Jaisi"	Bappi Lahiri	Indeevar	Asha Bhosle
Masterji	2268	"Bulbul Mere Bata"	Bappi Lahiri	Indeevar	Asha Bhosle
Masterji	2269	"Aankhen Toh Kholo Swami"	Bappi Lahiri	Indeevar	Asha Bhosle
Masterji	2270	"Jab Tanhai Mein Do Dil"	Bappi Lahiri	Indeevar	Asha Bhosle
Masterji	2271	"Gaalon Par Yeh Kaise Nishaan"	Bappi Lahiri	Indeevar	S Janaki
Meetha Zehar	2272	"Kabhi Hoti Nahin Hai Jiski Haar"	Babla	Indeevar	solo
Mera Saathi	2273	"Aai Aai Rehne Ko tere Dil Mein"	Bappi Lahiri	Indeevar	Lata Mangeshkar
Mera Saathi	2274	"Daddy Se Tujhko Milaoongi"	Bappi Lahiri	Indeevar	Asha Bhosle
Mera Saathi	2275	"Sapnon Mein Kho Jaa"	Bappi Lahiri	Indeevar	Asha Bhosle
Mohabbat	2276	"Zindagi Mein Pehla Pehla"	Bappi Lahiri	Indeevar	Asha Bhosle
Mohabbat	2277	"Apni Laila Ka Jo Pyaar"	Bappi Lahiri	Indeevar	Amit Kumar
Mohabbat	2278	"Mehbooba Payi Hai Maine"	Bappi Lahiri	Indeevar	solo
Mohabbat	2279	"Sanson Se Nahi"	Bappi Lahiri	Indeevar	solo
Meri Jung	2280	"Bol Baby Bol"	Laxmikant-Pyarelal	Anand Bakshi	S. Janaki
Naya Bakra	2281	"Aap Se Dil Mila"	K. Babuji	Anjaan	Asha Bhosle
Oonche Log	2282	"Aaj Tu Gair Sahi"	R D Burman	Tasleem Fazli	solo
Oonche Log	2283	"Tera Ghar Teri Galiyan"	R D Burman	Anjaan	solo
Oonche Log	2284	"Dil Kya Chahe Kaise Boloon"	R D Burman	Anjaan	solo
Oonche Log	2285	"Tu Mera Kya Lage"	R D Burman	Anjaan	Salma Agha
Paisa Yeh Paisa	2286	"Jor Se Bajaao Zara Band Baaja"	Usha Khanna	M G Hashmat	Anuradha Paudwal, Mohammad Aziz
Paisa Yeh Paisa	2287	"Jis Dil Mein Pyaar Na Ho"	Usha Khanna	Verma Malik	solo
Pataal Bhairavi	2288	"Mehmaan Nazar Ki Ban Ja"	Bappi Lahiri	Indeevar	Lata Mangeshkar
Pataal Bhairavi	2289	"Jhoom Jhoom Ke"	Bappi Lahiri	Indeevar	Asha Bhosle
Pataal Bhairavi	2290	"Jhanak Jhanak Lehar Naache"	Bappi Lahiri	Indeevar	Asha Bhosle
Pighalta Aasman	2291	"Teri Meri Prem Kahani"	Kalyanji-Anandji	Maya Govind	Alka Yagnik
Pyari Behna	2292	"Bahon Mein Jab Tak"	Bappi Lahiri	Anjaan	solo
Pyari Behna	2293	"Shadi Ka Matlab"	Bappi Lahiri	Indeevar	Asha Bhosle
Pyari Behna	2294	"Jal Gaye Jal Gaye"	Bappi Lahiri	Indeevar	Asha Bhosle
Rahi Badal Gaye	2295	"Ek Baat Dil Mein Aayi Hai"	R D Burman	Gulshan Bawra	Lata Mangeshkar
Rahi Badal Gaye	2296	"Meri Dua Hai"	R D Burman	Gulshan Bawra	solo
Rahi Badal Gaye	2297	"Hillori Hillori"	R D Burman	Gulshan Bawra	solo
Ram Tere Kitne Nam	2298	"O Meri Jaan" (happy)	R D Burman	Gulshan Bawra	solo
Ram Tere Kitne Nam	2299	"O Meri Jaan" (sad)	R D Burman	Gulshan Bawra	solo
Ram Tere Kitne Nam	2300	"Zoobi Zoobi Mehboobi"	R D Burman	Majrooh Sultanpuri	solo
Rusvai	2301	"Meri Tanhai Ko"	R D Burman	Indeevar	Arati Mukherjee
Saagar	2302	"Yunhi Gaate Raho"	R D Burman	Javed Akhtar	S P Balasubrahmanyam
Saagar	2303	"Saagar Kinnaare"	R D Burman	Javed Akhtar	Lata Mangeshkar
Saagar	2304	"Saagar Jaisi Aankhon Wali"	R D Burman	Javed Akhtar	solo
Saaheb	2305	"Kya Khabar Kya Pata"	Bappi Lahiri	Anjaan	solo
Saaheb	2306	"Chalte Chalen Lehron Ke Saath"	Bappi Lahiri	Anjaan	solo
Sanjog	2307	"Dil Kya Chahe"	Laxmikant-Pyarelal	Anjaan	Asha Bhosle
Sarfarosh	2308	"Sridevi Sridevi"	Laxmikant-Pyarelal	Anand Bakshi	solo
Sarfarosh	2309	"Chor Chor Chor"	Laxmikant-Pyarelal	Anand Bakshi	Asha Bhosle
Sautela Pati	2310	"Hum Tumse Mile Jabse"	Iqbal Qureshi	Nida Fazli	Asha Bhosle
Shiva Ka Insaaf	2311	"Kal Ke Shiva Tum Ho"	R D Burman	Gulshan Bawra	solo
Sitamgar	2312	"Pyaar Jab Na Diya"	R D Burman	Majrooh Sultanpuri	solo
Sitamgar	2313	"Chand Roz Aur Meri Jaan"	R D Burman	Majrooh Sultanpuri	solo
Sitamgar	2314	"Hum Kitne Nadaan The"	R D Burman	Majrooh Sultanpuri	solo
Sitamgar	2315	"Tum Dilwalon Ke Aage"	R D Burman	Majrooh Sultanpuri	Lata Mangeshkar
Sitamgar	2316	"Mausam Pyaar Ka"	R D Burman	Majrooh Sultanpuri	Asha Bhosle
Sitamgar	2317	"Meri Tarah Allah Kare"	R D Burman	Majrooh Sultanpuri	Asha Bhosle
Surkhiyan	2318	"Teri Hothon Ka Amrit"	Vanraj Bhatia	Indeevar	
Surkhiyan	2319	"Dil Zinda Rakhne Ke Liye"	Vanraj Bhatia	Indeevar	
Surkhiyan	2320	"Woh Ek Dost Jo"	Vanraj Bhatia	Indeevar	
Telephone	2321	"Main Tujhse Pyaar Karoon"	Rajesh Roshan	Rajesh Roshan	solo
Ulta Seedha	2322	"Dakan Ki Ek Haseena"	Rajesh Roshan	Majrooh Sultanpuri	solo
Ulta Seedha	2323	"Ulta Seedha"	Rajesh Roshan	Majrooh Sultanpuri	solo
Ulta Seedha	2324	"Uncle Robert Kya Bole Tumko"	Rajesh Roshan	Majrooh Sultanpuri	Asha Bhosle, Bonny Remedious
Ulta Seedha	2325	"Yaar Ki Gali"	Rajesh Roshan	Majrooh Sultanpuri	Lata Mangeshkar
Wafadaar	2326	"Deem Tara Deem"	Bappi Lahiri	Indeevar	Asha Bhosle
Wafadaar	2327	"Ek Chandan Ki Khushboo"	Bappi Lahiri	Indeevar	Asha Bhosle
Yudh	2328	"Zindagi Ae Zindagi"	Kalyanji-Anandji	Anand Bakshi	solo
Zabardast	2329	"Jab Chaha Yaara Tumne"	R D Burman	Majrooh Sultanpuri	solo
Zabardast	2330	"Dekho Idhar Janabe Maan"	R D Burman	Majrooh Sultanpuri	solo
Zabardast	2331	"Bhool Ho Gayi"	R D Burman	Majrooh Sultanpuri	Asha Bhosle
Zabardast	2332	"Karega Zamana Kya"	R D Burman	Majrooh Sultanpuri	Asha Bhosle
Zamana	2333	"Ik Baat Hai Tumse"	Usha Khanna	Majrooh Sultanpuri	Asha Bhosle
Zamana	2334	"Ganyat Saankli Sonachi"	Usha Khanna	Majrooh Sultanpuri	Asha Bhosle, Shailendra Singh
Zamana	2335	"Pyare Nanadoiya"	Usha Khanna	Majrooh Sultanpuri	Syed Amir Ahamed
Zamana	2336	"Nach Na Jane"	Usha Khanna	Majrooh Sultanpuri	Hariharan
Zamana	2337	"Rang Chala Bahaar Chali"	Usha Khanna	Majrooh Sultanpuri	solo
Zamana	2338	"Kisko Kahe Hum Apna"	Usha Khanna	Majrooh Sultanpuri	Mohammad Aziz

==== 1986 ====
Film	No.	Song	Composer(s)	Writer(s)	Co-artist(s)
Adhikar	2339	"Main Dil Tu Dhadkan" (male)	Bappi Lahiri	Indeevar	solo
Adhikar	2340	"Shuru Hui Pyaar Ki Kahani"	Bappi Lahiri	Indeevar	Kavita Krishnamurthy
Amrit	2341	"Zindagi Kya Hai Ek Lateefa"	Laxmikant-Pyarelal	Anand Bakshi	solo
Angaaray	2342	"Pyaar Kehte Hain Jise"	Anu Malik	Rajendra Krishan	solo
Anjaam Khuda Jaane	2343	"Yeh Duniya Unke Liye Hai"	Manoj-Gyan	Shakir Kotwi	Mohammad Aziz
Avinash	2344	"Jaaga Soya Pyaar" (version 1)	Bappi Lahiri	Amit Khanna	Anupama Deshpande
Avinash	2345	"Jaaga Soya Pyaar" (version 2)	Bappi Lahiri	Amit Khanna	Anupama Deshpande
Baat Ban Jaye	2346	"Mere Dil Mein Hai Dilbar"	Kalyanji-Anandji	Anand Bakshi	Alka Yagnik
Baat Ban Jaye	2347	"Main Punjabi Hindustani"	Kalyanji-Anandji	Anand Bakshi	solo
Begaana	2348	"Jigar Thaam Lo"	Anu Malik	Anjaan	solo
Begaana	2349	"Apnon Mein Main Begaana"	Anu Malik	Anjaan	solo
Begaana	2350	"Apnon Mein Main Begaana (Version 2)"	Anu Malik	Anjaan	solo
Begaana	2351	"Dear Sir Aapko"	Anu Malik	Anjaan	Asha Bhosle
Bhagwan Dada	2352	"Tujhse Pehle Bematlab Thi"	Rajesh Roshan	Indeevar	solo
Bhagwan Dada	2353	"Tujhse Pehle Bematlab Thi" (sad)	Rajesh Roshan	Indeevar	solo
Bhagwan Dada	2354	"Super Fast Love"	Rajesh Roshan	Farooq Qaisar	Anuradha Paudwal
Car Thief	2355	"Jaane Mera Dil"	Anu Malik	Anjaan	Asha Bhosle
Car Thief	2356	"Koi Jhanak Raha Hai"	Anu Malik	Anjaan	solo
Car Thief	2357	"Tera Mera Saath Hain"	Anu Malik	Anjaan	Vijeta Pandit
Car Thief	2358	"Tera Mera Saath Hain" (sad)	Anu Malik	Anjaan	solo
Chameli Ki Shaadi	2359	"Peena Haraam Hai"	Kalyanji-Anandji	Prakash Mehra	Alka Yagnik
Chhota Sa Aadmi	2360	"Main To Hoon Chhota Sa Aadmi"	Mahesh-Naresh	Jainendra Jain	Kavita Krishnamurthy
Chhota Sa Aadmi	2361	"Chhota Sa Aadmi Hoon"	Mahesh-Naresh	Jainendra Jain	solo
Chhota Sa Aadmi	2362	"Chhota Sa Aadmi Hoon" (sad)	Mahesh-Naresh	Jainendra Jain	solo
Dharm Adhikari	1363	"Aankhen Do"	Bappi Lahiri	Indeevar	S. Janaki
Dharm Adhikari	2364	"Mamla Gadbad Hai"	Bappi Lahiri	Indeevar	S. Janaki
Dilwaala	2365	"Duniya Dushman Bane To"	Bappi Lahiri	Indeevar	solo
Dilwaala	2366	"Saath Saath Rehna Meri"	Bappi Lahiri	Indeevar	S Janaki
Dilwaala	2367	"Pakdo Pakdo Chor Ko"	Bappi Lahiri	Indeevar	Asha Bhosle
Duty	2368	"Tum Jise Chaho Apna Banana"	Babla	Ramesh Pant	Kanchan
Duty	2369	"Jis Mehfil Mein Aata Hoon"	Babla	Ramesh Pant	solo
Ehsaan Aap Ka	2370	"Yeh Baat Hai Naseeb Ki"	Ravindra Jain	Yogesh	solo
Ek Aur Sikander	2371	"Aye Ma Khuda To Nahin Tu"	Rajesh Roshan	Majrooh Sultanpuri	Alka Yagnik, Manna Dey
Ek Aur Sikander	2372	"Dhadka Dil Dil"	Rajesh Roshan	Majrooh Sultanpuri	Alka Yagnik
Ek Aur Sikander	2373	"Aaja Sathiya Manayen"	Rajesh Roshan	Majrooh Sultanpuri	Lata Mangeshkar
Ek Main Aur Ek Tu	2374	"Daddy Bolo Sunny"	R D Burman	Anand Bakshi	solo
Ghar Sansar	2375	"Jeevan Ki Raste Mein"	Rajesh Roshan	Indeevar	Alka Yagnik, Mohammad Aziz
Ghar Sansar	2376	"Chot Lagi Kahan"	Rajesh Roshan	Indeevar	Asha Bhosle
Insaaf Ki Awaaz	2377	"Radha Pyaar De"	Bappi Lahiri	Indeevar	S. Janaki
Insaaf Ki Awaaz	2378	"Insaaf Ki Awaaz"	Bappi Lahiri	Indeevar	solo
Insaaf Ki Awaaz	2379	"Insaaf Ki Awaaz" (sad)	Bappi Lahiri	Indeevar	solo
Jaal	2380	"Apdi Ki Topdi"	Anu Malik	Anand Bakshi	solo
Janbaaz	2381	"Tera Saath Hai Kitna Pyaara"	Kalyanji-Anandji	Indeevar	Sapna Mukherjee
Kaanch Ki Deewar	2382	"Aiyo Na Maaro"	Kalyanji-Anandji	Kafeel Azar	Sharadrima
Karma	2383	"De Daaru"	Laxmikant-Pyarelal	Anand Bakshi	Mahendra Kapoor, Manhar Udhas
Karma	2384	"Na Jaiyo Pardes"	Laxmikant-Pyarelal	Anand Bakshi	Kavita Krishnamurthy
Kasme Rasme	2385	"Zindagi Ka Yeh Ehsaan Hai"	Bappi Lahiri	Indeevar	Shailendra Singh
Khamosh Nigahen	2386	"Maine Tumse Muskurake Baat Ki"	Ravi	Ravi	Asha Bhosle
Khamosh Nigahen	2387	"Chalo Aaj Chalen"	Ravi	Ravi	solo
Locket	2388	"Suno Satpalji"	Bappi Lahiri	Gauhar Kanpuri	Shailendra Singh
Locket	2389	"Bhole Shankar"	Bappi Lahiri	Gauhar Kanpuri	Lata Mangeshkar, Bappi Lahiri
Maa Ki Saugandh	2390	"Aai Maa Mujhko Saugandh Teri"	Rajesh Roshan	Anjaan	solo
Main Balwan	2391	"No Entry"	Bappi Lahiri	Anjaan	Nazia Hasan
Main Balwan	2392	"Rock-N-Roll"	Bappi Lahiri	Anjaan	Nazia Hasan
Maqaar	2393	"Tu Hi Mera Sapna"	Rajesh Roshan	Rajesh Roshan, Amit Khanna	solo
Mera Dharam	2394	"Jaanam Jaanam"	Bappi Lahiri	Hasan Kamal	Asha Bhosle
Mera Haque	2395	"Kala Kauwa Dekhta Hai"	Anu Malik	Indeevar	Alka Yagnik
Muddat	2396	"Love Express"	Bappi Lahiri	Indeevar	Asha Bhosle, Ameen Sayani
Muddat	2397	"Mujhe Kehte Hai Romeo"	Bappi Lahiri	Indeevar	solo
Muddat	2398	"Pedon Ko Gaali Dene Do"	Bappi Lahiri	Indeevar	Asha Bhosle
Musafir	2399	"Bahot Raat Huyi"	R. D. Burman	Gulzar	solo
Nasihat	2400	"Zindagi Hai Kitne Din Ki"	Kalyanji-Anandji	Anjaan	Asha Bhosle
Nasihat	2401	"Tum Bahot Haseen Sahi"	Kalyanji-Anandji	Anjaan	Alka Yagnik
Nasihat	2402	"Tere Mere Pyaar Ki Kundli"	Kalyanji-Anandji	Anjaan	Hemlata
Nasihat	2403	"Jhunak Jhunak Jhanjhar Baaje"	Kalyanji-Anandji	Anjaan	Mahendra Kapoor, Alka Yagnik
Palay Khan	2404	"Allah Ka Naam Le"	R D Burman	Anand Bakshi	Suresh Wadkar
Patton Ki Bazi	2405	"Nahin Door Manzil"	Anoop Jalota	Maya Govind	solo
Peechha Karro	2406	"Mujhpe Goli Na Chala"	Anand-Milind	Sameer	solo
Peechha Karro	2407	"Chham Se Aaya"	Anand-Milind	Sameer	Asha Bhosle
Peechha Karro	2408	"Jaane Kya Hua Rama"	Anand-Milind	Sameer	Asha Bhosle
Preeti	2409	"Preeti J'Taime"	Usha Khanna	Saawan Kumar Tak	Lata Mangeshkar
Preeti	2410	"Hum Dilko Bechte Hai"	Usha Khanna	Saawan Kumar Tak	Lata Mangeshkar
Preeti	2411	"Kuchh Log Anjaane Bhi"	Usha Khanna	Saawan Kumar Tak	
Qatil Aur Ashiq	2412	"Moti Moti Rotiya Pakaana"	Nadeem-Shravan	Anjaan	Anuradha Paudwal
Qatl	2413	"Kahan Jaa Raha Tha"	Laxmikant-Pyarelal	Rajendra Krishan	solo
Samay Ki Dhaara	2414	"Ghar Se Beghar Kar Gayi"	Jugal Kishore-Tilak Raj	M. G. Hashmat	
Samay Ki Dhaara	2415	"Tik Dim Tum Tum"	Jugal Kishore-Tilak Raj	M. G. Hashmat	Jayshree Shivram, Baby Rajeshwari
Samundar	2416	"Yeh Kori Karari Kanwari"	R D Burman	Anand Bakshi	solo
Samundar	2417	"Ae Saagar Ki Lehron"	R D Burman	Anand Bakshi	Lata Mangeshkar
Samundar	2418	"Us Din Mujhko Bhool Na Jaana"	R D Burman	Anand Bakshi	Lata Mangeshkar
Saveray Wali Gaadi	2419	"Saanjh Pade Gaaye Deewane"	R D Burman	Majrooh Sultanpuri	solo
Saveray Wali Gaadi	2420	"Jab Do Pyaar Milte Hain"	R D Burman	Majrooh Sultanpuri	solo
Shatru	2421	"Iski Topi Uske Sar"	R D Burman	Anand Bakshi	solo
Sheesha	2422	"Pyaar Hai Bas Yahi"	Bappi Lahiri	Yogesh	solo
Sheesha	2423	"Pyaar Hai Kya Yahi"	Bappi Lahiri	Yogesh	solo
Singhasan	2424	"Waah Waah Kya Rang Hai"	Bappi Lahiri	Indeevar	Asha Bhosle
Singhasan	2425	"Kismat Likhnewale Par"	Bappi Lahiri	Indeevar	Asha Bhosle
Singhasan	2426	"Takatu Taka Tai"	Bappi Lahiri	Indeevar	P Susheela
Singhasan	2427	"Tere Liye Maine Janam Liya"	Bappi Lahiri	Indeevar	P Susheela
Suhaagan	2428	"Tu Ladka Garam Masala"	Bappi Lahiri	Indeevar	S Janaki
Suhaagan	2429	"Aankhon Se Girana Na"	Bappi Lahiri	Indeevar	Asha Bhosle, Chandrani Mukherjee
Suhaagan	2430	"Chham Chham Chhai Chhai"	Bappi Lahiri	Indeevar	Asha Bhosle
Suhaagan	2431	"Ghungta Kholna" (version 1)	Bappi Lahiri	Indeevar	Asha Bhosle
Suhaagan	2432	"Ghungta Kholna" (version 2)	Bappi Lahiri	Indeevar	Asha Bhosle
Swarag Se Sunder	2433	"Apna Ghar Hai Swarag Se sundar"	Laxmikant-Pyarelal	Anand Bakshi	Asha Bhosle
Swarag Se Sunder	2434	"Woh To Maine Jhooth Bola Tha"	Laxmikant-Pyarelal	Anand Bakshi	Asha Bhosle
Swarag Se Sunder	2435	"Pyaar Karne Ka Mausam Aaya"	Laxmikant-Pyarelal	Anand Bakshi	Asha Bhosle
Swarag Se Sunder	2436	"Devi Mata Rani"	Laxmikant-Pyarelal	Anand Bakshi	Lata Mangeshkar
Zindagani	2437	"Pyaar Ka Hoon Main Deewana"	R D Burman	Indeevar	Annette Pinto

==== 1987 ====
Film	No.	Song	Composer(s)	Writer(s)	Co-artist(s)
Aulad	2438	"To Phir Ho Jaaye"	Laxmikant-Pyarelal	S. H. Bihari	Kavita Krishnamurthy
Dacait	2439	"Gaon Mein Mach Gaya Shor"	R D Burman	Anand Bakshi	Asha Bhosle, Suresh Wadkar
Dil Tujhko Diya	2440	"Zindagi Chand Dino Ka Hai"	Rajesh Roshan	Rajesh Roshan	Asha Bhosle
Dil Tujhko Diya	2441	"Jaaneman Main Koi Teacher Nahin"	Rajesh Roshan	Rajesh Roshan	solo
Diljalaa	2442	"Mere Munna Mere Chanda (Male)"	Bappi Lahiri	Indeevar	solo
Diljalaa	2443	"Jaan Tan Se"	Bappi Lahiri	Indeevar	solo
Diljalaa	2444	"Pyaar Ki Jab Koi Baat Chali"	Bappi Lahiri	Indeevar	Asha Bhosle
Ek Ladki Badnaam Si	2445	"Zindagi Hai Hnas Hans Ke Jeena"	Bappi Lahiri	Kulwant Jani	Asha Bhosle
Ek Ladki Badnaam Si	2446	"Rahe Na Rahe"	Bappi Lahiri	Kulwant Jani	Lata Mangeshkar
Hawalaat	2447	"Step By Step"	Anu Malik	Gulshan Bawra	Asha Bhosle
Himmat Aur Mehanat	2448	"Touch Me"	Bappi Lahiri	Indeevar	Asha Bhosle
Himmat Aur Mehanat	2449	"Mumbai Roke To Roke"	Bappi Lahiri	Indeevar	Asha Bhosle
Hiraasat	2450	"Baaton Se Baat Na Banegi"	Kalyanji-Anandji	Anjaan	Asha Bhosle
Hiraasat	2451	"Har Aadmi Ko Biwi Ka Ghulam"	Kalyanji-Anandji	Vishweshwar Sharma	Alka Yagnik
Hiraasat	2452	"Aage Aage Woh Chale"	Kalyanji-Anandji	Vishweshwar Sharma	solo
Imaandaar	2453	"Bada Shaitan Hai Dil"	Kalyanji-Anandji	Prakash Mehra	solo
Inaam Dus Hazaar	2454	"Jaane Bhi Do Yaar"	R D Burman	Majrooh Sultanpuri	solo
Inaam Dus Hazaar	2455	"Chand Koi Hoga Tumsa Kahan"	R D Burman	Majrooh Sultanpuri	Asha Bhosle
Insaf Ki Pukar	2456	"Aa Aa Mere Dil Jaani"	Laxmikant-Pyarelal	Anand Bakshi	Kavita Krishnamurthy
Insaf Ki Pukar	2457	"Pyaar Ka Shola Bhadka"	Laxmikant-Pyarelal	Anand Bakshi	Kavita Krishnamurthy
Insaf Ki Pukar	2458	"Achchha Bura Jaane Khuda"	Laxmikant-Pyarelal	Anand Bakshi	Mohammad Aziz
Jaan Hatheli Pe	2459	"Chhuo Na Chhune Do"	Laxmikant-Pyarelal	Anjaan	Asha Bhosle
Kaash	2460	"Phool Ye Kahan Se"	Rajesh Roshan	Farooq Kaiser	Sadhana Sargam
Kaash	2461	"O Yaara"	Rajesh Roshan	Farooq Kaiser	Anupama Deshpande
Kaash	2462	"Baad Muddat Ke"	Rajesh Roshan	Farooq Kaiser	solo
Kaun Jeeta Kaun Haara	2463	"Jeevan Pyaar Bina Kuchh Nahi" (version 1)	Usha Khanna	Kulwant Jani	solo
Madadgaar	2464	"Ek Do Teen Chaar"	Laxmikant-Pyarelal	Anand Bakshi	Asha Bhosle
Majaal	2465	"Ting Ying Ghanti Baaje"	Bappi Lahiri	Indeevar	Asha Bhosle
Majaal	2466	"Sharabon Se Kya Mujhko Kaam"	Bappi Lahiri	Indeevar	Asha Bhosle
Majaal	2467	"Haye Rama Haye Rama"	Bappi Lahiri	Indeevar	Asha Bhosle
Majaal	2468	"Tum Into Main"	Bappi Lahiri	Indeevar	Asha Bhosle
Mard Ki Zabaan	2469	"Lo Aa gaya Hero"	Laxmikant-Pyarelal	S. H. Bihari	S Janaki
Mard Ki Zabaan	2470	"Humne Jo Bhi Tumko Diye"	Laxmikant-Pyarelal	Indeevar	Alka Yagnik
Marte Dam Tak	2471	"Naam Se Kya Lena"	Ravindra Jain	Ravindra Jain	solo
Mera Yaar Mera Dushman	2472	"Beoda Pahije Mala"	Bappi Lahiri	Gulshan Bawra	solo
Mera Yaar Mera Dushman	2473	"Karwat Badal Badal Ke"	Bappi Lahiri	Gulshan Bawra	solo
Mera Yaar Mera Dushman	2474	"Kabhi Khulke Mile"	Bappi Lahiri	Gulshan Bawra	Asha Bhosle
Mera Suhaag	2475	"Bahaaron Ka Yeh Mausam"	Ravi	Ravi	solo
Mera Suhaag	2476	"Mera Dil Tera"	Ravi	Ravi	Asha Bhosle
Mohre	2477	"Ek Lamha To Bina Dard Ke"	Vanraj Bhatia	Shakti Kumar	solo
Mr. India	2478	"Zindagi Ki Yahi Reet Hai"	Laxmikant-Pyarelal	Javed Akhtar	solo
Mr. India	2479	"Zindagi Ki Yahi Reet Hai" (sad)	Laxmikant-Pyarelal	Javed Akhtar	solo
Mr. India	2480	"Karte Hain Pyaar Hum Mr. India Se"	Laxmikant-Pyarelal	Javed Akhtar	Kavita Krishnamurthy
Mr. India	2481	"Kaate Nahin Katate"	Laxmikant-Pyarelal	Javed Akhtar	Alisha Chinai
Muqaddar Ka Faisla	2482	"Aaj Humko Aadmi Ko Pehchaan"	Bappi Lahiri	Anjaan	Mohammad Aziz
Muqaddar Ka Faisla	2483	"Kanhaiya Ji Ne Janam Liyo Re"	Bappi Lahiri	Anjaan	Asha Bhosle
Muqaddar Ka Faisla	2484	"Jo Hum Kaam Karte Hai"	Bappi Lahiri	Prakash Mehra	solo
Muqaddar Ka Faisla	2485	"Na Kal Ka Pata"	Bappi Lahiri	Prakash Mehra	solo
Naam O Nishan	2486	"O Tera Naam Kya Hai"	Anu Malik	Indeevar	Alka Yagnik
Nazrana	2487	"Isse Pehle Ke Yaad Tu Aaye"	Laxmikant-Pyarelal	Anand Bakshi	solo
Parivaar	2488	"Baat Pate Ki Kahe Madari"	Laxmikant-Pyarelal	Anand Bakshi	Kavita Krishnamurthy
Pyaar Karke Dekho	2489	"Maine Tumhe Pyaar Kiya Hai"	Bappi Lahiri	Indeevar	solo
Pyar Ki Jeet	2490	"Mujhe Rehna Hai Tere Dil Mein"	Usha Khanna	Saawan Kumar Tak	solo
Pyar Ajnabi Hai	2491	"Pyar Ajnabi Hai"	Kishore Kumar		solo
Pyar Ajnabi Hai	2492	"Hamari Zid Hai Ke"	Kishore Kumar		solo
Pyar Ajnabi Hai	2493	"Tumse Saje Hain Mere Sapne"	Kishore Kumar		Asha Bhosle
Pyar Ke Kabil	2494	"Tere Jaisa Mukhda Toh" (male)	Bappi Lahiri	Indeevar	solo
Pyar Ke Kabil	2495	"Red Light No Green Light"	Bappi Lahiri	Indeevar	solo
Sabse Badi Adalat	2496	"Dheemi Dheemi Aag Lagi Hai"	Bappi Lahiri		solo
Sadak Chhap	2497	"Haan Main Sadak Chhap Hoon"	Bappi Lahiri	Anjaan	solo
Sadak Chhap	2498	"Haan Main Sadak Chhap Hoin" (sad)	Bappi Lahiri	Anjaan	solo
Sadak Chhap	2499	"Pehli Pehli Baar"	Bappi Lahiri	Anjaan	Padmini Kolhapure
Secret Agent	2500	"Mukh Pe Naqaab Daala Hai"	Bappi Lahiri	Farooq Kaiser	Asha Bhosle
Sindoor	2501	"Jhatpat Ghunghat Khol"	Laxmikant-Pyarelal	Anand Bakshi	Hariharan
Vishal	2502	"Seene Mein Dil Mera"	Usha Khanna	Nida Fazli	Asha Bhosle
Woh Din Aayega	2503	"Yeh Jo Hua Sach Kaho"	Aalok Ganguly	Majrooh Sultanpuri	Asha Bhosle

==== 1988 ====
Film	No.	Song	Composer(s)	Writer(s)	Co-artist(s)
Aage Ki Soch	2504	"O Mere Pyare Bail"	Raam Laxman	Bal Kishan Puri	solo
Aage Ki Soch	2505	"Heeron Se Motiyo Se"	Raam Laxman	Bal Kishan Puri	Usha Mangeshkar
Aage Ki Soch	2506	"Phudak Phudak Ke Na Chal"	Raam Laxman	Bal Kishan Puri	Usha Mangeshkar
Aage Ki Soch	2507	"Sapna O Sapna"	Raam Laxman	Bal Kishan Puri	Usha Mangeshkar
Akarshan	2508	"O Mere Yaar"	Bappi Lahiri	Anjaan	solo
Akhri Muqabla	2509	"Zindagi Kya Hai Kaanta Hai" (version 1)	Usha Khanna	Indeevar	solo
Akhri Muqabla	2510	"Zindagi Kya Hai Kaanta Hai" (version 2)	Usha Khanna	Indeevar	solo
Charnon Ki Saugandh	2511	"Chal Sair Gulshan Ki"	Laxmikant-Pyarelal	Anand Bakshi	Alka Yagnik
Charnon Ki Saugandh	2512	"Nariyan Shehar Ki Nariyan"	Laxmikant-Pyarelal	Anand Bakshi	Alka Yagnik
Charnon Ki Saugandh	2513	"Ek Raavan Ko Ram Ne Maara"	Laxmikant-Pyarelal	Anand Bakshi	solo
Commando	2514	"O Dada O Dada"	Bappi Lahiri	Anjaan	Asha Bhosle
Dharam Shatru	2515	"Pehle Mel Milap Bahut Tha"	Hemant Bhosle	Anjaan	solo
Faisla	2516	"Dulha Raja Mera"	R D Burman	Majrooh Sultanpuri	Asha Bhosle
Gangaa Jamunaa Saraswathi	2517	"Ek Ek Ho Jaye"	Anu Malik	Indeevar	Manhar Udhas
Ghar Mein Ram Gali Mein Shyam	2518	"Ghar Mein Ram Gali Mein Shyam"	Amar-Utpal	Anjaan	solo
Hatya	2519	"Aapko Agar Zarurat Hai"	Bappi Lahiri	Indeevar	Asha Bhosle
Hum Farishte Nahin	2520	"Sun Sun Sun Meri Shridevi"	Manoj-Gyan	Manoj Bhatnagar	solo
Jaan-E-Jaana	2521	"Hum Garibon Ka Bhi Guzara Ho Jaaye"	R. D. Burman	Indeevar	solo
Jaan-E-Jaana	2522	"Pyaar Se Jo Ek Baar Dejkh Le"	R. D. Burman	Indeevar	solo
Kabzaa	2523	"Tumse Mile Bina Chain Nahin"	Rajesh Roshan	Anand Bakshi	Anupama Deshpande
Khatron Ke Khiladi	2524	"Hum Dono Mein"	Laxmikant-Pyarelal	Anand Bakshi	Alka Yagnik
Lathi	2525	"Zindagi Ban Jaati Hai" (version 1)	R. D. Burman	Anand Bakshi	solo
Lathi	2526	"Zindagi Ban Jaati Hai" (version 2)	R. D. Burman	Anand Bakshi	solo
Maalamaal	2527	"Maal Hai To Taal Hai"	Anu Malik	Indeevar	Amit Kumar, Anu Malik
Maalamaal	2528	"Maal Ko Dekhe"	Anu Malik	Indeevar	Sudesh Bhosle
Mar Mitenge	2529	"Dekho Mera Janaza Nikla"	Laxmikant-Pyarelal	Anand Bakshi	Anuradha Paudwal
Mohabbat Ke Dushman	2530	"Allah Kare Maula Kare"	Kalyanji-Anandji	Prakash Mehra	solo
Namumkin	2531	"Aye Zindagi Kya Hai Tere Khel"	R D Burman	Anjaan	solo
Namumkin	2532	"Aye Zindagi Hui Kahaan Bhool"	R D Burman	Anjaan	solo
Namumkin	2533	"Bahut Door Hoke"	R D Burman	Anjaan	solo
Paap Ki Duniya	2534	"Chori Chori Yun"	Bappi Lahiri	Anjaan	solo
Paap Ki Duniya	2535	"Main Tera Tota"	Bappi Lahiri	Anjaan	S Janaki
Paap Ko Jalaa Kar Raakh Kar Doonga	2536	"Jeevan Sukh Dukh Ka Ek Sangam Hai"	Ravindra Jain	Ravindra Jain	Anuradha Paudwal
Paap Ko Jalaa Kar Raakh Kar Doonga	2537	"Hum Jise Ab Tak Bhool Na Paaye"	Ravindra Jain	Ravindra Jain	Anuradha Paudwal
Paap Ko Jalaa Kar Raakh Kar Doonga	2538	"Jeevan Sukh Dukh Ka Ek Sangam Hai" (Sad)	Ravindra Jain	Ravindra Jain	solo
Paap Ko Jalaa Kar Raakh Kar Doonga	2539	"Aag Jo Tere Tan Ko"	Ravindra Jain	Ravindra Jain	solo
Paap Ko Jalaa Kar Raakh Kar Doonga	2540	"Waqt Bigade Waqt Banaye"	Ravindra Jain	Ravindra Jain	solo
Pyaar Mohabbat	2541	"Goli Andar Dum Bahar"	Laxmikant-Pyarelal	Anand Bakshi	Laxmikant, Mehmood
Pyar Ka Mandir	2542	"Pyar Ke Pehle Kadam Par"	Laxmikant-Pyarelal	Anand Bakshi	Alka Yagnik
Pyar Ka Mandir	2543	"Aye Duniya Tujhko Salaam"	Laxmikant-Pyarelal	Anand Bakshi	solo
Pyar Ka Mandir	2544	"Jhopad Patti Zindabad"	Laxmikant-Pyarelal	Anand Bakshi	solo
Pyar Ki Manzil	2545	"Tere Jaisa Koi"	Usha Khanna	Indeevar	solo
Rukhsat	2546	"Naam-e-Ali Bolo"	Kalyanji-Anandji	Anjaan	solo
Rukhsat	2547	"Deewana Hoon Main Tera" (male)	Kalyanji-Anandji	Anjaan	solo
Rukhsat	2548	"Deewana Hoon Main Tera" (duet)	Kalyanji-Anandji	Anjaan	Sadhana Sargam
Saahil	2549	"Haseeno Se Khat Likh Ke"	Vipin-Kishore	N/A	
Saahil	2550	"Samay Ka Panchi Udta Jaaye"	Vipin-Kishore	N/A	
Saazish	2551	"Yeh Shehar"	Kalyanji-Anandji	Anand Bakshi	Asha Bhosle
Shahenshah	2552	"Andheri Raaton Mein"	Amar-Utpal	Anand Bakshi	solo
Shahenshah	2553	"Hoga Thanedar Tu"	Amar-Utpal	Anand Bakshi	Lata Mangeshkar
Shiva Shakti	2554	"Teri Tarah To Mahfil Mein"	Anand-Milind	Shaily Shailendra	Alka Yagnik
Sone Pe Suhaaga	2555	"Chori Chori Chhupe Chhupe" (part 1)	Bappi Lahiri	Indeevar	Lata Mangeshkar
Sone Pe Suhaaga	2556	"Chori Chori Chhupe Chhupe" (part 2)	Bappi Lahiri	Indeevar	Lata Mangeshkar
Sone Pe Suhaaga	2557	"Seene Se Lagaa Loon Tujhe"	Bappi Lahiri	Indeevar	Asha Bhosle
Sone Pe Suhaaga	2558	"Dil Aafridam"	Bappi Lahiri	Indeevar	Asha Bhosle
Waaris	2559	"Husn Ki Vaadiyon Mein"	Uttam-Jagdish	Verma Malik	Lata Mangeshkar
Waaris	2560	"Khud Ko Samajh Na Akeli"	Uttam-Jagdish	Verma Malik	solo
Waqt Ki Awaz	2561	"I Want To Hit Somebody"	Bappi Lahiri	Indeevar	Asha Bhosle
Waqt Ki Awaz	2562	"Ladki Akeli Tu Bhi Akela"	Bappi Lahiri	Indeevar	Asha Bhosle
Waqt Ki Awaz	2563	"Guru Guru Jao Guru"	Bappi Lahiri	Indeevar	Asha Bhosle
Woh Mili Thi	2564	"Hamein Kya Garaz"	Laxmikant-Pyarelal	Majrooh Sultanpuri	Asha Bhosle
Woh Mili Thi	2565	"Tu Laila Main Majnu"	Bappi Lahiri	Gauhar Kanpuri	Usha Mangeshkar
Woh Mili Thi	2566	"Chhone Se Maila Ho"	Bappi Lahiri	Farooq Kaiser	Meena Patki
Zalzala	2567	"Are Chakoo Chale"	R D Burman	Indeevar	Kavita Krishnamurthy

==== 1989 ====
Film	No.	Song	Composer(s)	Writer(s)	Co-artist(s)
Aakhri Badla	2568	"Mann Kare Yaad Woh Din"	Salil Chowdhury	Yogesh	solo
Aakhri Badla	2569	"O Mere Saathi Re"	Salil Chowdhury	Yogesh	Lata Mangeshkar
Albela	2570	"Mamaji Mamaji"	Bappi Lahiri	Anjaan	solo
Daata	2571	"Rona Dhona Chhod"	Kalyanji-Anandji	Anjaan	Alka Yagnik
Daata	2572	"Babul Ka Ghar"	Kalyanji-Anandji	Anjaan	Alka Yagnik
Daata	2573	"Babul Ka Ghar" (sad)	Kalyanji-Anandji	Anjaan	Alka Yagnik
Do Qaidi	1574	"Hanste Jaana Tum"	Laxmikant-Pyarelal	Sameer	solo
Dost Garibon Ka	2575	"Ab Bol Kya Bolta Hai"	Laxmikant-Pyarelal	Anand Bakshi	solo
Gair Kanooni	2576	"Saare Shehar Mein Ek Ladki"	Bappi Lahiri	Indeevar	Asha Bhosle
Galiyon Ka Badshah	2577	"Aaya Main Pyaar Ka Paigham Leke"	Kalyanji-Anandji	Indeevar	solo
Galiyon Ka Badshah	2578	"Kya Yeh Mumkin Hai"	Kalyanji-Anandji	Indeevar	Asha Bhosle
Guru	2579	"Daru Kharab"	Bappi Lahiri	Indeevar	solo
Ilaaka	2580	"Deva Ho Deva"	Nadeem-Shravan	Anjaan	Asha Bhosle
Ilaaka	2581	"Khali Bottle Ki Tarah"	Nadeem-Shravan	Anwar Sagar	Asha Bhosle
Joshilaay	2582	"Joshilaay Woh Shahzaade Hain"	R D Burman	Javed Akhtar	solo
Mamta Ki Chhaon Mein	2583	"Mera Geet Adhoora Hai"	Kishore Kumar	Shailendra	solo
Mamta Ki Chhaon Mein	2584	"Teri Jeevan Gaadi"	Kishore Kumar	Hasrat Jaipuri	solo
Manu The Great	2585	"Main Bana Bawarchi"	Ravi	Ravi	solo
Mil Gayee Manzil Mujhe	2586	"Tum Jo Mili To Phool Khile"	R. D. Burman	Anand Bakshi	Asha Bhosle
Mil Gayee Manzil Mujhe	2587	"Yeh Zindagi Ka Fasana Hai Kya"	R. D. Burman	Anand Bakshi	Asha Bhosle
Mil Gayee Manzil Mujhe	2588	"Ek Taraf Tum Ek Taraf Hum"	R. D. Burman	Anand Bakshi	Asha Bhosle, Shailendra Singh
Prem Pratigyaa	2589	"Sheeshe Ki Umar"	Bappi Lahiri	Indeevar	solo
Prem Pratigyaa	2590	"Baahon Mein Botal"	Bappi Lahiri	Indeevar	Asha Bhosle
Sachché Ká Bol-Bálá	2591	"Tanha Main Akela"	Bappi Lahiri	Amit Khanna	solo
Sachché Ká Bol-Bálá	2592	"Yeh Hawaein"	Bappi Lahiri	Amit Khanna	Asha Bhosle
Sahara	2593	"Dosto Sathiyo" (version 1)	Kalyanji-Anandji	Anjaan	solo
Sahara	2594	"Dosto Sathiyo" (version 2)	Kalyanji-Anandji	Anjaan	solo
Sahara	2595	"Nasha Hi Nasha"	Kalyanji-Anandji	Anjaan	Sadhana Sargam
Sikka	2596	"Adhi Raat Ko Aankh Khuli"	Bappi Lahiri	Indeevar	Asha Bhosle
Souten Ki Beti	2597	"Kaun Sunega Kisko Sunaayen"	Ved Pal	Saawan Kumar Tak	solo
Souten Ki Beti	2598	"Barah Mahine Line Maari"	Ved Pal	Saawan Kumar Tak	Meghna Shrivastava"
Souten Ki Beti	2599	"Yeh Jo Halka Halka Suroor Hai"	Ved Pal	Saawan Kumar Tak	Anuradha Paudwal
Taaqatwar	2600	"I Am John D'Mello"	Anu Malik	Indeevar, Sameer	solo
Tauheen	2601	"Tujhe Usse Mohabbat Hai"	Bappi Lahiri	Indeevar	Asha Bhosle
Toofan	2602	"Aaya Aaya Toofan"	Anu Malik	Indeevar	solo
Tujhe Nahin Chhodunga	2603	"Hum To Bemaut Mare Gaye"	C. P. Bhati	Hasan Kamaal	solo
Ustaad	2604	"O Jaane Jaana"	Anu Malik	Indeevar	Kavita Krishnamurthy
Ustaad	2605	"Naam Mera Shankar"	Anu Malik	Indeevar	solo

=== 1990s ===
==== 1990 ====
Film	No.	Song	Composer(s)	Writer(s)	Co-artist(s)
Amba	2606	"Aurat Zaat Mard Se Jhagda"	Laxmikant-Pyarelal	Anand Bakshi	solo
Chhotu Ka Badla	2607	"Hum Hain Allah Ke Bande"	Deepen Chatterjee	Sameer	solo
Chhotu Ka Badla	2608	"Teri Maaya Tu Hi Jaane"	Deepen Chatterjee	Sameer	Shakti Thakur
C.I.D.	2609	"Sapna Kahun Apna Kahun"	Kalyanji-Anandji	Anjaan	solo
Naya Khoon	2610	"Main Gareeb Dilwala Hoon"	Usha Khanna	Indeevar	Anuradha Paudwal
Naya Khoon	2611	"Dard Sabhi Ka Ek Hi Jaisa"	Usha Khanna	Indeevar	Anuradha Paudwal
Pyasi Nigahen	2612	"Pehli Baar Maine Yahin Tujhko"	Vidyut Goswami	Manzar Saburi	Alka Yagnik
Shandaar	2613	"Ek Main Hoon"	Bappi Lahiri	Anjaan	Alisha Chinai
Wafaa	2614	"Jawaani Rang Daalo"	Mandheer-Jatin	Anjaan, Kafeel Azar	Sulakshana Pandit
Wafaa	2615	"Yeh Sach Hai Ki Jeevan Mein"	Mandheer-Jatin	Anjaan, Kafeel Azar	solo

==== 1991 ====
Film	No.	Song	Composer(s)	Writer(s)	Co-artist(s)
Begunaah	2616	"Tere Mere Pyaar Ka Aisa Naata Hai"	Rajesh Roshan	Nida Fazli	Sadhana Sargam
Begunaah	2617	"Tere Mere Pyaar Ka Aisa Naata Hai" (male)	Rajesh Roshan	Nida Fazli	solo
Garajna	2618	"Mushkil Nahin Paani Ki Dhar"	Bappi Lahiri	Anjaan, Indeevar	Asha Bhosle
Jigarwala	2619	"Badi Mushkil Mein Jaan Hai Phansi"	Nadeem-Shravan	Surendra Sathi	Johnny Whiskey, Shahid Bijnauri
Iraada	2620	"Pehle Pet Pooja"	Kalyanji-Anandji	Anjaan	solo
Iraada	2621	"Rang Pyaar Ka Chadha"	Kalyanji-Anandji	Anjaan	Alka Yagnik
Laal Paree	2622	"Mere Dil Mein Utar Jaana"	Nadeem-Shravan	Anwar Sagar	solo

==== 1992 ====
Film	No.	Song	Composer(s)	Writer(s)	Co-artist(s)
Gori	2623	"Mehfil Mein Tu"	Shankar-Jaikishan, Enoch Daniels	Sudhakar Sharma	solo

==== 1993 ====
Film	No.	Song	Composer(s)	Writer(s)	Co-artist(s)
Mutthi Bhar Zamin	2624	"Kaalu Mere Yaara"	Amar-Utpal	Anand Bakshi	solo
Mutthi Bhar Zamin	2625	"Hum Saare Barabar Hai"	Amar-Utpal	Anand Bakshi	solo
Mutthi Bhar Zamin	2626	"Hum Ban Gaye Sharabi"	Amar-Utpal	Anand Bakshi	solo
Shatrutaa	2627	"Kachche Ghar Sahi"	Kalyanji-Anandji	Indeevar, Maya Govind	solo
Shatrutaa	2628	Kachche Ghar Sahi" (sad)	Kalyanji-Anandji	Indeevar, Maya Govind	solo
Shatrutaa	2629	"Mujhe Apna Bana Le"	Kalyanji-Anandji	Indeevar, Maya Govind	Alka Yagnik

==== 1994 ====
Film	No.	Song	Composer(s)	Writer(s)	Co-artist(s)
Mr. Shrimati	2630	"Aashiq Ki Hai Baraat"	Babla	Prakash Mehra	solo
Saboot Maangta Hai Qanoon	2631	"Batao Ae Duniawalon"	Kalyanji-Anandji	Mahendra Dalvi	Sadhana Sargam

==== 1997 ====
Film	No.	Song	Composer(s)	Writer(s)	Co-artist(s)
Aakhri Sanghursh	2632	"Diya Dil Tujhko Diya"	Hemant Bhosle	Anjaan	Asha Bhosle

=== 2000s-2010s ===
==== 2001 ====
Film	No.	Song	Composer(s)	Writer(s)	Co-artist(s)
Do Yaar	2633	"Main Pardesi Seedha Saadha"	Usha Khanna	Indeevar, Omkar Verma, Naqsh Lyallpuri	solo

==== 2005 ====
Film	No.	Song	Composer(s)	Writer(s)	Co-artist(s)
Double Cross	2634	"Hum Bewafa"	R D Burman, DJ Aqeel		solo
Double Cross	2635	"Nahin Nahin Abhi Nahin"	R D Burman, DJ Aqeel		Asha Bhosle
Double Cross	2636	"Jaanu Meri Jaan"	R D Burman, DJ Aqeel		Asha Bhosle, Mohammed Rafi, Usha Mangeshkar
Bluffmaster	2637	"Do Aur Do Paanch" (remix)	Rajesh Roshan	Anjaan	solo

==== 2007 ====
Film	No.	Song	Composer(s)	Writer(s)	Co-artist(s)
Chain Kulii Ki Main Kulii	2638	"Hum The Woh Thi" (remix)	S D Burman	Majrooh Sultanpuri	solo

==== 2008 ====
Film	No.	Song	Composer(s)	Writer(s)	Co-artist(s)
Don Muthu Swami	2639	"Pyaar Do Pyaar Lo"	Anu Malik	N/A	Anand Kumar C.
Bachna Ae Haseeno	2640	"Bachna Ae Haseeno"	R. D. Burman, Vishal-Shekhar	Anvita Dutt Guptan	Sumit Kumar, Vishal Dadlani

==== 2013 ====
Film	No.	Song	Composer(s)	Writer(s)	Co-artist(s)
Love in Bombay	2641	"Rani Nacho Chhamak Chham, Aage Tum, Peechhe Hum"	Shankar–Jaikishan	Majrooh Sultanpuri	Mohammad Rafi
Love in Bombay	2642	"Majha Naav Aahe Ganpatrao"	Shankar–Jaikishan	Majrooh Sultanpuri	solo
Love in Bombay	2643	"Jai Kali Kalkattewali"	Shankar–Jaikishan	Majrooh Sultanpuri	solo
Love in Bombay	2644	"Matak Mere Cheeta"	Shankar–Jaikishan	Majrooh Sultanpuri	solo

==== 2014 ====
Film	No.	Song	Composer(s)	Writer(s)	Co-artist(s)
Tamanchey	2645	"Pyaar Mein Dil Pe"	R D Burman, Krsna	Anjaan, Puneet Sharma	Bappi Lahiri, Asha Bhosle
Tamanchey	2646	"Pyar Mein Dil Pe Maar De Goli" (Munna & Babu Love Remix)	R D Burman, Krsna	Anjaan, Puneet Sharma	Bappi Lahiri, Luv O Trigger and Asha Bhosle
Tamanchey	2647	"Pyaar Mein Dil Pe" (Disco Remix)	R D Burman, Krsna	Anjaan, Puneet Sharma	Bappi Lahiri, Luv O Trigger and Asha Bhosle

==== 2019 ====
Film	No.	Song	Composer(s)	Writer(s)	Co-artist(s)
Student of the Year 2	2648	"Yeh Jawani Song"	R. D. Burman, Vishal-Shekhar	Anand Bakshi, Anvita Dutt Guptan	Payal Dev, Vishal Dadlani

=== 2020s ===
==== 2026 ====
Film	No.	Song	Composer(s)	Writer(s)	Co-artist(s)
Dhurandhar: The Revenge	2649	"Bekasi"	R. D. Burman, Shashwat Sachdev	Anand Bakshi	

== Hindi Non-film songs ==
Year	Film	Song	Music Director(s)	Lyrics	Co-singer(s)
1981	Non Film	"Zindagi Jua Hai"	Salil Chowdhury		solo
1972	Non Film	"Ladkiyon Ko Chahiye Woh Ladkon"	Madan Mohan	N/A	solo
1972	Non Film	"Aaj Mujhe Jal Jaane Bhi Do"	Madan Mohan	N/A	solo
1949	Non Film	"Pandrah August Ki Punyatithi"	Bala Singh	Keshav Trivedi	R.P. Sharma
1947 or 1948	Non Film	"O Bhoolane Wale"	Bholanath	Raja Mehadi Ali Khan	solo
1946 or 1947	Non Film	"Jis Dil Ne Mohabbat Ki"	Kewal Sharma	Ramesh Gupta	solo

== Assamese songs ==
Year	Film	Song	Composer(s)	Writer(s)	Co-artist(s)
1969	Chikmik Bijuli	"Pakkhiraj Ghora"	Bhupen Hazarika	Bhupen Hazarika	Asha Bhosle

== Bengali songs ==
Year (Note: Year of release of films or publishing of the records/cassettes, not of year of recording exactly)	Film	No.	Song	Composer(s)	Co-artist(s)	Writer(s)
1950	Samar	1	Sundari Lo Sundari	S.D.Burman	Geeta Dutt, Arun Kumar, and chorus	Gauriprasanna Mazumder or Mohini Chowdhury
1950	Samar	2	Rangeen Haoa	S.D.Burman	solo	Gauriprasanna Mazumder or Mohini Chowdhury
1958	Lukochuri	3	Singh Nei Tobu Naam Tar Singha	Hemanta Mukherjee	solo	Gauriprasanna Mazumder
1958	Lukochuri	4	Ek Palaker Ektu Dekha	Hemanta Mukherjee	solo	Gauriprasanna Mazumder
1958	Lukochuri	5	Mayabono Biharini Horini	Rabindranath Tagore	Ruma Guha Thakurta	Rabindranath Tagore
1958	Lukochuri	6	Ei To Hethay Kunjochhayay	Hemanta Mukherjee	Ruma Guha Thakurta	Gauriprasanna Mazumder
1958	Lukochuri	7	Sudhu Ektukani Chaowa	Hemanta Mukherjee	Geeta Dutt	Gauriprasanna Mazumder
1961	Madhya Rater Tara	8	Janmadin	Hemanta Mukherjee	solo	Gauriprasanna Mazumder
1964	Charulata	9	Ami Chini Go Chini Tomare	Rabindranath Tagore	solo	Rabindranath Tagore
1965	Ektuku Chhowa Laage	10	"Saraswatir Seba Kori"	Other two songs were tuned by Hemanta Mukherjee	solo	Gouriprasanna Mazumdar
1965	Ektuku Chhowa Laage	11	"Ek Tuku Chhowa Laage" (**It is a Tagore song, lyrics and composition by Rabindranath Tagore)	Other two songs were tuned by Hemanta Mukherjee	solo	Gouriprasanna Mazumdar
1965	Ektuku Chhowa Laage	12	"Dustaro Parabar Periye"	Other two songs were tuned by Hemanta Mukherjee	Hemanta Mukherjee	Gouriprasanna Mazumdar
1967	Dushtu Projapoti	13	"Chholoki Chholoki Mon"	Hemanta Mukherjee	solo	Gouriprasanna Mazumdar and Shyam Chakraborty
1967	Dushtu Projapoti	14	"Guten Morgen Bonjo"	Hemanta Mukherjee	solo	Gouriprasanna Mazumdar and Shyam Chakraborty
1967	Dushtu Projapoti	15	"Eureka Eureka"	Hemanta Mukherjee	Ranu Mukherjee	Gouriprasanna Mazumdar and Shyam Chakraborty
1968	Shesh Theke Shuru	16	Bolo Hori Hori Bol	Nachiketa Ghosh	solo	Gauriprasanna Mazumdar
1969	Sabarmati	17	Tak Dhin Dhin Ta	Gopen Mullick	Ila Basu	Gauriprasanna Mazumdar
1970	Padmagolap	18	"Phire Jao Phire Jao"	Shyamal Mitra	solo	Gauriprasanna Mazumdar
1970	Padmagolap	19	"Megh Aar Kuashay Hok"	Shyamal Mitra	Arati Mukherjee	Gauriprasanna Mazumdar
1970	Rajkumari	20	"Bondho Dwarer Andhokare"	R D Burman	Kishore Kumar with Asha Bhosle (with a dialogue portion voiced by Tanuja)	Gouriprasanna Majumder
1970	Rajkumari	21	"Koto Nari Achhe E Gokule"	R D Burman	Kishore Kumar with Asha Bhosle (with a dialogue portion voiced by Tanuja)	Gouriprasanna Majumder
1970	Rajkumari	22	"Tobu Bole Keno Sohosai"	R D Burman	solo	Gouriprasanna Majumder
1970	Rajkumari	23	"E Ki Holo"	R D Burman	solo	Gouriprasanna Majumder
1972	Anindita	24	"Ogo Nirupoma"	Hemanta Mukherjee	solo	Mukul Dutt
1975	Amanush	25	"Bipin Babur Karon Sudha"	Shyamal Mitra	solo	Gouriprasanna Mazumdar
1975	Amanush	26	"Ki Ashay Badhi Khelaghor"	Shyamal Mitra	solo	Gouriprasanna Mazumdar
1975	Amanush	27	"Jodi Hoi Chorkata"	Shyamal Mitra	Asha Bhosle	Gouriprasanna Mazumdar
1977	Ananda Ashram	28	"Prithibi Bodle Geche"	Shyamal Mitra	solo	Gouriprasanna Mazumdar
1977	Ananda Ashram	29	"Asha Chilo Bhalobasha Chilo"	Shyamal Mitra	solo	Gouriprasanna Mazumdar
1977	Ananda Ashram	30	"Amar Shopno Tumi"	Shyamal Mitra	Asha Bhosle	Gouriprasanna Mazumdar
1977	Kabita	31	"Shuno Shuno Go Sobe"	Salil Chowdhury	solo	Salil Chowdhury
1977	Proxy	32	"Ki Kore Bojhai Toder"	Hemanta Mukherjee	solo	Gauriprasanna Mazumdar
1978	Aradhana	33	"Eto Kache Dujone"	S D Burman	solo	Gouriprasanna Mazumdar
1978	Aradhana	34	"Mor Shopner Saathi"	S D Burman	solo	Gouriprasanna Mazumdar
1978	Aradhana	35	"Gunjone Dole Je Bhromor"	S D Burman	Asha Bhosle	Gouriprasanna Mazumdar
1978	Aradhana	36	"Aaj Hridoye Bhalobeshe"	S D Burman	Lata Mangeshkar	Gouriprasanna Mazumdar
1978	Bandie	37	"Monehoy Swarge Achi"	Shyamal Mitra	solo	Gauriprasanna Mazumdar
1978	Bandie	38	"Mone Rong Na Lagle"	Shyamal Mitra	Asha Bhosle	Gauriprasanna Mazumdar
1978	Lal Kuthi	39	"Dhole Jete Jete"	Sapan-Jagmohan	Asha Bhosle	Mukul Dutt
1978	Lal Kuthi	40	"Karo Keu Noiko Ami"	Sapan-Jagmohan	solo	Mukul Dutt
1978	Nishan	41	"Tumi Je Premer"	Shyamal Mitra	Aarti Mukherjee	Gauriprasanna Mazumdar
1978	Nishan	42	"Pranbhora Shopno"	Shyamal Mitra	Chandrani Mukherjee	Gauriprasanna Mazumdar
1979	Mother	43	"Aha Ki Darun Dekhte"	Bireswar Sarkar	solo	Pulak Banerjee
1979	Mother	44	"Amar Naam Anthony"	Bireswar Sarkar	solo	Pulak Banerjee
1979	Mother	45	"Ek Je Chhilo"	Bireswar Sarkar	Asha Bhosle	Pulak Banerjee
1979	Prahari	46	Ahaha Keno Porer Sona	Sapan Jagmohan	Asha Bhosle	Mukul Dutta
1981	Anusandhan	47	"Bolo Hori Bol Hori Bol"	R D Burman	solo	Gouriprasanna Mazumdar
1981	Anusandhan	48	"Amar Shopno Je Sotty Holo Aaj"	R D Burman	Lata Mangeshkar	Gouriprasanna Mazumdar
1981	Anusandhan	49	"Phoolkoli Re Phoolkoli"	R D Burman	Asha Bhosle	Gouriprasanna Mazumdar
1981	Kalankini	50	"Ekoi Sathe Haat Dhore"	Shyamal Mitra	Asha Bhosle	Gouriprasanna Mazumdar
1981	Kalankini	51	"Kono Kaj Noy Aaj"	Shyamal Mitra	Asha Bhosle	Gouriprasanna Mazumdar
1981	Kalankini	52	"Kichhu Kotha Chhilo Chokhe"	Shyamal Mitra	solo	Gouriprasanna Mazumdar
1981	Kalankini Kankabati	53	"Adho Alo Chhyaate"	R D Burman	Asha Bhosle	Swapan Chakraborty
1981	Ogo Bodhu Sundori	54	"Shikhte Tomake Hobei"	Bappi Lahiri	solo	Bibhuti Mukhopadhyay
1981	Ogo Bodhu Sundori	55	"Ei To Jibon"	Bappi Lahiri	solo	Bibhuti Mukhopadhyay
1981	Ogo Bodhu Sundori	56	"Nari Choritro Bejay Jotil"	Bappi Lahiri	solo	Bibhuti Mukhopadhyay
1981	Ogo Bodhu Sundori	57	"Ami Ekjon Shanto Shishto"	Bappi Lahiri	solo	Bibhuti Mukhopadhyay
1981	Pratishodh	58	"Aaj Milon Tithir Purnima Chand"	Ajoy Das	solo	Pulak Banerjee
1981	Pratishodh	59	"Hoyto Amake Karo Mone Nei"	Ajoy Das	solo	Pulak Banerjee
1981	Tiger	60	"Ei Aamar Sesh Gaan" ("Jiboner Sesh Gaan")	Mrinal Banarjee	Solo	Gouriprasanna Majumder
1982	Troyee	61	"Aro Kachhakachhi"	R D Burman	Asha Bhosle	Swapan Chakraborty
1982	Troyee	62	"Jaana Ojana Pothe Cholechhi"	R D Burman	Asha Bhosle, R D Burman	Swapan Chakraborty
1982	Troyee	63	"Ek Taanete Jemon Temon"	R D Burman	Swapan Chakraborty	Swapan Chakraborty
1982	Sankalpa	64	Eto Kanna Eto Noy Gaan	Ajoy Das	solo	Gauriprasanna Mazumdar
1983	Jibon Moron	65	"Opare Thakbo Ami"	Ajoy Das	solo	Pulak Banerjee
1983	Jibon Moron	66	"Ki Upohar Sajiye"	Ajoy Das	solo	Pulak Banerjee
1983	Jibon Moron	67	"Amar E Kontho Bhore" (male)	Ajoy Das	solo	Pulak Banerjee
1983	Parabat Priya	68	"Onek Jomano Byatha"	Ajoy Das	solo	Pulak Bandopadhyay
1983	Protidan	69	"Ho Re Re Re"	Bappi Lahiri	solo	Gauriprasanna Mazumdar
1984	Dujone	70	"Hey Jore Cholo"	Bappi Lahiri	solo	Bibhuti Mukherjee
1984	Teen Murti	71	"Path Hok Bondhur" ("Ei Teen Murti")*	R D Burman	*with Shakti Thakur and Shailendra Singh solo	Gauriprasanna Mazumdar
1984	Teen Murti	72	"Emon Mojar Shohor"	R D Burman	*with Shakti Thakur and Shailendra Singh solo	Gauriprasanna Mazumdar
1984	Teen Murti	73	"Mon Churi Chhara Kaj Nei"	R D Burman	Lata Mangeshkar	Gauriprasanna Mazumdar
1984	Teen Murti	74	"Notun Seto Notun"	R D Burman	Asha Bhosle	Gauriprasanna Mazumdar
1984	Mohonar Dike	75	"Nai Nai E Andhar Theke"	Swapan Chakraborty	solo	Swapan Chakraborty
1984	Ghare Baire	76	Bidhir Badhan Katbe Tumi	Rabindranath Tagore	solo	Rabindranath Tagore
1984	Ghare Baire	77	Bujhte Nari Naree Ki Chay	Rabindranath Tagore	solo	Akshay Kumar Boral
1984	Ghare Baire	78	Chal Re Chal Sab Bharatsantan	Jyotirindranath Tagore	solo	Jyotirindranath Tagore
1984	Prarthana	79	Cheyechi Jare Ami	Basudeb Chakraborty	solo	Mukul Dutt
1984	Dadamoni	80	Aaj Subhadine Jodi	Ajoy Das	Arati Mukherjee	Pulak Bandopadhyay
1985	Antarale	81	"Aaj Ei Dintake"	Bappi Lahiri	solo	Gauriprasanna Mazumdar
1985	Anyay Abichar	82	"Rui Katla Ilish" (male)	R D Burman	solo	Gouriprasanna Mazumdar
1985	Anyay Abichar	83	"Dekhle Kemon Tumi Khel"	R D Burman	solo	Gouriprasanna Mazumdar
1985	Anyay Abichar	84	"Chherona Chherona Haat"	R D Burman	Sabina Yasmin	Gouriprasanna Mazumdar
1985	Lal Mahal	85	"Phota Je Rokto Golap"	Ajoy Das	solo	Gauriprasanna Mazumdar
1985	Milon Tithi	86	"Aar To Noy Beshidin"	Ajoy Das	solo	Pulak Bandopadhyay
1985	Milon Tithi	87	"Sukheo Kende Othe Mon"	Ajoy Das	solo	Pulak Bandopadhyay
1985	Rakta Jaba	88	Ore Gyangar Gyang	Neeta Sen	Kartik Kumar and Basanta Kumar	Gauriprasanna Mazumdar
1985	Rakta Jaba	89	Chokhe Chokh Rekhe	Neeta Sen	solo	Gauriprasanna Mazumdar
1985	Harishchandra Shaibya	90	O Ma Patit Pabani Gange	Ravindra Jain	solo	Bibhuti Mukhopadhyay
1985	Harishchandra Shaibya	91	Drama Drimi Drimi	Ravindra Jain	solo	Bibhuti Mukhopadhyay
1985	Sandhya Pradip	92	Aaj Mukhete Bolle Tumi	Mirnal Banerjee	solo	Pulak Bandopadhyay
1986	Artanad	93	Sonabo Aaj Ek Abhagir	Robin Banerjee	solo	Robin Banerjee and Chandan Mukherjee
1986	Artanad	94	Ghume Ghore Sopno Dekhe	Robin Banerjee	solo	Robin Banerjee and Chandan Mukherjee
1986	Abhiman	95	"Dujonete Lekha Gaan"	Ajoy Das	solo	Pulak Banerjee
1986	Abhiman	96	"Thik Saare Panchta Baje"	Ajoy Das	solo	Pulak Banerjee
1986	Dui Adhyay	97	"Akash Pothe Prem Korechi"	Soumitra Banerjee	solo	Ajoy Biswas
1986	Anurager Chowa	98	"Ami Je Ke Tomar" (male)	Ajoy Das	solo	Gouriprasanna Mazumdar
1986	Urbashi	99	"Nojor Diyona"	Bappi Lahiri	solo	Bibhuti Mukherjee
1986	Urbashi	100	"Bam Bhole"	Bappi Lahiri	solo	Bibhuti Mukherjee
1986	Modhumoy	101	Alor Ashay Pradeeper	Dillp - Dillip	solo	Gauriprasanna Mazumdar
1986	Bauma	102	Phire Elo Na Aar Se	Kanu Bhattacharya	solo	Ranjit Dey
1986	Bauma	103	Pita Swarga Pita Dharma	Kanu Bhattacharya	solo	Ranjit Dey
1987	Amar Kantak	104	"Tumi Maa Amake"	Ajoy Das	solo	Gouriprasanna Mazumdar
1987	Amar Kantak	105	"Ei To Jibon (Chitatei Sob Shesh)"	Ajoy Das	solo	Gouriprasanna Mazumdar
1987	Amar Sangi	106	"Chirodini Tumi Je Amar"	Bappi Lahiri	solo	Pulak Banerjee
1987	Guru Dakshina	107	"Kotha Acho Gurudev"	Bappi Lahiri	solo	Bhabesh Kundu
1987	Guru Dakshina	108	"Tomra Jotoi Aghat Koro"	Bappi Lahiri	solo	Bhabesh Kundu
1987	Guru Dakshina	109	"E Amar Gurudakshina"	Bappi Lahiri	solo	Bhabesh Kundu
1987	Mouno Mukhor	110	"Sei Tanpura Achhe"	Abhijeet Banerjee	solo	Shibdas Banerjee
1987	Mouno Mukhor	111	"Aha Kothok Naki Kathakali"	Abhijeet Banerjee	solo	Shibdas Banerjee
1987	Mouno Mukhor	112	"Shilong Er Pine Bone"	Abhijeet Banerjee	Anuradha Paudwal	Shibdas Banerjee
1987	Paap Punyo	113	"Bhalobasha Chhara Aar" (male)	Ajoy Das	solo	Pulak Bandopadhyay
1987	Paap Punyo	114	"Manglu Ami Janglee Ami"	Ajoy Das	solo	Pulak Bandopadhyay
1987	Paap Punyo	115	"Babusaab Baniye Dilo"	Ajoy Das	Uday Raj	Pulak Bandopadhyay
1987	Dolon Chapa	116	"Amaroto Gaan Chhilo"	Kanu Bhattacharya	solo	Pulak Bandopadhyay
1987	Dolon Chapa	117	"Ore Mon Pagol"	Kanu Bhattacharya	solo	Shankar Ghosh
1988	Agun	118	"Khali Pete Korle Bhojon"	R D Burman	Shakti Thakur	Swapan Chakraborty
1988	Antaranga	119	"Panch Goleree Khodder Noy"	Bappi Lahiri	solo	Gauriprasanna Mazumdar
1988	Chhottur Protishodh	120	"Tumi Chhara Goti Nei"	Dipen Chattopadhyay	solo	Swapan Chakraborty
1988	Chhottur Protishodh	121	"Tomar Khela"	Dipen Chattopadhyay	Shakti Thakur	Swapan Chakraborty
1988	Debibaran	122	"O Babu Jotoi Tomra" ("Sahaje Jay Na Chena")	Bappi Lahiri	solo	Gauriprasanna Mazumdar
1988	Jyoti	123	"Chokhete Shaon Gaay"	Sapan-Jagmohan	solo	Mukul Dutt
1988	Jyoti	124	"Parina Soite" ("Dhowa Dhowa Dhowa")	Sapan-Jagmohan	solo	Mukul Dutt
1988	Surer Akashe	125	"Kotha Dilam"	Swapan Chakraborty	Asha Bhosle	Swapan Chakraborty
1988	Surer Akashe	126	"Kotha Dilam" (sad)	Swapan Chakraborty	Asha Bhosle	Swapan Chakraborty
1988	Surer Akashe	127	"Premer Khela Ke Bujhite Pare"	Swapan Chakraborty	Srabanti Majumdar [Published as solo (both male and female versions) on records and cassettes]	Swapan Chakraborty
1988	Tumi Koto Sundor	128	"Jaani Jekhanei Thako"	Mirnal Banerjee	Anupama Deshpande	Pulak Bandopadhyay
1988	Tumi Koto Sundor	129	"Tomar Barir Samne Diye"	Mirnal Banerjee	solo	Pulak Bandopadhyay
1988	Ora Char Jon	130	Du Chokhe Rajani	Arun Rabin	solo	Pulak Banerjee
1988	Ora Char Jon	131	Du Chokhe Rajani Sad Version	Arun Rabin	solo	Pulak Banerjee
1988	Dena Pawna	132	Tumi Swarger Desh Theke	Ajoy Das	solo	Pulak Banerjee
1988	Channachara	133	Jibon Onko Take	Mirnal Bandopadhyay	solo	Shibdas Bandopadhyay or Tapash Dutta
1988	Apaman	134	Moder Neshay Ami Chur	Rabin Banerjee	solo	Chandan Mukherjee
1989	Bandhobi	135	"Ei Jiboner Poth Soja Noy"	Manas Mukherjee	solo	Dulal Bhowmick
1989	Bandhobi	136	"Paglu Re Paglu"	Manas Mukherjee	solo	Shyamal Chatterjee
1989	Asha O Bhalobasha	137	"Natobar Nagor Tumi"	Bappi Lahiri	solo	Pulak Banerjee
1989	Asha O Bhalobasha	138	"Tumi Amar Asha"	Bappi Lahiri	solo	Pulak Banerjee
1989	Buddhuram	139	"Honeymoon"	Ajoy Das	Sandhyashree Dutta	Pulak Bandopadhyay
1990	Ashrita (Ranga Bhanga Chand)	140	"Neel Neel Akashe"	Hridaynath Mangeshkar	solo	Mithu Mukherjee
1990	Hirak Jayanti	141	"Bohudur Theke Ei Kotha""	Goutam Basu	solo	Pulak Bandopadhyay
1990	Manoshi	142	"Je Katha Moner Katha	Asit Ganguly	solo	Mukul Dutt
1990	Manoshi	143	"Swapna Emon Kore"	Asit Ganguly	solo	Mukul Dutt
1990	Manoshi	144	"Swapner Jadi Aar"	Asit Ganguly	solo	Mukul Dutt
1990	Swarna Trishna (Antarghat)	145	"O Amar Sojoni"	Salil Chowdhury	Lata Mangeshkar	Salil Chowdhury
1990	Swarna Trishna (Antarghat)	146	"Mone Pore Sei Sob Din"	Salil Chowdhury	solo	Salil Chowdhury
1990	Kagojer Nouka	147	Buker Agoon Nebhay Na	Chandan Roychowdhury	solo	Shekhar Sarkar
1990	Drishti	148	Ghumao Bodhu Aamar	Ravindra Jain	solo	Ravindra Jain

=== Unreleased Bengali Songs ===
Year	Film	No.	Song	Composer(s)	Co-artist(s)	Writer(s)
1957	Gouri	1	Se Ek Daar Kaker Sadh Hoilo	S.D. Burman	R.D Burman	Gauriprasanna Majumdar
N/A	Koyeler Kache	2	Chilam Jangli Janwar	Bappi Lahiri		Pulak Bandopadhyay
N/A	Koyeler Kache	3	Jangaleri Raja Ami Amar Proja Pasupakhi	Bappi Lahiri		Pulak Bandopadhyay
N/A	Koyeler Kache	4	Ami Shaala Aaj Raate	Bappi Lahiri		Pulak Bandopadhyay

== Kannada songs ==
Year	Film	Song	Composer(s)	Writer(s)	Co-artist(s)
1972	Kulla Agent 000	"Aadu Aata Aadu"	Rajan–Nagendra	Chi. Udaya Shankar	solo

== Malayalam songs ==
Year	Film	Song	Composer(s)	Writer(s)	Co-artist(s)
1974	Ayalathe Sundari	"Kora Kaagaz Tha Yeh Mann Mera"	S. D. Burman	Anand Bakshi	Lata Mangeshkar
1975	Ayodhya	"ABCD Chettan"	G. Devarajan	P. Bhaskaran	solo

== Marathi songs ==
Year	Film	Song	Composer(s)	Writer(s)	Co-artist(s)
1987	Gammat Jammat	"Ashwini Ye Na"	Arun Paudwal	Shantaram Nandgaokar	Anuradha Paudwal
1988	Maza Pati Karodpati	"Tuzhi Mazhi Jodi Jamli"	Arun Paudwal	Shantaram Nandgaokar	Anuradha Paudwal
1989	Gholat Ghol	"Ha Gora Gora Mukhada"	Anil Mohile	Sudhir Nandode	Solo
