= Moondram Pirai =

1982 film by Balu Mahendra

- Theatrical release poster
- Directed by: Balu Mahendra
- Written by: Balu Mahendra
- Produced by: G. Thyagarajan; G. Saravanan
- Starring: Kamal Haasan; Sridevi
- Cinematography: Balu Mahendra
- Edited by: D. Vasu
- Music by: Ilaiyaraaja
- Production company: Sathya Jyothi Films
- Distributed by: Sathya Jyothi Films
- Release date: 19 February 1982
- Running time: 143 minutes
- Country: India
- Language: Tamil
- Budget: ₹33 lakh

Moondram Pirai (transl. The third crescent) (Note: In Tamil, Moondram Pirai or the third crescent refers to the crescent seen on the third day following new moon day.) is a 1982 Indian Tamil-language romantic drama film written, directed and filmed by Balu Mahendra. The film stars Kamal Haasan and Sridevi, while Y. G. Mahendran, Silk Smitha and Poornam Viswanathan played supporting roles. It revolves around a school teacher who rescues a woman with retrograde amnesia, from a brothel, and protects her in his house located in Ketti. The rest of the film shows how the woman recovers her memory with the teacher's help.

Moondram Pirai is the first film produced by G. Thyagarajan and G. Saravanan's Sathya Jyothi Films. It was predominantly shot in Ooty and Ketti, with further shooting also taking place in Bangalore. The music for the film was composed by Ilaiyaraaja, with lyrics written by Kannadasan, Vairamuthu and Gangai Amaran. It also featured the last song written by Kannadasan to be recorded before his death in 1981.

Moondram Pirai was released on 19 February 1982 and received critical acclaim. It was a box office success and had a theatrical run of over a year. The film won two National Film Awards: Best Actor for Kamal Haasan, and Best Cinematography for Balu Mahendra. It also won the Best Director – Tamil award for Balu Mahendra at the Filmfare Awards South, and five Tamil Nadu State Film Awards, including Best Film (third prize), Best Actor (Kamal) and Best Actress (Sridevi). Mahendra remade the film in Hindi as Sadma (1983), with Kamal Haasan, Sridevi and Smitha reprising their roles.

== Plot ==
Bhagyalakshmi, a young woman, has a car accident while returning from a party and is hospitalised with severe head injuries. When she recovers, she is diagnosed with retrograde amnesia and she fails to recognise her own parents. She mentally regresses to the state of a child. While she is undergoing treatment, she is kidnapped and sold to the madam of a brothel. R. Srinivas, also known as Cheenu, comes to Madras to meet his old friend. Together, they visit the brothel for services rendered. The madam sends Bhagyalakshmi, renamed Vijaya, to his room. Cheenu realises that she is mentally still a child and pities her. He learns that she is from a cultured family, and that she was kidnapped and forced into prostitution.

Cheenu returns the next day and, after paying a huge sum to the madam, takes Vijaya out, supposedly on a pleasure trip. He takes her away to Ketti, where he is working as a school teacher. He takes her to his residence, where he protects her and also looks after her like a child. Viji, as she is called by Cheenu, has completely forgotten her past and becomes very close to him. When Viji accidentally spills ink over Cheenu's documents, angering him, their relationship is threatened, but they reconcile. Later, a local woodcutter named Natarajan lusts for Viji and nearly assaults her, but she manages to save herself. When she tells Cheenu about it, he becomes enraged and almost kills Natarajan, but is stopped by his neighbours who were informed of the incident by Viji. Meanwhile, the wife of Cheenu's headmaster is attracted to Cheenu, but he does not reciprocate her feelings.

Viji's father Vedachalam, who was searching for her through the police, releases a newspaper advertisement about his lost daughter. A co-passenger who had travelled with Cheenu and Viji from Madras to Ooty by train gives them a lead. Cheenu takes Viji to an Ayurvedic practitioner and leaves her there for a day's treatment. In his absence, the police come to his house searching for Viji. Finally, the police learn that Viji is getting treated at the doctor's place and reach there. Cheenu is unable to come as he is afraid of police action. The treatment goes through successfully. Viji regains her memory, but completely forgets about the period between her accident and recovery. From the doctor, Vedachalam learns that the person who had brought her there had been taking good care of their daughter; he withdraws his police complaint and they begin their journey to Madras with Viji.

After the police leave, Cheenu comes running after the car in which Viji is travelling. He follows them to the railway station and tries to gain Viji's attention, but she is unable to recognise him. Cheenu acts like a dancing monkey that Viji developed a liking for, but Viji, unable to comprehend, thinks he is insane and begging for food. Cheenu continues his futile attempts to gain her attention, and the train eventually leaves with Viji not recognising him. Cheenu, who was injured while chasing her car and trying to get her attention, walks away, heartbroken.

== Cast ==
- Kamal Haasan as R. Srinivas "Cheenu"
- Sridevi as Bhagyalaksmi / Vijaya "Viji"
- Y. G. Mahendran as Srinivas's friend
- Silk Smitha as Mrs. Viswanathan
- Gandhimathi as the madam of the brothel
- Poornam Viswanathan as Mr. Viswanathan
- S. R. Veeraraghavan as Vedachalam
- J. V. Ramana Murthi as the Ayurvedic practitioner
- K. Natraj as Natarajan

== Production ==
=== Development ===
Moondram Pirai was the first film produced by G. Thyagarajan and G. Saravanan's production company, Sathya Jyothi Films. Thyagarajan, who was looking after Sathya Movies owned by his father-in-law R. M. Veerappan, started Sathya Jyothi Films on his own to make "slightly offbeat films". Mani Ratnam and Thyagarajan had been friends since childhood as both their fathers were partners of Venus Movies. Ratnam introduced the director and cinematographer Balu Mahendra to Thyagarajan as Ratnam felt Thyagarajan would be the right person to produce the film that would later become Moondram Pirai. After hearing Mahendra's story, Thyagarajan's father liked the plot and asked him to proceed.

After the project was finalised, Mahendra took one month time to complete the script and he worked on the budget alongside film's production manager Govind. The budget was fixed at ₹33 lakh (equivalent to ₹7.4 crore or US$760,000 in 2026). A. Ramaswamy and D. Vasu were in charge of art direction and editing respectively.

=== Casting ===
While discussing the casting, Mahendra suggested Kamal Haasan as the lead actor as he "would do excellent work". Haasan has stated that, when Mahendra narrated the story of Moondram Pirai to him, he listened to Mahendra for about twenty minutes before accepting the role of the male lead Cheenu. The role of Bhagyalakshmi / Viji was initially offered to Sripriya, who could not accept the role due to her prior commitments. It was Haasan who successfully suggested Sridevi for the role.

Silk Smitha, who had done around 20 films by then and was considered only for performing item numbers, was cast as the headmaster's sexually excited wife, as Mahendra wanted a woman who was "sexy and at the same time a rustic beauty". Poornam Viswanathan was initially reluctant to portray the headmaster as it deviated from the character roles he was then known for, but after convincing by Mahendra, agreed.

=== Filming ===
Principal photography began with a puja at Prasad Studios. Moondram Pirai was predominantly shot in Ooty and Ketti, a small town situated close to the former. Shooting also took place in Bangalore. Mahendra shot the montage shots for the songs "Poongatru" and "Kanne Kalaimaane" simultaneously. The interior shots of "Kanne Kalaimaane" were shot within two days with Mahendra "would shoot the exterior portions while we were moving from one location to another".

For a minor fight scene involving Cheenu and Natarajan (K. Natraj), Haasan and Mahendra told the stunt choreographer that it shouldn look like a street brawl, rather than a "regular movie fight". Natraj and Haasan performed their own stunts by jumping into a stream water. Haasan ensured he looked fit in the song "Ponmeni Uruguthey" and worked out to get a "sculpted physique". This was the film's only song to have rehearsals for one week in Madras (later renamed Chennai). Mahendra did not want to shoot the song in "flat light"; he shot it "in the early morning, from 6am to 8am, then we'd take a break, and then, we'd assemble again by 4.30pm, and then shoot from 5pm to 7pm, as the sun was setting" and managed to finish the song in five days. In April 2006, Mahendra said that the inclusion of the song was "absolutely unnecessary"; the sole reason for its inclusion was the presence of Smitha in the song to help promote the film.

Mahendra did not find hiring a train expensive at that time; as a result, he hired a train for the film's scene where Cheenu and Viji depart for Ketti, and another train for the climax which was shot at the Ketti railway station. Although it was raining on the day the climax was shot, Mahendra decided to continue shooting the scene even though the rain was not part of the film's script. It took nearly five days to film the climax. (Note: In a 2018 article, The Times of India noted that the climax scene took three days to complete. However, Thyagarajan stated in 2022 that the scene was finished within five days.) The scene where Cheenu hits himself on the pole while walking towards the train was not planned; Haasan performed it in the middle of the shot. To shoot that scene, Mahendra sat on the steps of the train with a rope tied around his waist with crew holding and preventing him from falling down. Despite being in such a "precarious position", he managed to get the shot right and approved it in a single take. Haasan refused to use a double, and strove to make Cheenu's injuries look real, including giving the character a black eye and swollen lips.

In the post-production phase, Smitha's voice was dubbed by Anuradha. Mahendra supervised Anuradha's dubbing session and taught her the methods to emote the dialogues for Smitha in the film. While the film was under production the team was scoffed at for making a film about a youth falling in love with an amnesiac, and that the film would not be a box office success. The film uses intense violin music in both its opening and closing credits. The final length of the film was roughly 3,918 metres (12,854 ft).

== Themes and influences ==
Moondram Pirai depicts a young woman whose mental state regresses to that of a child following an accident. Sexuality and the repression of desire are dominant motifs, similar to Balu Mahendra's previous film Moodu Pani (1980). The film also explores the possibility of unresolved sexual tension between the protagonists. When asked about the reason amnesia was chosen for a disability, Mahendra said the disorder is used as a camouflage and as an excuse to portray relationships in the film. Film critic Baradwaj Rangan finds the sequence where Cheenu narrates the story of the Blue Jackal to Viji to be a distant echo of the arc negotiated by Cheenu: "He is, after all, a nobody [like the jackal] who, through a salubrious twist of fate, becomes the ruler of a woman's life, until he is restored, at the end, to the nobody he was, a fraudulent claimant to her emotions."

In his book Dispatches from the wall corner: A journey through Indian cinema, Rangan says that although Haasan is inspired by Marlon Brando, the scene where Haasan burns himself while cooking and vents his anger on Sridevi, is reminiscent of the acting style of Marcel Marceau. In another book of Rangan, Conversations with Mani Ratnam, he states that in the scene where Cheenu enters Bhagyalakshmi's room in the brothel, there was fumbling and embarrassment, whereas in another Haasan film Nayakan (1987), his character, Velu Nayakar, behaves as if he has visited a brothel before. Nayakan's director Mani Ratnam replied that the two scenes are very different from one another and that it "can't be played the same way". Rangan called Moondram Pirai "The apotheosis of [Balu Mahendra's] art".

Nandini Ramnath, writing for the website Scroll.in, noted that Moondram Pirai contains elements common in Balu Mahendra's other films: "realism, evocative and naturalistic cinematography, strong performances, and psychosexual themes that drive the characters to make unusual and often tragic choices." Hari Narayan of The Hindu said Cheenu "looks like a melange of [John] Keats' tragedy and [Sigmund] Freud's psychoanalysis." Narayan explains the idea of Cheenu keeping Bhagyalaskhmi with him not only as an act of sympathy and love, but also with the intention to preserve her like a portrait. Narayan also states that when Bhagyalakshmi recovers her memory and forgets him, Cheenu is hesitant to come back to his quiet existence, realising that in reality, dreams feel like its antithesis. Malathi Rangarajan of The Hindu considers the usage of a railway station in the climax scene to reflect the Tamil cinema trope of "Turning points, crucial interludes and significant twists" taking place in such places. According to S. Shiva Kumar of The Hindu, the climax of the film was a clear allusion to Mahendra's then wife Shoba's death. Thyagarajan denied this, saying Mahendra narrated the story to him much before, and Shoba's death occurred only once the project was being finalised.

== Music ==
The music of the film was composed by Ilaiyaraaja. The soundtrack was released through the record label Agi Music. The number "Kannae Kalaimane", which is based on the Kapi raga, was written by Kannadasan in "about two minutes" time, after listening to the film's story and the situation for the song. According to his daughter Kalaiselvi, the song was written with his wife in mind. Kannadasan was present at the recording session of the song, which took place in September 1981. It was the last recorded song which Kannadasan wrote before his death in October 1981. "Poongatru" was based on the Sindhu Bhairavi raga.

== Release ==
Do you know that Moondram Pirai got an 'A' certificate? ... So, even if I make a very simple film, chances are I might end up with an 'A' certificate. These 'A's and 'U's mean a damn to me. I make a film and that is it. I cannot talk about other filmmakers, but this rule doesn't stop me. If I want to make a film on a subject I have thought of, I will do it. Whether it gets an 'A' or a 'U', I'm least bothered. I'm not interested in its rating. I have my own code of conduct and I stick to that.

— Balu Mahendra on the certification of his film, in January 2014

Moondram Pirai was given an "A" (adults only) certificate by the Central Board of Film Certification. According to Anand Mathew of The Quint, this was done so because of Smitha who "saunters into the film now and then striking Khajuraho inspired poses with Kamal."

When the film was screened to distributors at AVM Mena Hall, they were not happy about the film; however one distributor remarked that the film affected him emotionally, giving confidence to the filmmakers. The film was released on 19 February 1982, in 45 theatres in the state of Tamil Nadu. Due to Haasan's popularity, the crowd came in during the first day of the release; however since it was "a slow-moving film", business on the second day was "only OK. The third day was better. Monday was also just OK". The later picked up due to positive word-of-mouth, it became a "silver jubilee hit in many centres" and ran for more than a year in Subam theatre in Madras. According to Sathya Jyothi Films, Moondram Pirai received its highest distributor share in Madras and Coimbatore. The film was also screened at FILCA, a film festival held at Thiruvananthapuram in September 2014.

Moondram Pirai was dubbed into Telugu under the title Vasantha Kokila. The film was remade in Hindi as Sadma (1983), with Mahendra again directing while Haasan, Sridevi and Smitha reprised their roles.

=== Critical reception ===
Moondram Pirai received critical acclaim. Ananda Vikatan, in its original review of the film, dated 7 March 1982, praised the performances of Haasan and Sridevi, Ilaiyaraaja's background score and songs and the photography by Balu Mahendra, and gave the film 53 marks out of 100. Mid-Day's critic wrote that in Moondram Pirai, Mahendra "does not narrate a story in the traditional sense of the term. What embellish the film are not incidents or characters as they are commonly understood. He presents a whole fascinating array of vignetes and couches them in such endearing cinematic terms that it turns out to be a significant achievement not only for himself but also for the ethos he represents."

Kalki appreciated Moondram Pirai as a rare film where the lead actress was able to outshine Haasan in acting. The critic also liked the way the story of the Blue Jackal was incorporated into the screenplay, appreciated Mahendra's cinematography, and concluded that the film was as perfect as a full moon. Saavi praised the acting of Sridevi and gave an impression of the film being completely her film and praised Kamal's acting and his co-operation to let Sridevi shine. The critic also praised Mahendra's cinematography capturing Ooty beautifully. The magazine Aside gave a less favourable review, calling the film "a neon moon" and said, "There was at one time a brooding, premonitory quality about Balu Mahendra's movies ... but (he) has now gone into the trade of picture postcards and pani puri." After a brief word of praise for Haasan's performance in the climax ("darkly luminescent, like a rain drenched monsoon night") the reviewer added, "Kamal makes a very amusing monkey, but should he not rather be playing a human character?"

=== Accolades ===
According to Thyagarajan, Sridevi was a strong contender for the National Film Award for Best Actress, but lost to Shabana Azmi because of politics: "The makers of Arth had lobbied for Shabana Azmi to make her win. By the time we got to know this, it was too late".

Award	Ceremony	Category	Recipient(s)	Ref.
National Film Awards	30th National Film Awards	Best Actor	Kamal Haasan	
National Film Awards	30th National Film Awards	Best Cinematography	Balu Mahendra	
Filmfare Awards South	30th Filmfare Awards South	Best Director – Tamil	Balu Mahendra	
Tamil Nadu State Film Awards	Tamil Nadu State Film Awards – 1982	Best Film (third prize)	Moondram Pirai	
Tamil Nadu State Film Awards	Tamil Nadu State Film Awards – 1982	Best Actor	Kamal Haasan	
Tamil Nadu State Film Awards	Tamil Nadu State Film Awards – 1982	Best Actress	Sridevi	
Tamil Nadu State Film Awards	Tamil Nadu State Film Awards – 1982	Best Male Playback Singer	K. J. Yesudas	
Tamil Nadu State Film Awards	Tamil Nadu State Film Awards – 1982	Best Female Playback Singer	S. Janaki	

== Legacy ==
The climax scene of the film became popular and was referred to and parodied by many films.

Moondram Pirai attained cult status in Tamil cinema for its "unique amalgamation of high emotional quotient and film-making style". The climax scene where Haasan's character, Cheenu, runs after Sridevi's character, Bhagyalakshmi, who has recovered her memory but forgets the incidents that occur between her accident and recovery completely, and Cheenu trying desperately to make Bhagyalakshmi remember the time she spent with him, to no effect, became popular and was parodied many times. The dialogue told by Smitha's character to Cheenu, "You haave a verrry strrong physique, you know", also attained popularity. A. P. Thiruvadi, in his obituary of Balu Mahendra, called him "The Moondram Pirai of Indian cinema". When S. Shiva Kumar of The Hindu suggested to Balu Mahendra that the film's ending lacked logic, Mahendra said, "Believe me there's no logic in life."

In November 2004, critics compared the plot of the Kannada film Nalla to Moondram Pirai. In March 2005, Sneha, in an interview with Rediff, listed Moondram Pirai among her favourite films. In July 2007, S. R. Ashok Kumar of The Hindu asked eight Tamil film directors to list their all-time favourite Tamil films; two of them – Mani Ratnam and Ameer – named Moondram Pirai. In September 2009, singer Harini, in an interview with The Hindu, said that her favourite song is "Kanne Kalaimane". In February 2010, director R. Balki, in an interview with Forbes India, called Moondram Pirai as his favourite film. In February 2015, Moondram Pirai topped Indumathy Sukanya of The New Indian Express' list of "Top 5 Tamil Romances". Baradwaj Rangan opined that the film was "a superb example of how the presence of a commercially viable plot and the participation of commercially viable actors and technicians can result in art."

In July 2011, Janani Iyer said she considered a role like Sridevi's character, Bhagyalakshmi, as "really challenging." In March 2013, S. Shiva Kumar of The Hindu compared the climax of Sethu (1999) to the climax in Moondram Pirai. In November 2013, S. Saraswathi of Rediff included Moondram Pirai in her list of the "10 best Films of Kamal Haasan". In February 2014, Arundhati said she "would love to play a role like Sridevi's in Moondram Pirai". Sridevi's performance in the film was included in The Times of India's 2015 list, "Sridevi: 5 times the actress bowled us with her performance". Although no print of Moondram Pirai has survived, the film is still available on home video. Balki mentioned in an April 2016 interview with Indo-Asian News Service, that Moondram Pirai "tremendously influenced" him as a filmmaker. Writer V. Vijayendra Prasad stated that he got the idea to write the story of the Telugu film Simhadri (2003) while watching Moondram Pirai.

== In popular culture ==
Balu Mahendra's Telugu film Nireekshana (1982) was dubbed and released in Tamil as Kanne Kalaimane. In Manadhai Thirudivittai (2001), Valayapathi (Vivek) pretends to have lost both his hands. His lover then promises to take care of him. The song "Kanne Kalaimane" is heard as the background music for the scene. In a comedy scene from Run (2002), Mohan (Vivek) imitates Haasan's mannerisms from the climax scene in Moondram Pirai to make his friend Shiva (R. Madhavan) recognise him but fails.

Mahendra described his 2003 directorial venture Julie Ganapathi as an inverse of Moondram Pirai as it was about "a mad woman who has a normal man in her house". Malathi Rangarajan, in her review of Deiva Thirumagal (2011) said, "Probably because the scene of action is Ooty, the main character is mentally challenged, and the story-telling sequence with Vikram and the kid is familiar, at times [Deiva Thirumagal] reminds you of Balu Mahendra's inimitable Moondraam Pirai." Baradwaj Rangan compares a scene in Barfi! (2012), where Barfi (Ranbir Kapoor) goes after Shruti (Ileana D'Cruz) and stumbles, to that of Moondram Pirai's climax scene.

In the 2023 film Leo, when the main character, Parthiban, adopts a spotted hyena, he names it “Subramani” a homage to the dog that Sridevi's character holds in the film.

== Bibliography ==
- Dhananjayan, G. (2014). Pride of Tamil Cinema: 1931–2013. Blue Ocean Publishers. OCLC 898765509.
- Lakshmi, C. S. (2004). The Unhurried City: Writings on Chennai. India: Penguin Books. ISBN 978-0-14-303026-3.
- Rajadhyaksha, Ashish; Willemen, Paul (1998) [1994]. Encyclopaedia of Indian Cinema. British Film Institute and Oxford University Press. ISBN 0-19-563579-5.
- Rangan, Baradwaj (2012). Conversations with Mani Ratnam. India: Penguin Books. ISBN 978-0-670-08520-0.
- Rangan, Baradwaj (2014). Dispatches from the Wall Corner : A Journey through Indian Cinema. Tranquebar Press, Westland Ltd. ISBN 978-9384030568.
