= 31st Filmfare Awards =

1984 awards for Hindi cinema

- Date: 1984

Highlights
- Best Film: Ardh Satya
- Critics Award for Best Film: Masoom
- Most awards: Ardh Satya & Masoom (5)
- Most nominations: Betaab & Masoom (8)

The 31st Filmfare Awards were held in 1984, with the Indian New Wave Cinema at its peak.

Betaab and Masoom led this edition of the award in terms of nomination, with 8 each, followed by Arth with 7 nominations and Ardh Satya with 6.

Ardh Satya and Masoom, both notable films of the Parallel Cinema genre, won 5 awards each, thus becoming the most-awarded films at the ceremony, with the former winning Best Film, Best Director (for Govind Nihalani) and Best Supporting Actor (for Sadashiv Amrapurkar), and the latter winning Best Actor (for Naseeruddin Shah).

Shabana Azmi set an unmatched record, becoming the only performer to receive 4 nominations for an award in a single year, earning 4 nominations for Best Actress for her performances in Arth, Avtaar, Mandi and Masoom, winning the award for Arth.

Naseeruddin Shah received dual nominations for Best Supporting Actor for his performances in Katha and Mandi, but lost to Sadashiv Amrapurkar who won the award for Ardh Satya.

== Main awards ==
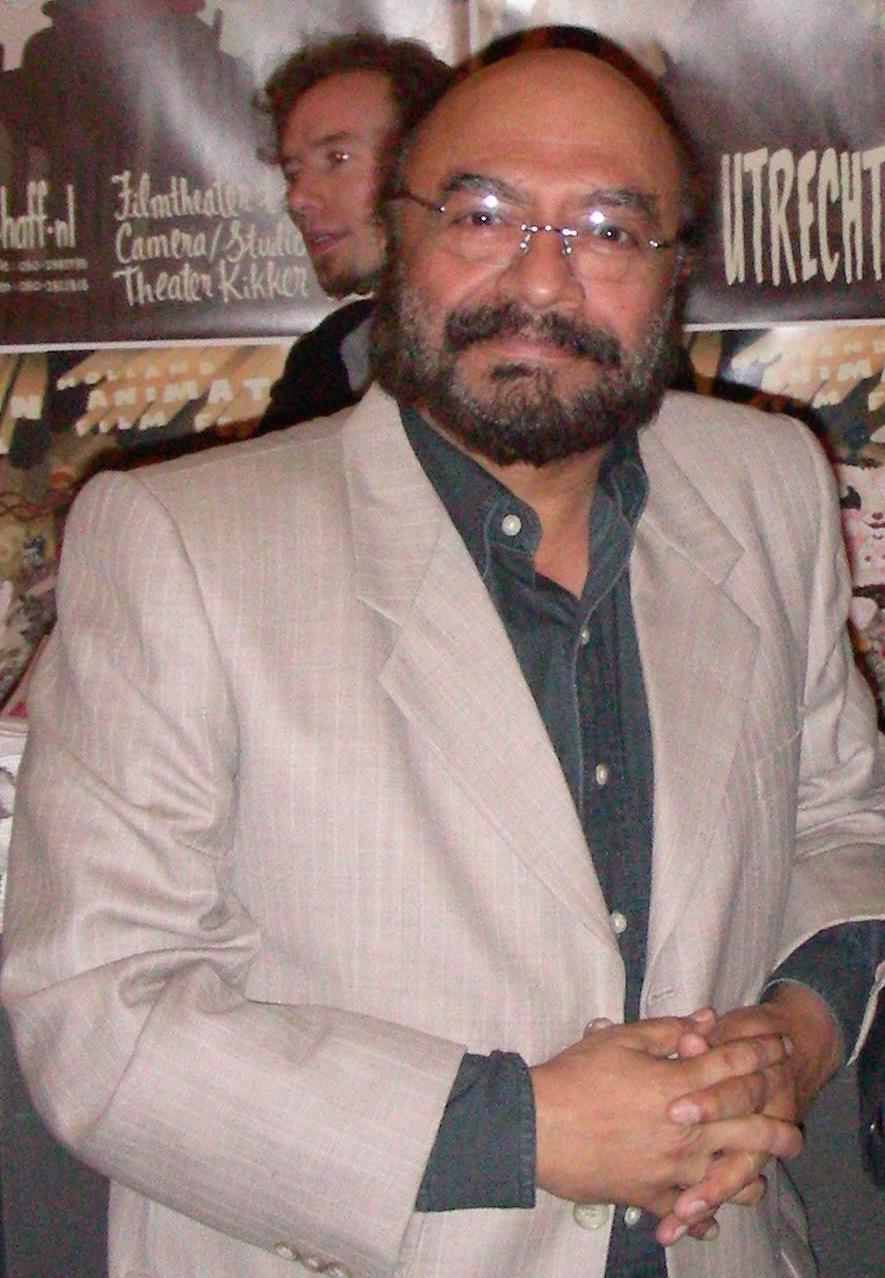
Govind Nihalani — Best Director winner for Ardh Satya

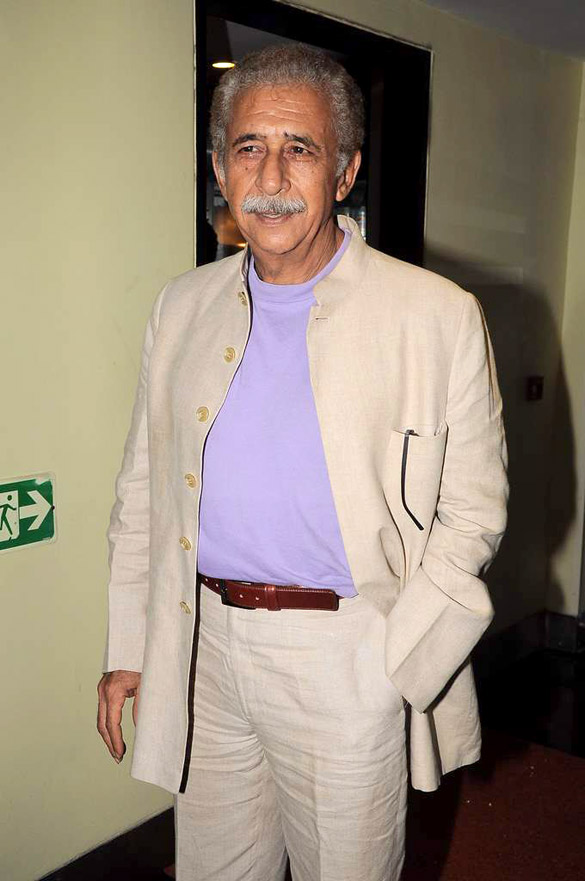
Naseeruddin Shah — Best Actor winner for Masoom

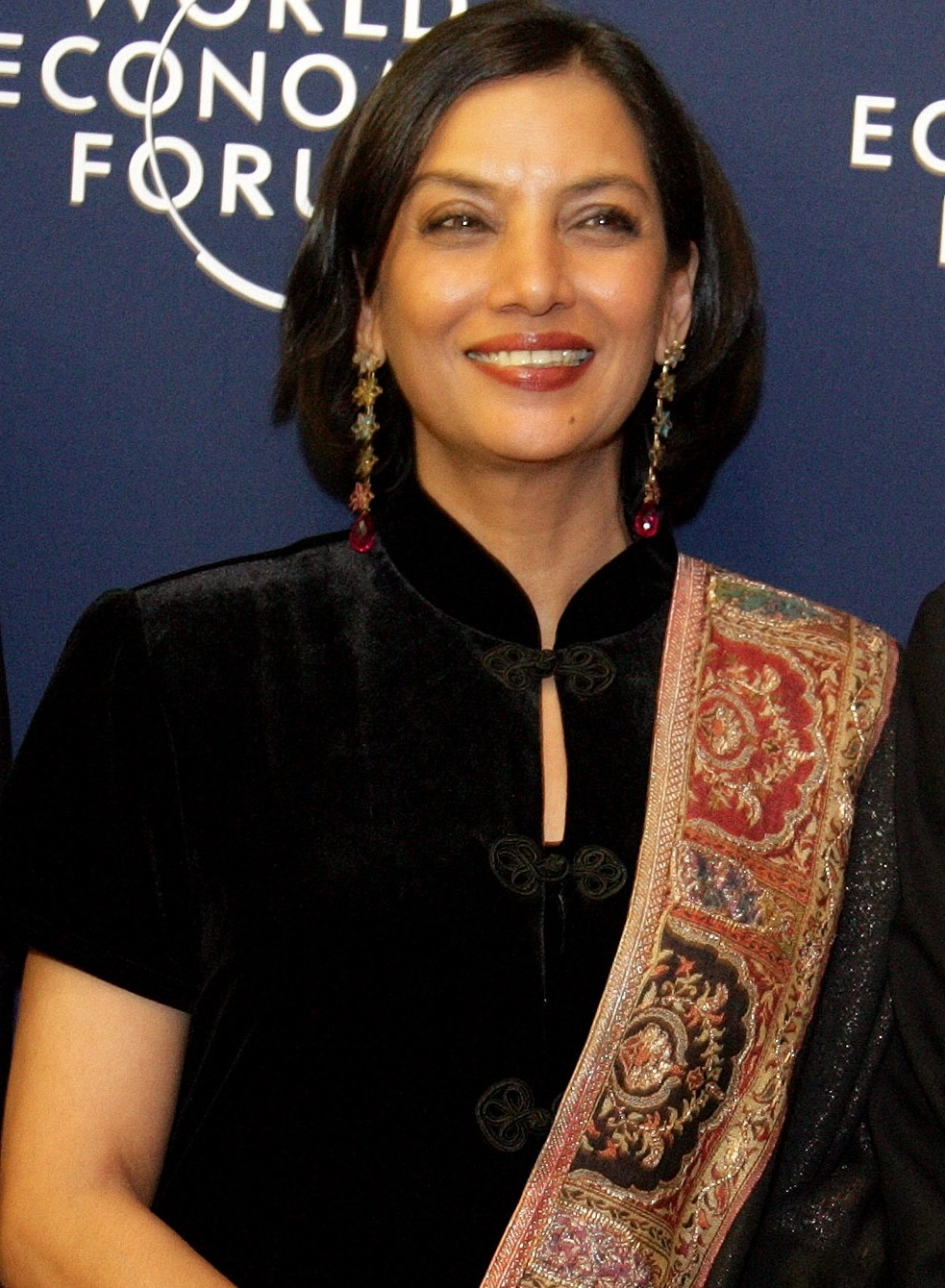
Shabana Azmi — Best Actress winner for Arth

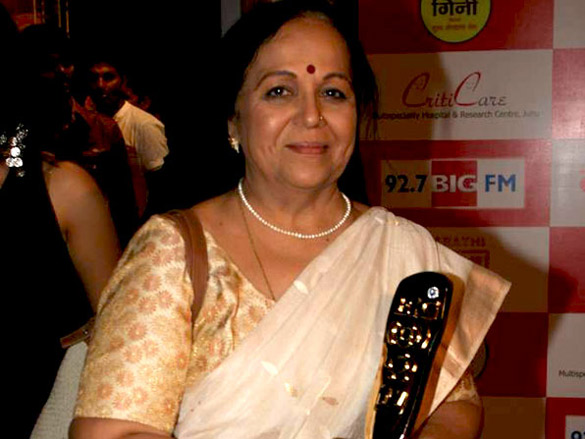
Rohini Hattangadi — Best Supporting Actress winner for Arth

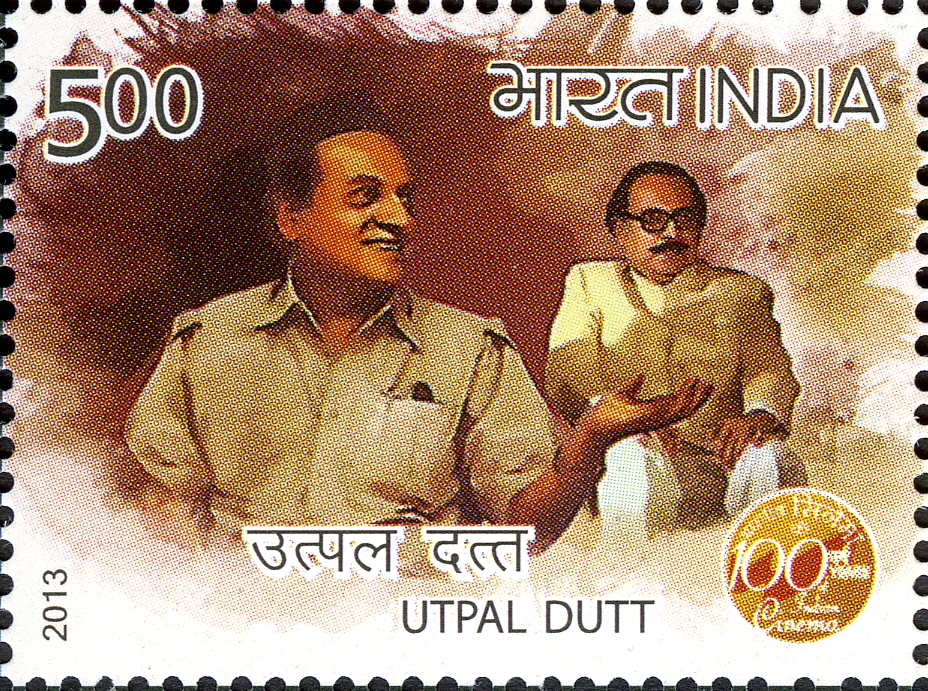
Utpal Dutt — Best Comedian winner for Rang Birangi

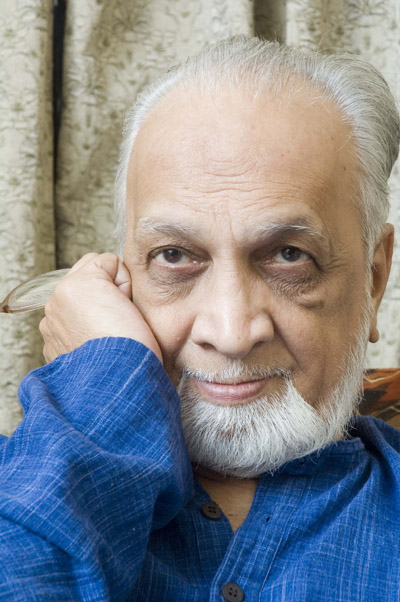
Vijay Tendulkar — Best Screenplay winner for Ardh Satya

=== Best Film ===
Ardh Satya

- Arth
- Avtaar
- Betaab
- Masoom

=== Best Director ===
Govind Nihalani – Ardh Satya

- Mahesh Bhatt – Arth
- Mohan Kumar – Avtaar
- Rahul Rawail – Betaab
- Shekhar Kapoor – Masoom

=== Best Actor ===
Naseeruddin Shah – Masoom

- Kamal Haasan – Sadma
- Om Puri – Ardh Satya
- Rajesh Khanna – Avtaar
- Sunny Deol – Betaab

=== Best Actress ===
Shabana Azmi – Arth

- Shabana Azmi – Avtaar
- Shabana Azmi – Mandi
- Shabana Azmi – Masoom
- Sridevi – Sadma

=== Best Supporting Actor ===
Sadashiv Amrapurkar – Ardh Satya

- Amitabh Bachchan – Andha Kanoon
- Naseeruddin Shah – Katha
- Naseeruddin Shah – Mandi
- Raj Babbar – Agar Tum Na Hote

=== Best Supporting Actress ===
Rohini Hattangadi – Arth

- Padmini Kolhapure – Souten
- Rekha – Mujhe Insaaf Chahiye
- Smita Patil – Arth
- Smita Patil – Mandi

=== Best Comic Actor ===
Utpal Dutt – Rang Birangi

- Deven Verma – Rang Birangi
- Dharmendra – Naukar Biwi Ka
- Kader Khan – Himmatwala
- Shakti Kapoor – Mawaali

=== Best Story ===
Ardh Satya – S.D. Panwalkar

- Arth – Mahesh Bhatt
- Avtaar – Mohan Kumar
- Betaab – Javed Akhtar
- Sadma – Balu Mahendra

=== Best Screenplay ===
Ardh Satya – Vijay Tendulkar

=== Best Dialogue ===
Arth – Mahesh Bhatt

=== Best Music Director ===
Masoom – R.D. Burman

- Betaab – R.D. Burman
- Hero – Laxmikant–Pyarelal
- Razia Sultan – Khayyam
- Souten – Usha Khanna

=== Best Lyricist ===
Masoom – Gulzar for Tujhse Naraaz Nahin

- Agar Tum Na Hote – Gulshan Bawra for Agar Tum Na Hote
- Betaab – Anand Bakshi for Jab Hum Jawaan Honge
- Souten – Saawan Kumar for Shayad Meri Shaadi Ka Khayal
- Souten – Saawan Kumar for Zindagi Pyaar Ka Geet

=== Best Playback Singer, Male ===
Agar Tum Na Hote – Kishore Kumar for Agar Tum Na Hote

- Betaab – Shabbir Kumar for Jab Hum Jawaan Honge
- Betaab – Shabbir Kumar for Parbaton Se Aaj
- Ek Jaan Hain Hum – Shabbir Kumar for Yaad Teri Aayegi
- Souten – Kishore Kumar for Shayad Meri Shaadi Ka Khayal

=== Best Playback Singer, Female ===
Masoom – Aarti Mukherjee for Do Naina Ek Kahani

- Hero – Anuradha Paudwal for Tu Mera Hero Hai
- Laal Chunariya – Chandrani Mukherjee for Aaja Ke Teri Raahon Mein

=== Best Art Direction ===
Razia Sultan

=== Best Cinematography ===
Vijeta

=== Best Sound ===
Vijeta

=== Best Editing ===
Vijeta

== Critics' awards ==
=== Best Film ===
Masoom

=== Best Documentary ===
Veer Savarkar

== Most Wins ==
- Ardh Satya – 5/6
- Masoom – 5/8
- Vijeta – 3/3
- Arth – 3/7
- Betaab – 0/8

== See also ==
- 55th Filmfare Awards
- Filmfare Awards
