= Ab Kya Hoga =

- Directed by: Saawan Kumar Tak
- Produced by: Saawan Kumar Tak
- Starring: Shatrughan Sinha; Neetu Singh; Asrani
- Music by: Usha Khanna
- Release date: 24 March 1977
- Country: India
- Language: Hindi

Ab Kya Hoga (transl. What will happen now) is a supernatural-thriller 1977 Hindi movie, produced, directed and written by Sawan Kumar Tak. The film stars Shatrughan Sinha, Neetu Singh, Asrani, Bindu, Moushumi Chatterjee (cameo) and Ranjeet. The film's music is by Tak's wife Usha Khanna.

It was a rare movie of olden times where actor Ranjeet played a non-villain role, whereas noted comedy actor Asrani played a negative role who plans the hero's death. Most of the past is copied from the 1964 Raj Khosla movie Woh Kaun Thi?.

== Plot ==
The story revolves around Ram Sinha, who meets a girl named Chitralekha while on a train journey. She disappears suddenly from a moving train and thereafter he meets her on various occasions, in circumstances that make him believe that she is a spirit or a ghost. He then discovers that his mother has fixed his marriage with the same girl, and though he goes through with the ceremony, he refuses to accept her as his wife. Chitralekha's ghost/spirit leads him to various life-threatening situations, from which he escapes. Eventually, Ram is killed in a jeep accident, after which it is revealed that his best friend Rajesh had conspired behind his back to cheat him of his wealth. The ghost was a well tutored accomplice who wore a mask that made her look like his betrothed and poisoned Ram's mind against her. The final denouement comes when Ram reappears and reveals that he had faked his death with the help of the Police and his doctor, so as to bring the culprits to the book.

== Cast ==
- Shatrughan Sinha as Ram Sinha
- Neetu Singh as Chitralekha

• Asrani as Rajesh

- Moushumi Chatterjee (Cameo)
- Vinod Mehra (Special appearance)
- Bindu as Anarkali / Kamini
- Pinchoo Kapoor as Mr Dindayal Bhargav
- Chand Usmani as Ranjana, Rajesh's mother
- Indrani Mukherjee as Seeta, Raj's mother
- Mahavir Shah as Driver Arvind Nath Gupta
- Shahnaz Vahanvaty as Ananya
- Jankidas as Chakradhari
- Ranjeet as Dr Prem Mehra
- Mac Mohan as Jagmohan

== Soundtrack ==
Song	Singer
"Sar-E-Mehfil Mera Imaan, Be-imaan Ho Gaya"	Mohammed Rafi, Asha Bhosle
"Aa Devta Tu"	Asha Bhosle
"Teri Dulhan Hoon"	Asha Bhosle
"Soone Se Jeevan Ke"	Asha Bhosle
"Main Raat Bhar Na Soyi"	Asha Bhosle
