= Souten Ki Beti =

- Theatrical release poster
- Directed by: Saawan Kumar Tak
- Written by: Kameshwar (dialogues)
- Screenplay by: Bharat B. Bhalla
- Story by: Saawan Kumar Tak
- Produced by: Saawan Kumar Tak
- Starring: Jeetendra; Rekha; Jaya Prada
- Cinematography: Manmohan Singh
- Edited by: Vanktesh Naik
- Music by: Vedpal
- Production company: Saawan Kumar Productions
- Release date: 5 January 1990
- Running time: 131 minutes
- Country: India
- Language: Hindi

Souten Ki Beti (transl. second Wife's Daughter) is a 1990 Indian Hindi-language drama film, produced and directed by Saawan Kumar Tak. It stars Jeetendra, Rekha, Jaya Prada with music composed by Vedpal. It was the only Indian film of Pakistani actor Talat Hussain.

== Plot ==
Heart specialist Dr. Shyam Verma is the only son of widower Shankar. Shyam woos a beautiful air hostess, Radha. One fine day Shyam and Radha get intimate under the influence of alcohol and Radha gets pregnant. Circumstances force Shyam to marry his father's friend Jagannath's daughter, Rukmini. A heartbroken Radha quits her job and relocates to Kashmir where she gives birth to Dipinti.

A few years later Shyam and Radha meet again. When Rukmini finds out about their previous affair she gets them to reconcile and marry. When Dipinti turns 16 years, she falls in love with a rich lad Amit Mehra. Amit's dad, Advocate Mehra, refuses to allow his 20-year-old son to marry a girl born out of wedlock.

Dr. Shyam gets Dipinti engaged to Advocate Narendra's son Raja. At the engagement party Dipinti faints. Shyam finds out that she is pregnant. Shyam and Rukmini get Dipinti and Amit married. Advocate Mehra lodges a case against all of them for performing the marriage of the underage couple. Before the final decision of court, Radha convinces Mehra to take his complaint back and promises to leave town with Dipint. When they are about to leave home a dying Rukmini stops them. Per her last wish Shyam officially marries Radha in public. Mehra accepts Dipinti as his daughter-in-law.

== Cast ==
- Jeetendra as Dr. Shyam Verma
- Rekha as Radha
- Jaya Prada as Rukmini
- Deepinti as Dipinti
- Sumeet Saigal as Amit Mehra
- Vijayendra Ghatge as Advocate Narendra
- Talat Hussain as Advocate Mehra

== Production ==
Saawan Kumar Tak planned the film as an extension to his previous blockbuster Souten (1983). He initially signed his lead pair from that film – Rajesh Khanna and Tina Munim – for Souten Ki Beti. However, shortly before production began, the actors ended their relationship. Therefore, Saawan Kumar opted for a new cast.

== Soundtrack ==
The songs were written by Saawan Kumar Tak himself and the music was composed by Vedpaal.

| Song | Singer |
|---|---|
| "Yeh Jo Halka Halka Suroor Hai, Sab Teri Nazar Ka Kasoor Hai" | Kishore Kumar, Anuradha Paudwal |
| "Barah Maheene Line Maari, Phir Bhi Laga Na Number" | Kishore Kumar, Meghna |
| "Kaun Sunega Kisko Sunaaye" | Kishore Kumar |
| "Hum Bhool Gaye Re Har Baat" | Lata Mangeshkar |
| "Kahan The Aap" | Lata Mangeshkar |
| "Likh Diya Hai Yeh" | Anuradha Paudwal |
| "Main To Bas Patni Hoon Unki, Tu Saajan Ka Pyar Hai" | Sadhana Sargam, Anuradha Paudwal |
