= KXT (disambiguation) =

KXT may refer to:

- KKXT, a public radio music station in Dallas
- Ketti railway station, the station code KXT
- kxt, the ISO 639-3 code for Koiwat language
- Kaiyuan West railway station, the telegraph code KXT
