= Oru Kochukatha Aarum Parayatha Katha =

- Directed by: P. G. Vishwambharan
- Written by: Thoppil Bhasi
- Screenplay by: Thoppil Bhasi
- Produced by: Jessy Prakash
- Starring: Mammootty; Thilakan; Nedumudi Venu; Saritha
- Cinematography: Ramachandra Babu
- Edited by: G. Venkittaraman
- Music by: A. T. Ummer
- Production company: Santhosh Films
- Distributed by: Santhosh Films
- Release date: 2 March 1984
- Country: India
- Language: Malayalam

Oru Kochukatha Aarum Parayatha Katha (lit. 'A small story that no one has told') is a 1984 Indian Malayalam-language film, directed by P. G. Vishwambharan and produced by Jessy Prakash. The film stars Mammootty, Thilakan, Nedumudi Venu and Saritha in the lead roles. The film has musical score by A. T. Ummer. It is the remake of the 1978 Hindi film Saajan Bina Suhagan, also remade into Tamil as Mangala Nayagi in 1980. This movie marks the debut of Meena (actress) in Malayalam as a child artist.

== Plot ==
Aravindan is an assistant manager in a tea plantation in Munnar. He lives with his wife Janu and three daughters. They follow a happy life until he discovers that he has lung cancer. The doctor suggests him to move to Tata Institute for further treatment. He informs Mammukka about the same and leaves for Bombay lying to his family that he has been promoted as a manager. Meanwhile, Dr. Surendran shifts to Munnar as the family's new neighbour. The youngest daughter of the family, Rajani acquaints with him and introduces him to her mother. The flashback shows about a romantic relationship between Surendran and Janu where their marriage was fixed. Surendran meets with an accident and becomes impotent. He convinces Janu to leave him and marry someone else. The present life shows how Surendran becomes closer to the family. Rajini suffers from a heart problem and Dr. Surendran becomes a helping hand for the treatment. Aravindan's health worsen in Bombay and he asks Mammukka to inform his wife about his ill health. Aravindan has a helping hand called Shankhu in the hospital. Aravindan dies in the presence of Janu in the hospital. Shankhu threatens Janu about informing the kids about their father's death which could cause Rajini, the girl with the weak heart to die. Janu comes back to Munnar and pretends that Aravindan is recovering and does not tell her kids about the death. Shankhu visits her now and is again blackmailing for gold and money. As the last resort, he takes away Janu's marital gold chain and threatens to return it only if he is given ten thousand rupees. Surendran, knowing all truth about Janu, comes to her rescue and beats up Shankhu. He surrenders to the police saying that he murdered Shankhu. Hearing the news, Rajini becomes unconscious. The court leaves Surendran on bail to operate on Rajani. After he returns, he is sent out of jail as the police receive a complaint that Surendran is innocent. Janu confesses to the CBI, who is now handling the case, that she had murdered Shankhu. She had done so because Shankhu had tried to rape her and to save herself she did so. Police arrest her, but the court leaves her considering her circumstances of the crime. The movie ends on a happy note.

== Cast ==
- Mammootty as Dr. Surendran
- Saritha as Janu
- Nedumudi Venu as Aravindan
- Thilakan as Mammukka
- Ashokan
- T. G. Ravi
- Baby Meena as Rajani (child artist)

== Soundtrack ==
The music was composed by A. T. Ummer with lyrics by Bichu Thirumala.

No.	Song	Singers	Lyrics	Length (m:ss)
1	"Azhakin Puzhakal"	K. J. Yesudas, K. S. Chithra	Bichu Thirumala	
2	"Kalyaanam Kalyaanam"	K. S. Chithra, Vani Jairam, Krishnachandran	Bichu Thirumala	
3	"Oh Mummy" (Jeevante Soubhaagya)	K. S. Chithra, Chorus	Bichu Thirumala	
