= Saajan Ki Saheli =

- Directed by: Saawan Kumar Tak
- Written by: Saawan Kumar Tak
- Produced by: Saawan Kumar Tak
- Starring: Nutan; Rekha; Rajendra Kumar; Vinod Mehra
- Music by: Usha Khanna
- Release date: 27 November 1980
- Country: India
- Language: Hindi

Saajan Ki Saheli (meaning "Love Interest of The Lover") is a 1980 Indian Hindi-language romantic musical film produced and directed by Saawan Kumar Tak. The film stars Nutan, Rekha, Rajendra Kumar, and Vinod Mehra.

== Plot ==
Kunti gave birth to Munmun, whom she disowns after birth. A kindhearted lady named Champa adopts her and raises her. After many years when Champa is ill and dying, she confesses that she is not the biological mother of Munmun. From this scene, the story of this movie takes a dramatic turn.

== Cast ==
- Nutan as Kunti Kumar
- Rajendra Kumar as Barrister Avinash
- Rekha as Moon Moon
- Vinod Mehra as Anand
- Suresh Oberoi as Suresh Oberoi
- Paintal as Saawan Kumar
- Anil Dhawan as Anil
- Kalpana Iyer as Dancer

== Production ==
The film was made at the peak of Rekha's stardom, which was used for the film's publicity. This coincided with Nutan and Rajendra Kumar's shift to character roles. The film was shot, among other locations, in Mauritius.

== Themes ==
Premarital childbirth was one of the film's main themes. Scholar Veena Singh included Saajan Ki Saheli in her discussion of four films which reflect the radicalization of the Indian family. Singh described the character of Kunti as a woman "who has a materialistic bent of mind" for whom the purpose of marriage is to get "a big car, a bungalow and other luxuries" and concluded, "For Kunti, the life of an Indian woman begins after marriage - an implication that a woman's past is to be cut off, buried and forgotten lest it should hamper and dampen her married life".

== Soundtrack ==
Music of the film was composed by Usha Khanna and songs were written by Majrooh Sultanpuri. According to Mrityunjay Bose from Deccan Herald, it is one of Khanna's memorable soundtracks. The songs performed by Mohammed Rafi were his last collaboration with Khanna. This was also the last film in which Mohammed Rafi sang for Rajendra Kumar.

#	Title	Singer(s)
1	"Boonden Nahi Sitaare Tapke Hain"	Mohammed Rafi
2	"Jiske Liye Sabko Chhoda Usi Ne Mere Dil Ko Toda"	Mohammed Rafi, Sulakshana Pandit
3	"Aise Naa The Ham Jaisi Hamaari"	Mohammed Rafi
4	"Marne Ke Baad Hamari Yaad Mein"	Usha Khanna, Suresh Wadkar, Mahendra Kapoor
5	"Nautak Mangta Ke Pau Ser Mangta"	Asha Bhosle

== Reception ==
The film was well-received. Nutan's character was described by Subhash K. Jha as a "slinky, vampish mother". In a retrospective list of Rekha's roles, Rediff.com wrote positively of her performance in a scathing review of the film: "Rekha breaks the monotony of the soap opera-like narrative of Saajan Ki Saheli with her chic appearances as Nutan’s point-proving daughter." Film historian Gautam Chintamani said the film was among director Tak's venture into "women-centric" films. Film critic Ranjan Das Gupta says the film is not considered memorable in Nutan's repertoire.
