= Cherugudi Sukshmapureeswarar Temple =

Shiva temple in Tamil Nadu, India

Sukshmapureeswarar Temple
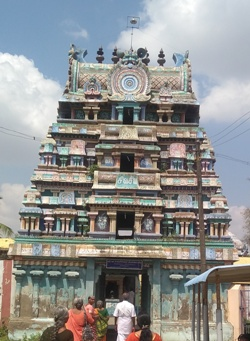

Religion
- Affiliation: Hinduism
- District: Thiruvarur
- Deity: Sukshmapureeswarar (Shiva)

Location
- Location: Thiruchirukudi
- State: Tamil Nadu
- Country: India
- Interactive map of Sukshmapureeswarar Temple
- Coordinates: 10°57′55″N 79°35′13″E

Architecture
- Type: Dravidian architecture

Cherugudi Sukshmapureeswarar Temple (செருகுடி சூட்சுமபுரீசுவரர் கோயில் ])is a Hindu temple located at Cherugudi in Tiruvarur district, Tamil Nadu, India. The presiding deity is Shiva. He is called as Sukshma Pureeswarar. His consort is known as Mangala Nayaki.

== Significance ==
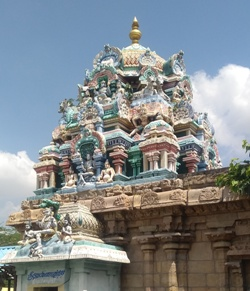
Vimanam

It is one of the shrines of the 275 Paadal Petra Sthalams - Shiva Sthalams glorified in the early medieval Tevaram poems by Tamil Saivite Nayanar Tirugnanasambandar.

== Literary mention ==
Tirugnanasambandar describes the feature of the deity as:

தேனமர் பொழிலணி சிறுகுடி மேவிய

மானமர் கரமுடை யீரே
மானமர் கரமுடை யீருமை வாழ்த்திய

ஞானசம் பந்தன தமிழே.

== Photogallery ==
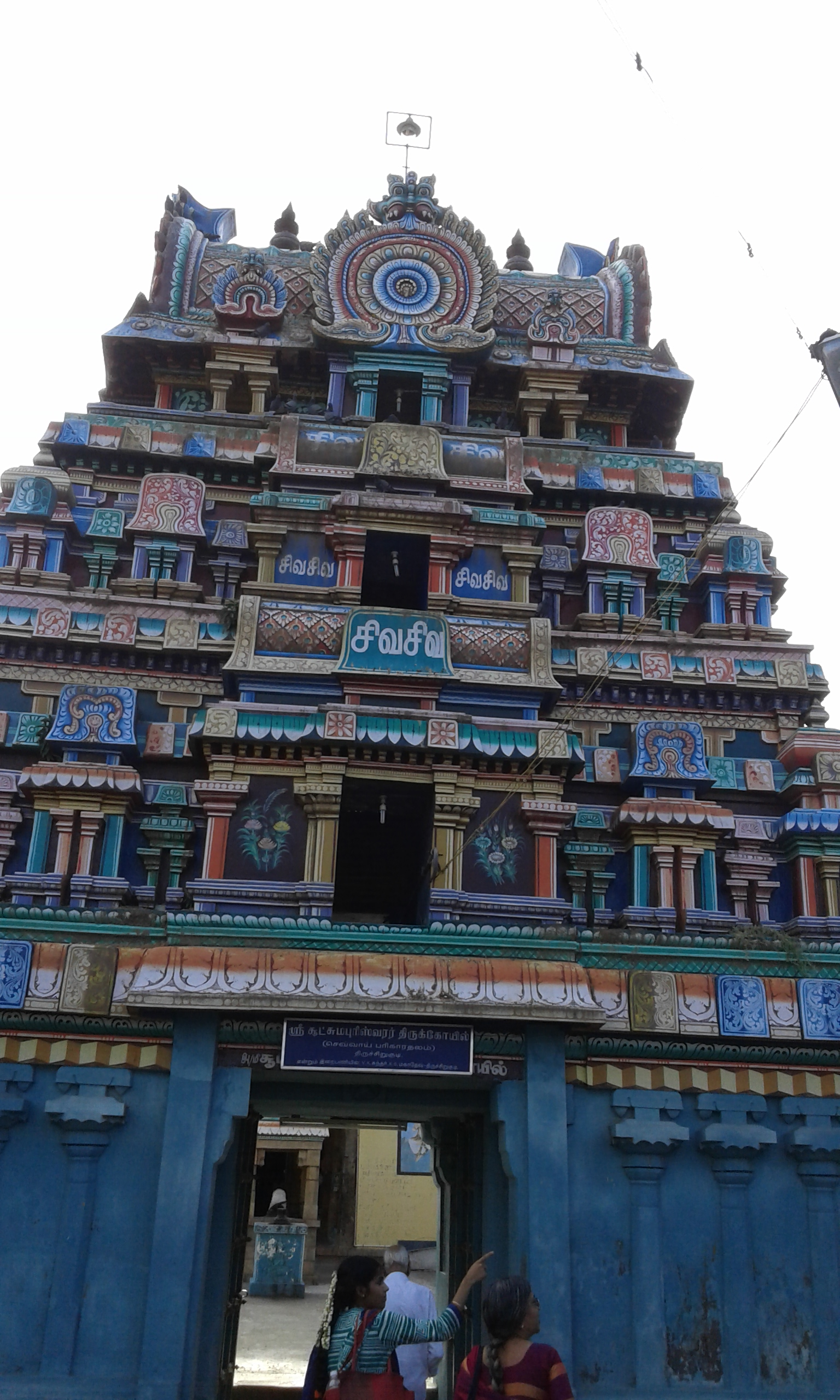
Main gopura

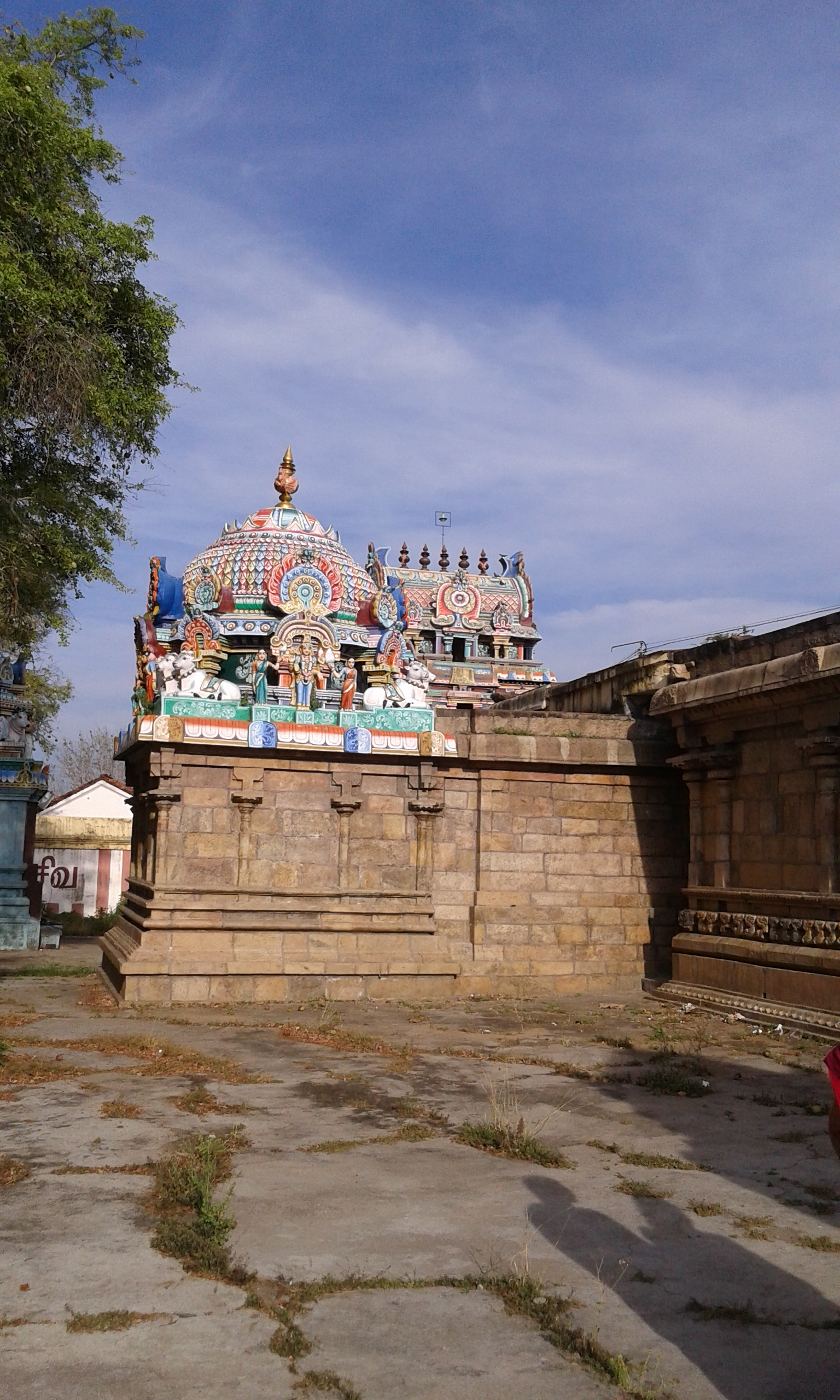
Vimana of the presiding deity

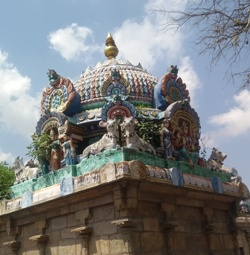
Vimana of the Goddess

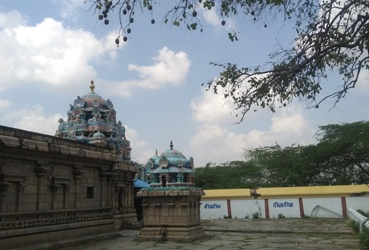
Prakara

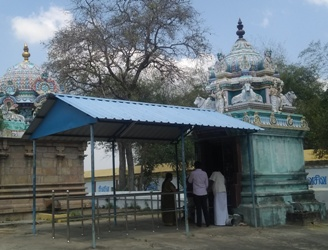
Shrine of Angaraka

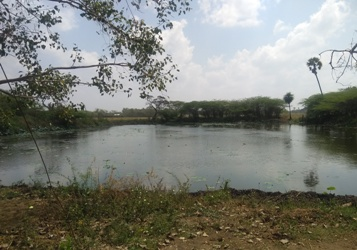
Tank in front of the temple
