= Bewaffa Se Waffa =

1992 Indian film by Saawan Kumar Tak

- Theatrical poster
- Directed by: Saawan Kumar Tak
- Written by: Anwar Khan (dialogues)
- Screenplay by: Sachin Bhowmick
- Story by: Saawan Kumar Tak
- Produced by: Saawan Kumar Tak
- Starring: Vivek Mushran; Juhi Chawla; Nagma
- Cinematography: Harmeet Singh
- Edited by: Jawahar Razdan
- Music by: Usha Khanna
- Production company: Saawan Kumar Productions
- Release date: 4 September 1992
- Country: India
- Language: Hindi

Bewaffa Se Waffa (lit: Loyalty to the disloyal) is a 1992 Hindi film starring Juhi Chawla, Nagma and Vivek Mushran and directed and produced by Saawan Kumar Tak. The film was released on 4 September 1992.

== Plot ==
Aslam marries Rukshar. Their marriage problems start with the discovery of Rukhsar's inability to give birth to a child. Due to this, she asks for help from Nagma and she requests her to marry Aslam for a kid. After the marriage, Nagma's maternal uncle Ajgar Khan and Maternal Aunt conspire, due to which the misunderstandings between Aslam and Rukhsar get widened. Later, after many ups and downs the movie proceeds to an end.

== Cast ==
- Vivek Mushran as Aslam
- Juhi Chawla as Rukshar
- Nagma as Naghma
- Prem Chopra as Ajgar Khan
- Pran as Nawab Jamaluddin Khan
- Mehmood as Khabre
- Aruna Irani as Razia
- Goga Kapoor as Dervesh
- Lalit Tiwari as Altaf Ahmed
- Master Manish as Munna

== Soundtrack ==
Saawan Kumar Tak wrote all the songs.

Song	Singer
"Hum Jaisa Kahin Aapko"	Lata Mangeshkar
"Yeh Dil Bewafa Se Wafa"	Lata Mangeshkar
"Babul Chhodi Na Jaye"	Lata Mangeshkar
"Aa Mere Paas, O Meri Jaan"	Asha Bhosle
"Waise To Zamane Mein"	Asha Bhosle
"Aaya Hoon Badi Door Se"	Vipin Sachdeva
"Hairan Dekhkar Ho"	Vipin Sachdeva
