= Jaani Babu Qawwal =

Indian sufi and qawwali singer

Jaani Babu Qawwal, also known as Jaani Babu, was a legendary Indian sufi and qawwali singer. He was born in 1935 in Hinganghat as Jan Mohammad Jani Babu. He is known for his work on Shankar Shambhu (1976), Mitti (2001) and Market (2003).

He died on 28 January 2008.

== Discography ==
Song	Film / Album	Year	Notes
Mahangayi Maar Gayi	Roti Kapda Aur Makan	1974	With Mukesh, Lata and Narendra Chanchal
Raat Abhi Baaki Hai	Do Khiladi	1976	Composed by Usha Khanna
