= Dil Pardesi Ho Gayaa =

- Directed by: Saawan Kumar Tak
- Screenplay by: Shyam Gupta
- Story by: Saawan Kumar Tak
- Produced by: Saawan Kumar Tak
- Starring: Kapil Jhaveri; Saloni Aswani; Amrish Puri; Ashutosh Rana; Mukesh Rishi; Prem Chopra; Navni Parihar
- Music by: Usha Khanna
- Release date: 12 December 2003
- Running time: 150 min
- Country: India
- Language: Hindi

Dil Pardesi Ho Gayaa (My Heart Became a Stranger) is a 2003 Indian Hindi language romantic drama movie directed by Saawan Kumar Tak.

== Cast ==
- Kapil Jhaveri as Arjun “Sunny” / Salman
- Saloni Aswani as Ruksar Khan, Sarfaroz's daughter.
- Amrish Puri as Brig. Sarfaroz Khan, Ruksar's father.
- Ashutosh Rana as Major Ram
- Mukesh Rishi as Tabrez Baig
- Prem Chopra as Muslim Priest
- Raza Murad as Indian Army Brigadier Gill
- Mushtaq Khan as Khushmisaz
- Yunus Parvez as Ramzan Khan
- Navni Parihar as Niharika Ghatge
- Ghanshyam Rohera as Waiter
- Sanjay Sharma as Capt Nasir Khan

== Plot ==
Major Ram is one of the few soldiers from the Indian Army who have been held captive in Pakistan, following the war with India. The Indian army and politicians are unable to make any decision so as not to jeopardize the lives of the captives. Major Ram's brother, Arjun, alias (Sunny )decides to take it upon himself to enter Pakistan and get his brother free. He now calls himself Salman, working as a waiter. On the way, he meets with beautiful Ruksar and both fall in love with each other while he saves her from a fire. Unfortunately for them, they cannot be married, due to India- Pakistan conflict. The day they are shot, they elope, leading to an unrest within their community. Before that, a hunt is on for them. Salman and Ruksar chance upon the prison camp that is housing Ram, and do get him free, only to find themselves trapped by Pakistani soldiers. Ruksar’s father (Amrish Puri) shoots them, and Salman and Ruksar’s souls are seen walking along a garden in the end credits.

== Soundtrack ==
Dil Pardesi Ho Gayaa (2003) music album contained 9 Songs. All music was composed by Usha Khanna. Lyrics were penned by Saawan Kumaar. Last film of Usha Khanna as a composer.

#	Title	Singer(s)
1	"Dil Pardesi Ho Gaya"	Sonu Nigam, Alka Yagnik
2	"Mubarakaan"	Sunidhi Chauhan
3	"Chamcham Nachoongi"	Udit Narayan, Alka Yagnik
4	"Mubarakaan" (Sad)	Sunidhi Chauhan
5	"Aaj Humne Aapke Liye"	Sudesh Bhosle, S Janaki, Alka Yagnik, KK, Malkit Singh, Chorus, Talat Aziz, Udit Narayan, Anup Jalota, Bombay Jayashri, Ghulam Ali, Amit Kumar, Jolly Mukherjee, Daler Mehndi
6	"Tu Kaun Kahan Se Aayi Hai"	Udit Narayan
7	"O Shaheedon"	Sonu Nigam
8	"Kudrat Ne Baksha"	Udit Narayan, Sunidhi Chauhan
9	"Karachi Nehi Jawangi"	Sunidhi Chauhan
