= Yellanahalli =

- village
- Location in Tamil Nadu, India Yellanahalli (India)
- Coordinates: 11.404457°N 76.712843°E
- Country: India
- State: Tamil Nadu
- District: The Nilgiris

Government
  - Body: Udagamandalam Municipality Corporation
- Elevation: 2,400 m (7,900 ft)

Languages
  - Official: Tamil
- Time zone: UTC+5:30 (IST)
- PIN: 643 243
- Telephone code: 91423
- Vehicle registration: TN 43
- Civic agency: Udagamandalam Municipality Corporation
- Climate: Tropical wet (Köppen)
- Precipitation: 1,237 millimetres (48.7 in)
- Avg. annual temperature: 20 °C (68 °F)
- Temperature from Batchmates.com

Yellanahalli is a small town located in the Nilgiris District of Tamil Nadu State, Southern India and is a Revenue Village of Coonoor taluk. It is 10 km beyond Coonoor and 8 km before Ooty on the Coonoor-Ooty NH 67. It houses the Needle Industries India the manufacturers of the internationally branded ‘Pony Needles’. Near Yellanahalli are another two villages called Ketti and Aruvankadu. The Ketti Valley is located to the south-west of Yellanahalli and is also sometimes referred to as the Switzerland of Southern India due to the year-round climatic conditions which do not fall into any extremes, during summer and winter.
