= Iniyum Kurukshetrum =

Iniyum Kurukshetram
- Directed by: J. Sasikumar
- Screenplay by: S. L. Puram Sadanandan
- Produced by: Joshi Mathew; Achachi
- Starring: Mohanlal; Jagathy Sreekumar; Shobhana; Kaviyoor Ponnamma
- Cinematography: Vipin Das
- Edited by: G. Venkittaraman
- Music by: M. K. Arjunan
- Production company: Sneha Films
- Distributed by: Royal Release
- Release date: 1 March 1986
- Country: India
- Language: Malayalam

Iniyum Kurukshetram (transl. Again Kurukshetra) is a 1986 Indian Malayalam-language action film directed by J. Sasikumar and written by S. L. Puram Sadanandan. The film stars Mohanlal, Jagathy Sreekumar, Shobhana and Kaviyoor Ponnamma. The music for the film was composed by M. K. Arjunan. The film was a blockbuster at the box office.

== Plot ==
Suresh and Jayan are first cousins. Their mothers' brother, a rich man, helped Suresh's mother after her husband died, taking care of all their expenses. Uncle hopes to marry Lekha, his only daughter to one of his nephews, as is the custom among certain Kerala castes. Suresh becomes a cop while Jayan helps in father in his business in Africa. Their rich uncle is sick and keen to get this daughter married off, but he leaves the decision of choosing her groom to Lekha. Lekha is in love with Suresh. Jayan is keen to marry her, but she doesn't like Jayan.

Soon after taking charge of the local police station, Suresh starts receiving anonymous tips about the illegal business of Bal Gangadhar Menon, a local businessman. Suresh raids Gangadhar's business and bust his illegal activities. Gangadhar is his uncles close friend and Gangadhar's arrest in a fake lottery ticket bust, angers uncle. He wants Gangadhar released immediately. Suresh refuses to release Gangadhar.

Suresh meets the anonymous tipster and finds out that he is a college classmate and friend with a lot of cases registered against him. His friend spends his days hiding from the police. Suresh convinces him to surrender himself to the police and the friend surrenders. That night, Suresh's friend is found murdered in the cell and a cop gives false statement that Suresh killed his friend. Suresh is arrested and his uncle bails him out. Suresh leaves the house to find the real killer, and the rest of the story is about is hunt for the real killer and the impediments that Gangadhar puts in his path.

== Cast ==
- Mohanlal as Sub Inspector Suresh
- Jagathy Sreekumar
- Shobhana
- Lissy
- Kaviyoor Ponnamma
- Adoor Bhasi
- Nahas
- C. I. Paul
- K. P. Ummer
- M. G. Soman
- Meena
- Rahman
- Thodupuzha Vasanthi

== Soundtrack ==
The music was composed by M. K. Arjunan and the lyrics was written by K. Jayakumar.

No.	Song	Singers	Lyrics	Length
1	"Ethra Nilaathiri"	K. J. Yesudas	K. Jayakumar	
2	"Marathakakkootil"	K. J. Yesudas, Lathika	K. Jayakumar	

== Release ==
The movie released on 1 March 1986. Distribution rights for the motion picture were acquired by Royal Release.
