= Hawas (1974 film) =

- Poster
- Directed by: Saawan Kumar Tak
- Written by: Saawan Kumar Tak
- Produced by: Saawan Kumar Tak
- Starring: Anil Dhawan; Neetu Singh; Vinod Mehra; Bindu
- Cinematography: Kaka Thakur
- Edited by: Y. G. Chouhan
- Music by: Usha Khanna; Lyrics by Sawan Kumar
- Production company: Mercury Productions
- Release date: 2 August 1974
- Running time: 130 minutes
- Country: India
- Language: Hindi

Hawas (English: Lust) is a 1974 Indian Hindi-language film produced, directed, and written by Sawan Kumar. The film stars Anil Dhawan, Neetu Singh, Bindu, Vinod Mehra with a special appearance by Rekha during the song Aao Yaaron Gao. The film's score was made by Usha Khanna. According to film and music expert Rajesh Subramanian lyricist Majrooh Sultanpuri refused to reduce his price for the film and a humiliated Sawan Kumar Tak while leaving the lyricist's residence instantly penned the lines Teri Galiyon Mein Na Rakhenge Kadam Aaj Ke Baad. The song turned out to be an alltime classic.

== Synopsis ==
The handsome Anil Kumar is employed with Natwarlal, a criminal gangster. Natwarlal asks Anil to find employment with Shailendra Singh, and after doing so, seduce his beautiful young daughter (Neetu) and marry her, to get himself a share in their property and wealth. Anil agrees to do so, and finds employment with Shailendra. Things go topsy turvy when Shailendra's second wife Kamini, is heavily attracted to Anil and wants him for herself.

== Cast ==
- Anil Dhawan as Anil Kumar
- Neetu Singh as Neetu
- Rekha (Special appearance)
- Pradeep Kumar as Shailendra Singh
- Bindu as Kamini
- Vinod Mehra as Dr. Bali
- Vidya Sinha as Vidya Kumar
- Mehmood as Inspector Mehmood
- Faryal
- Pinchoo Kapoor
- Gurcharan Pohli
- Ashok Khanna
- Randhir
- Asit Sen
- Sawan Kumar Tak
- Neelu
- Sharmilee
- Randhawa (hired goon)
- Jugnu as Jugnu
- Brahm Bhardwaj

== Production ==
The song "Aao Yaaron Gao Naacho" was initially planned to feature Faryal as the main dancer, but after Rekha heard the song, asked to feature in it since she liked the tune. The costume that Rekha wears in the song was designed by herself.

== Soundtrack ==
The music was composed by Usha Khanna and lyrics were by Sawan Kumar.

Song	Singer
"Teri Galiyon Mein"	Mohammed Rafi
"Kal Raat Usne"	Asha Bhosle
"Aao Yaaron Gao Naacho"	Asha Bhosle
"Yeh Hawas Kya Hai"	Asha Bhosle
"Apne Dil Mein Jagah"	Asha Bhosle

- The song "Teri Galiyon Men" was listed at #10 on Binaca Geetmala annual list 1974.

== Accolades ==
Rafi received a Film World Magazine Award for best male singer for the song "Teri Galiyon Mein". The film received Filmfare Award nominations for Best Supporting Actress (Bindu) and Best Female Playback Singer (Asha Bhosle) for the song "Yeh Hawas Kya Hai".
