= Moodalmanju =

- Theatrical poster
- Directed by: Sudin Menon
- Written by: Sudin Menon; Parappurathu (dialogues)
- Screenplay by: Sudin Menon
- Produced by: C Vasudevan Nair
- Starring: Prem Nazir; Sheela; Adoor Bhasi; P. J. Antony and Vincent
- Cinematography: C Vasudevan Nair
- Edited by: Devadas
- Music by: Usha Khanna
- Production company: VS Pictures
- Distributed by: VS Pictures
- Release date: 9 January 1970
- Country: India
- Language: Malayalam

Moodalmanju is a 1970 Indian Malayalam film, directed by Sudin Menon and produced by C Vasudevan Nair. The film stars Prem Nazir, Sheela, Adoor Bhasi and P. J. Antony in the lead roles. The film had musical score by Usha Khanna.

== Plot ==
The story revolves around Ravi (Prem Nazir), a kind-hearted and ambitious young man from a modest background. He is deeply in love with Radha (Sheela), a beautiful and virtuous woman from a well-off family. Despite their strong affection for each other, their love faces stiff opposition due to Ravi's lower social status. Radha's family, particularly her strict father, strongly disapproves of their relationship and arranges for her to marry a wealthy suitor instead.

Heartbroken but determined, Ravi moves to the city to rebuild his life. With his intelligence and hard work, he manages to secure a respectable job. Meanwhile, Radha, forced into an unhappy marriage, suffers in silence as she yearns for the love she lost.

In the city, Ravi meets another woman, Malathi (Jayabharathi), who develops feelings for him. However, Ravi remains emotionally tied to Radha, unable to move on. Malathi, understanding his inner turmoil, chooses to support him selflessly, hoping that time will heal his wounds.

Meanwhile, Radha's marriage turns abusive, and she endures immense suffering at the hands of her cruel husband. When Ravi learns about Radha's plight, he is torn between his lingering love for her and his growing responsibilities. The story builds towards an emotional climax, where Ravi must make a difficult decision—whether to reunite with his first love or embrace the present and move forward with Malathi.

The film's title Moodalmanju (which translates to "Frozen Dew") metaphorically represents the fleeting nature of love and happiness, as well as the sacrifices individuals must make in life.

== Cast ==
- Prem Nazir as Rajesh/Raju
- Sheela as Geetha, Usha
- Adoor Bhasi as Lonappan
- P. J. Antony
- Vincent as Prasad
- T. R. Omana as Madhaviyamma
- G. K. Pillai as Chandrasekharan Nair
- Jyothi
- Kaduvakulam Antony as Sankaran Nair
- Kumari Thankam
- Madhubala as Syamala
- P. R. Menon
- Sreekumar
- Narayanan

== Soundtrack ==
All lyrics are written by P. Bhaskaran; all music is composed by Usha Khanna.

No.	Title	Artist(s)	Length
1.	"Kavililenthe Kunkumam"	B. Vasantha
2.	"Maanasamanivenuvil"	S. Janaki
3.	"Mukile"	S. Janaki
4.	"Nee Madhu Pakaro" (Bit)	K. J. Yesudas
5.	"Nee Madhupakaroo"	K. J. Yesudas
6.	"Unaruvegam Nee"	S. Janaki
7.	"Unaruvegam Nee" (Bit)	S. Janaki
