= CSI College of Engineering =

Educational institution in Tamil Nadu, India

Coordinates: 11°22′26″N 76°43′39″E

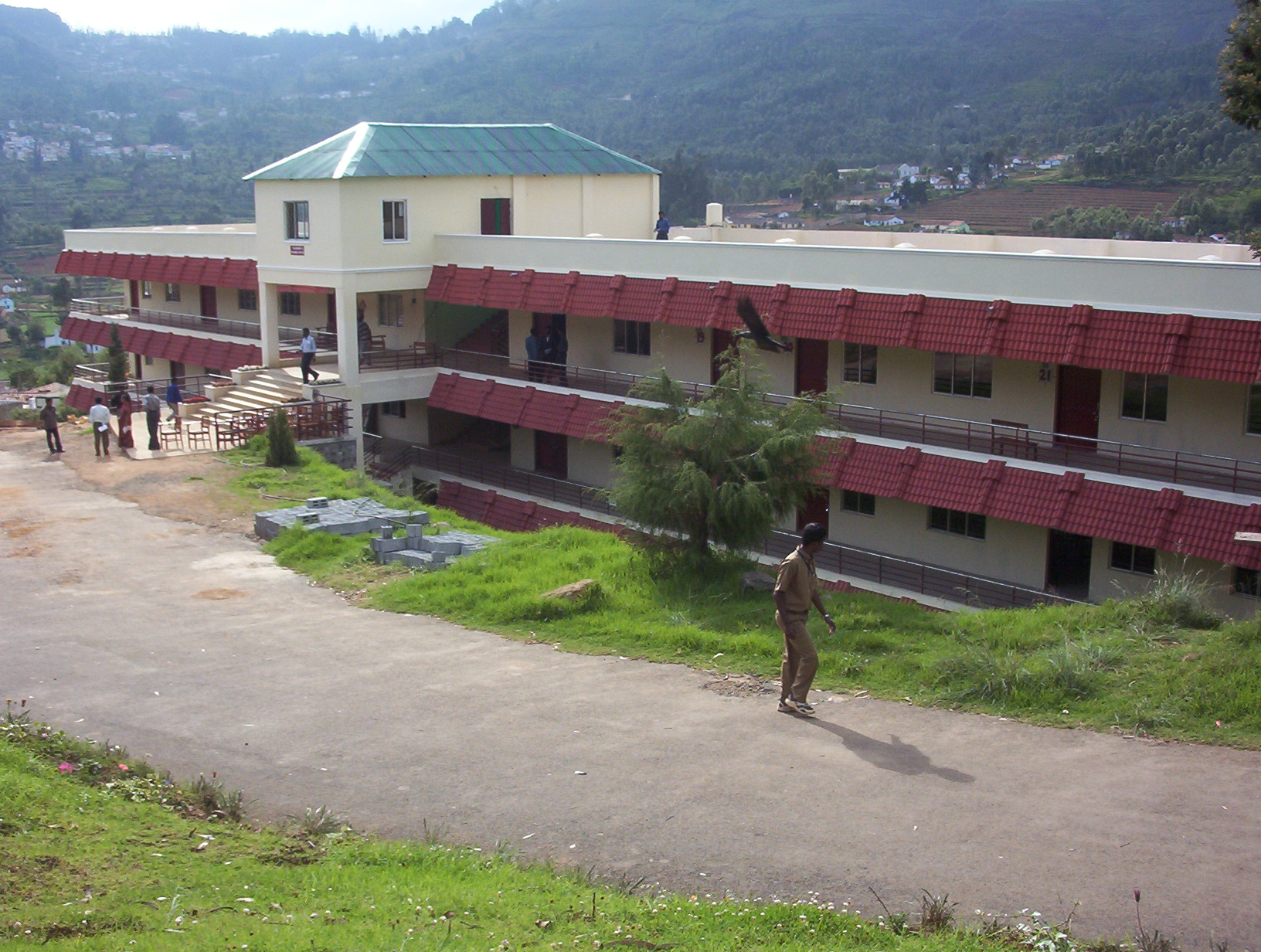
- Mechanical Department block
- Type: Self-financed college
- Established: 1998
- Affiliations: Anna University, Chennai
- Location: Ketti, coonoor, Nilgiris District, Tamil Nadu, India
- Campus: Ooty
- Website: www.csice.edu.in

CSI College of Engineering (CSICE), Nilgiris is a self-financing engineering college situated in the Ketti Valley of Tamil Nadu, India. It was established in 1998. It is a self-financing institution, offering degree level courses in different disciplines of Engineering Sciences.

This is the only Engineering college present in the Nilgiri district. It is working towards the benefit of the economically weaker section people for their growth by offering Engineering degrees at a lower cost compared to other engineering colleges around Tamilnadu.

This college was founded by the Church of South India, Coimbatore Diocesan Council.

The college is approved by AICTE, New Delhi and Government of Tamil Nadu, and is affiliated with Anna University, Chennai.

== Activities ==
- In 2005, a ten-day NSS camp was situated in Nedugalcombai, an Irumba tribal village. The campus involved sanitising, building facilities and structures and conducting cultural engagement events and activities for the tribals.
- The Youth Red Cross wing of the Institution organised a blood donation camp in August 2004, enlisting the aid of the Coimbatore-based K. G. Hospital. Over 200 students and 25 members of the faculty participated.
- Former President of INDIA Dr.A.P.J Abdul Kalam Addressed and interacted with the Students of CSI College of Engineering Ketty, Nilgiris - Ooty, on 21 February 2012. He quoted "I was reading about the college and was happy to know the mission of the college is to equip the students with Technical Knowledge, skill and ability" He also told "Leader must be able to travel into an unexplored path"
- India's first astronaut Wing Commander Rakesh Sharma participated in a function organised by the Department of Computer Science and Engineering to inaugurate its students association Auritz.
- The chairman, ISRO, G. Madhavan Nair, at a space science exhibition organised by CSI College of Engineering at Ketti near Udhagamandalam. he said that from manufacturing pencil rockets in the late 60s the country had come a long way. Pointing out that in space technology, India was self-reliant, he said that since it was well-proven, satellites were being manufactured on a commercial basis for European countries
- Former Chairman, Atomic Energy Commission, M.R. Srinivasan, distributing degree certificates at the CSI College of Engineering in Ketti. With elaborate arrangements having been made for the 10th Graduation Day ceremony, the chief guest M.R. Srinivasan, former chairman, Atomic Energy Commission said that there is no end to learning.
- Christmas Function celebrated during Dec 2013
- The Mechanical Engineering Students association invited Dr.Tessy Thomas, Director Agni Missile, India as the Chief Guest for inaugurating their simposium
- All India NCC Girls Nilgiris Trek 2014 hoisted by CSI College of Engineering
- Got NAAC "B+" accreditation in the 2023

== See also ==
- List of colleges in Ooty
