= Pyar Ki Jeet (1987 film) =

- Directed by: Sawan Kumar Tak
- Produced by: Sawan Kumar Tak
- Starring: Ashok Kumar; Shashi Kapoor; Vinod Mehra; Rekha
- Music by: Usha Khanna
- Release date: 7 August 1987
- Country: India
- Language: Hindi

Pyar Ki Jeet is a 1987 Indian Bollywood film directed and produced by Sawan Kumar Tak. The film stars Ashok Kumar, Shashi Kapoor, Vinod Mehra, Rekha. Moon Moon Sen has made a special appearance here. The music was composed by Usha Khanna. The film was actually ready to release in February 1987, but due to the piracy case and some legal issues, it was finally released on 7 August 1987.

== Plot ==
Soni is a smart and bubbly girl. She returns to her hometown village from the big city where she works as a garment merchant. The village residents regard her as a cheap woman, for her frequent visits to the big city. Only Dr. Rehman, the village doctor understands her circumstances. He takes care of everyone, everything, without charging money and everyone respects him.

Dr. Kumar is a rich and successful doctor in the city. He has educated his son Anand at the best medical academies. Once, when he sends Anand to the village to visit Dr. Rehman, the villagers come to wrongly believe that he is the new assistant doctor. Finding out that Rehman is ill and cannot manage the work alone, Anand decides to stay.

When Soni returns to the village she falls in love with Anand. Anand also falls in love with her but denies his feelings, because of her soiled reputation. Soni pursues him everywhere to win his love but Anand keeps rejecting her. How will he come to accept her love forms the rest of the story.

Landlord wants Soni to pursue relationship with him but Soni rejects him. Landlord was told that soni is in love with Dr. Anand, so landlord sends his henchmen to kill anand, but soni intercepts on the way, and fights away the henchmen which in turn injures soni. Anand later finds out sony saved his life. He tells her even though he tried to put a wall between him and her, her love broke that wall and now he accepts her. Anand was about to ask soni's hand to her calling father Dr. Rehman, but he gets dizzy and finds out he has tumor on his brain. Dr. Rehman suggests he needs to do operation and needs his father Dr. Kumar's help and money. BUt anand now living in village as a village doctor had severed ties with his father so he doesn't want to get well from his father's money. He would rather die with the disease like all the rest of the money less people's fate. So he creates a fight with soni so he can remove attachment. Soni doesn't understand why Anand is treating him so badly, but Dr. Rehman tells her the cause that because he is dying he doesn't want to be burden to her love. Soni goes to landlord and tries to sells her body for 1 lakh for anand's operation. whole villagers intercepts landlord from taking her, Dr. rehman returns the money to the landlord but he shoots him instead. In the mean time Dr. kumar comes with ambulance to treat his son, but saves Dr. Rehman's life in his ambulance by taking the bullets out from his chest. Which also indicates that anands tumor will be also removed similarly. Soni and anand have a big wedding celebration at the end and happily ever after.

== Cast ==
- Ashok Kumar as Dr. Kumar
- Shashi Kapoor as Dr. Rehman
- Vinod Mehra as Dr. Anand
- Rekha as Soni
- Moon Moon Sen as Rani Padmini Devi
- Jagdeep as Nathulal
- Pinchoo Kapoor as Village Sarpanch
- Puneet Issar as Darshan Patel
- Bharat Kapoor as Jagirdar

== Music ==
Lyrics: Sawan Kumar Tak

Song	Singer
"Mujhe Rehna Hai Tere Dil Mein, Kiraya Bol Kya Legi"	Kishore Kumar, Asha Bhosle
"Meri Ek Ada Lakh Lakh Di"	Asha Bhosle
"Ae Dost Tu Be-imaan Hai"	Asha Bhosle
"Aaj Mere Pyar Ki Jeet"	Asha Bhosle
"Mainu Rab Di Saun"	Asha Bhosle
"Dulhe Raja Dekh"	Asha Bhosle
