= Sadma =

1983 film by Balu Mahendra

- Poster
- Directed by: Balu Mahendra
- Screenplay by: Balu Mahendra; Gulzar (dialogue)
- Story by: Balu Mahendra
- Based on: Moondram Pirai by Balu Mahendra
- Produced by: Raj N. Sippy; Romu N. Sippy
- Starring: Sridevi; Kamal Haasan
- Cinematography: Balu Mahendra
- Edited by: D. Vasu
- Music by: Ilaiyaraaja
- Release date: 8 July 1983
- Running time: 141 minutes
- Country: India
- Language: Hindi

Sadma (transl. Trauma) is a 1983 Indian Hindi-language romantic drama film, written and directed by Balu Mahendra. The film stars Sridevi as Nehalata Malhotra, a young woman who regresses to childhood as a result of retrograde amnesia after suffering a head injury in a car crash. She was lost and ended up trapped in a brothel before being rescued by Somu (played by Kamal Haasan), a lonely school teacher who falls in love with her.

Released on 8 July 1983, the film was a remake of Mahendra's 1982 Tamil film Moondram Pirai, which also starred Sridevi and Haasan. Although a commercial failure upon release, Sadma was widely acclaimed by critics for its direction, screenplay, music, and performances. Sridevi's performance as an amnesiac woman was widely praised. Sadma over the years has gained cult status. At the 31st Filmfare Awards, Sadma received three nominations: Best Actor (Kamal Haasan) Best Actress (Sridevi) and Best Story (Mahendra).

== Plot ==
Nehalata, a young woman, has a car accident while returning from a party and is hospitalized with severe head injuries. When she recovers, she is diagnosed with retrograde amnesia. Having mentally regressed to the state of her 6-year-old self, she fails to recognize her elderly parents. While she is undergoing treatment, she is kidnapped and sold to the madam of a brothel. Somprakash, also known as Somu, visits the brothel with his old friend to relax. The madam sends Nehalata, renamed Reshmi, to his room. Somu realises that she is mentally a child and pities her upon learning how she came to the brothel. He questions her about her family and background, but due to her condition, she is unable to reveal enough information for him to locate her parents.

Somu rescues Reshmi from the brothel, under the pretense of a pleasure trip. He takes her to his home in Ooty, where he works as a school teacher. His elderly neighbour, whom he refers to as Grandmother, helps him care for Reshmi. Although Somu is aware of Reshmi's physical beauty, their relationship is strictly that of a child and protective caregiver, and she becomes trusting of him. Their bond is briefly threatened when Reshmi accidentally spills ink over Somu's documents, angering him, but they reconcile. Later, a local woodcutter named Balua lusts for Reshmi and nearly assaults her, but she manages to save herself. When Somu learns of it, he becomes livid with rage and almost kills Balua. In a side plot, Soni, the lonely younger wife of Somu's middle-aged headmaster, repeatedly attempts and fails to seduce Somu, who does not reciprocate her feelings.

Reshmi's father, who was searching for her through the police, releases a newspaper advertisement about her. He is given a lead by a co-passenger of the train that Somu and Reshmi had taken to Ooty. Meanwhile, Somu takes Reshmi to a medicine man and leaves her with him for a day's treatment. The police arrive at Somu's house searching for Reshmi, eventually tracing her to the medicine man's home. Somu, fearing police action, does not follow them there. The treatment is successful, with Reshmi (now Nehalata again) regaining her memory, recognizing her parents, and completely forgetting the period between her accident and recovery. She and her parents rejoice and prepare to leave Ooty. The medicine man informs her father that the man who had brought her to him had been taking good care of his daughter; her father withdraws his police complaint, and the family begins their journey home.

After the police leave, Somu chases the car in which Nehalata is traveling, falling and severely injuring himself in the process. Covered in mud, he limps after them to the railway station and tries to get Reshmi's attention at her train seat window, but she does not remember him. Somu repeatedly calls out to her and mimics a dancing monkey that she had developed a liking for, but Nehalata, unable to comprehend, thinks he is insane and begging for food. He continues his futile attempts, but the train eventually leaves with Nehalata not recognising him. Somu is left alone at the station, heartbroken.

== Cast ==
- Kamal Haasan as Somprakash "Somu"
- Sridevi as Nehalata Malhotra / Reshmi
- Gulshan Grover as Balua
- Silk Smitha as Soni
- Paintal as Paintal
- Arvind Deshpande as J.K. Malhotra
- Ashalata Wabgaonkar as Rajeshwari Malhotra
- Shreeram Lagoo as Dr. Khandeparkar
- Viju Khote as Inspector David
- Birbal as Shyamu
- Leela Mishra as Somu's Neighbour
- Padma Chavan as Brothel Madam

== Soundtrack ==
Sadma

Soundtrack album by Ilaiyaraaja
- Released: 1983
- Genre: Feature film soundtrack
- Length: 28:58
- Language: Hindi
- Label: Sony Music
External audio
- Official Audio Jukebox on YouTube

The music was composed by Ilaiyaraaja, in his Bollywood debut, and the lyrics were penned by Gulzar. Ilaiyaraaja retained two of his compositions from the original Tamil version. The song "Vaanengum Thanga Vinmeengal" was tuned differently for the Hindi version as "Yeh Hawa Yeh Fiza". The song "Narikkathai" was replaced with the song "Ek Dafa Ek Jungle Tha" in the Hindi version. The song "Poongatru Puthithanathu" was replaced with a slightly different "Ae Zindagi Gale Laga Le", which itself was also used in the 1984 Tamil movie Thambikku Entha Ooru sung by SPB. "Ae Zindagi Gale Laga Le" was first remade for the film Prague (2013) by Atif Afzal. It was again remade for the film Dear Zindagi (2016) by Amit Trivedi. Music director A. R. Rahman worked as a keyboard player for this film.

Song	Singer
"O Babua, Yeh Mahua"	Asha Bhosle
"Yeh Hawa, Yey Fiza Deewanon Ke Maikhane Hain"	Asha Bhosle, Suresh Wadkar
"Ae Zindagi Gale Laga Le"	Suresh Wadkar
"Surmayee Ankhiyon Mein" – 1	K. J. Yesudas
"Surmayee Ankhiyon Mein" – 2	K. J. Yesudas
"Ek Dafa Ek Jangal Tha, Us Jangal Mein Ek Gidad Tha"	Kamal Haasan, Sridevi

The song "Surmayee Ankhiyon Mein" is set in raga Pilu.

== Release ==
Sadma was released on 8 July 1983. In 2015, Sadma was screened at the Habitat Film Festival.

== Critical reception ==
Sadma received widespread critical acclaim, with major appreciation drawn towards Sridevi's performance. It is included in iDiva's list of '10 Must Watch Movies That Weren't Blockbusters'. Sridevi's performance as a child-woman suffering from amnesia was called by Subhash K. Jha of The Indian Express, "a milestone in her illustrious career". In 2012, when Barfi! was being promoted, Anurag Basu said "People might feel so because the last film that featured the actress in a mentally challenged role was of Sadma. But the comparisons are only on the basis of the promo...once you see the film upon its release everything would be clear.". That same year, Adil Hussain, Sridevi's co-star in English Vinglish revealed that he became a fan of the actress after watching her in Sadma. The Sridevi-Kamal Haasan pair also appeared on the CNN-IBN list of 'Greatest Romantic Couples on Celluloid'. The climax of Sadma is included in the CNN-IBN list of 'Bollywood's 50 Most Memorable Scenes of All Time'.

== Awards and nominations ==
=== 31st Filmfare Awards ===
Nominated

- Best Actor – Kamal Haasan
- Best Actress – Sridevi
- Best Story – Balu Mahendra
