= Laila (1984 film) =

- Directed by: Saawan Kumar
- Written by: Saawan Kumar
- Starring: Anil Kapoor; Poonam Dhillon; Sunil Dutt; Pran; Anita Raj; Yogeeta Bali
- Music by: Usha Khanna
- Production companies: Film City (Goregaon); Filmalaya Studio; Mehboob Studios
- Release date: 7 September 1984
- Country: India
- Language: Hindi

Laila is a 1984 Indian Hindi movie directed by and with lyrics by Saawan Kumar. The music is by Usha Khanna. The film stars Sunil Dutt, Anil Kapoor, Poonam Dhillon, Pran and Anita Raj.

== Cast ==
- Sunil Dutt as Thakur Prithviraj Singh / Thakur Dharamraj Singh (Double Role)
- Anil Kapoor as Kumar Deshraj Singh
- Poonam Dhillon as Laila
- Anita Raj as Padmini Singh
- Yogeeta Bali as Thakurain Sunaina Singh
- Pran as Bharat Singh
- Pradeep Kumar as Peer Sahib
- Satyendra Kapoor as Ram Singh
- Yunus Parvez as Sarwar Shaikh
- Neena Gupta as Salma
- Jagdish Raj as Thakur
- Ramesh Deo as Chandru
- Seema Deo as Durga
- Jankidas as Pandit
- Manik Irani as Bharat Singh Henchman
- Suchita Trivedi as young Padmini

== Production ==
This was to be Anil Kapoor's official launch as leading man in Bollywood. That's why the opening titles read "Introducing Anil Kapoor". But Anil Kapoor went and signed Woh 7 Din when this film was delayed. He failed to report this to Sawaan Kumar Tak, making him very angry when he discovered what happened. Anil also did not tell Saawan Kumar Tak that he had done a film titled Kahan Kahan Se Guzar Gaya, 2 years prior. Since that film was completed and stuck not being released, Anil signed another film titled Rachna. Again, Anil refused to tell Sawaan Kumar about this. Sawaan was made to believe Anil Kapoor would only be doing his film.

== Soundtrack ==
All the songs were composed by Usha Khanna and lyrics were penned by Saawan Kumar.

The songs "Saath Jiyenge Saath Marenge" and "Ho Gaye Deewane Tumko Dekhkar" were very popular songs during those days.

#	Song	Singer
1	"Ho Gaye Deewane Tumko Dekhkar"	Kishore Kumar
2	"Doston Ki Haqeeqat Jo Hum Pe Khuli"	Kishore Kumar
3	"Saath Jiyenge Saath Marenge"	Manmohan Singh, Lata Mangeshkar
4	"Geeton Se Sargam, Kaliyon Se Shabnam"	Manmohan Singh, Lata Mangeshkar
5	"Aaj Sar E Mehfil Ikraar Karte Hai"	Lata Mangeshkar
6	"Tu Jo Kahe To"	Lata Mangeshkar
7	"Tere Dar Se Na Jaoon Khali"	N/A
8	"Bekhabar Thi Main Apni Jawani Se"	Asha Bhosle
