= Radha Bartake =

Indian actress and model (born 1959)

- Born: 1959 (age 66–67); Margão, Goa, Portuguese India, Portuguese Empire
- Other names: Radhika Bartake; Radhika; Radha; Kasturi
- Occupations: Actress, model
- Beauty pageant titleholder
- Title: Miss Goa 1973/1974; Femina Teen Princess India 1974; International Teen Princess 1974
- Major competitions: Miss Goa 1973/1974 (Winner); Femina Miss India 1974 (Femina Teen Princess India); International Teen Princess 1974 (Winner)

Radha Bartake (born 1959) is an Indian actress, model and beauty queen.

== Early life ==
Radha was born in 1959 in Military Hospital, Panaji, Goa, India in the year 1959.

== Career and pageantry ==
=== Miss Goa 1973-1974 ===
At the age of 14, she won Miss Goa in 1973–74.

=== Femina Miss India ===
After winning Miss Goa in the year 1973, she participated in Femina Miss India 1974 contest where she came second. She was crowned Femina Teen Princess India and was chosen to represent India at International Teen Princes contest held in Venezuela.

=== International Teen Princess 1974 ===
After being crowned Femina Teen Princess India 1974 she was sent to International Teen Princess. Where she took first place. She became first Indian to win International Teen Princess. The event was held in Caracas, Venezuela on 27 July 1974. Seventeen countries participated in the event.

=== Career as film actress ===
Later she turned as Indian film actress and made Bollywood debut in the film Sajan Bina Suhagan. She worked in many films. She worked in Marathi movies also. She became well known by the name 'Radha' or 'Kasturi'.

Today her fascination for sea shells and pets has become her favourite occupation. Along with her husband she runs a workshop in her home creating beautiful objects, souvenirs, and murals from sea-shells and terracotta. Into interior designing her creations can be viewed at the Taj chain of hotels, Goa handicrafts, Radisson, etc.

== Personal life ==
In 1986, Bartake married Captain R. K. Malik. She has two sons Sankalp Malik and Jaisinh Malik.

== Filmography ==
After completing her reign as International Teen Princess she returned to India and worked in several films and TV ads.

- Bhuierantlo Munis (1977) Konkani Film
- Saajan Bina Suhagan (1978) as Basanti Chopra
- Aao Pyaar Karen
- ''Daasi (1981 film)
- Preet Tujhi Mhaji
- Pukar (1983) as Anjali

Awards and achievements
Preceded by Sheena Pratap	Femina Teen Princess India; 1974	Succeeded by Nivurti Munim
Preceded by (Germany) Utta Kittelberger	International Teen Princess; 1975	Succeeded by -
