= Gomti Ke Kinare =

- Directed by: Saawan Kumar Tak
- Produced by: Saawan Kumar Tak
- Starring: Meena Kumari; Mumtaz
- Music by: Rahul Dev Burman; Majrooh Sultanpuri (lyrics)
- Release date: 22 November 1972
- Country: India
- Language: Hindi

Gomti Ke Kinare is a 1972 Indian Hindi-language drama film, directed by Saawan Kumar Tak in his directorial debut. The film stars Meena Kumari and Mumtaz. It was the last release of Meena Kumari, and was released posthumously on 22 November 1972, 8 months after her death on 31 March.

She shot the film through her failing health in 1971, and was apprehensive whether she would be able to complete the filming. Eventually, she did with the last schedule on 29 December 1971. However, despite the music score by R.D. Burman, the film failed at the box office.

Amitabh Bachchan was being considered (to play the hero, opposite Mumtaz) by Saawan Kumar and Meena Kumari. However, Mumtaz, who was close to the Khan brothers at the time, recommended Sameer Khan instead.

== Plot ==
Sameer lives a poor lifestyle in Bombay with his mother, Ganga, and maternal uncle, Nekiram. Nekiram works at a petrol pump, and his mother paints pictures and statuettes of Hindu deities. Sameer grows up, becomes an engineer, and lands a job with Khosla Enterprises, which is run by Chairman Gopaldas Khosla, where he proves his abilities and is soon promoted as Chief Engineer, and gets a bungalow to live in as well as a fancy car. He meets with Roshni, the daughter of Gopaldas; they fall in love, and soon get engaged. His idyllic lifestyle is shattered when a rival businessman, Chaganmal, alleges that Sameer's mother was actually Gangabai, a Lucknow-based courtesan (tawaif), who was never married, and that Nekiram is not his maternal uncle.

== Cast ==
- Meena Kumari as Ganga
- Bharat Bhushan as Bharat
- Mumtaz as Roshni Das
- Shyama as Mrs. Shyama Das
- Agha as Nekiram
- Jalal Agha as Dhobi
- Sameer Khan as Sameer "Munna"
- Harbans Darshan M. Arora as Doctor
- Chandrima Bhaduri as Shyama's Mother
- Rajan Haksar as Khan
- Helen as herself
- Daisy Irani as Chandni
- I. S. Johar as Seth Chellamal
- Alankar Joshi as Young Sameer "Munna" (as Master Alankar)
- Lalita Kumari as Champa (as Lalita Sinha)
- Manorama as Manoramabai
- Mukri as Himself
- Paintal as Film Kumar
- Randhir as Ramu
- Rehman as Gopal Das
- Asit Sen as Petrol Pump owner
- Tun Tun as Petrol Pump owner's wife

== Soundtrack ==
1. "Jeene Ka Din" - Kishore Kumar and Lata Mangeshkar
2. "Aao Aao Jaane Jahan" - Kishore Kumar and Asha Bhosle
3. "Jackpot Lag Gaya" - Manna Dey and Asha Bhosle
4. "Aaj To Meri Hasi Udai" - Lata Mangeshkar
5. "Khwab Ki Tasveer" - Manhar Udhas
