= Saajan Bina Suhagan =

- Directed by: Sawan Kumar Tak
- Screenplay by: Kamleshwar
- Story by: S. Kumar
- Produced by: Sawan Kumar Tak
- Starring: Rajendra Kumar; Nutan; Vinod Mehra
- Cinematography: K.H. Kapadia
- Edited by: David Dhawan
- Music by: Usha Khanna; Indivar, Sawan Kumar (lyrics)
- Release date: 27 October 1978
- Running time: 145 minutes
- Country: India
- Language: Hindi

Saajan Bina Suhagan (transl. A bride without a bridegroom) is a 1978 Indian Hindi-language drama film produced and directed by Saawan Kumar Tak. The film stars Rajendra Kumar, Nutan, Vinod Mehra, Padmini Kohlapure and Shreeram Lagoo, the film's music is by Usha Khanna. It has a popular song "Madhuban Khushboo Deta Hai" sung by Yesudas, Anuradha Paudwal and Hemlata. The film was remade in Tamil as Mangala Nayagi in 1980 and remade in Malayalam as Oru Kochukatha Aarum Parayathe Katha in 1984. Film and music expert Rajesh Subramanian reveals that Sawan Kumar Tak wanted Mohammed Rafi to render Madhuban khushboo deta hai but to the legendary singers date issues composer Usha Khanna was compelled to record the song in the voice of Yesudas.

== Synopsis ==
Asha (Nutan) lives a poor lifestyle along with her widowed father. She is madly in love with an aspiring doctor Raj Kumar (Rajendra Kumar) and hopes she will marry him when he completes his studies. When Raj abruptly announces that he has to travel abroad in order to complete his studies, Asha although not wanting to, has no choice but to wait for him while he completes his studies so they can marry. When Asha's father whilst on his deathbed, makes her promise to marry Simla-based Gopal Chopra (Shreeram Lagoo) who is the son of his friend, Shyamlal, Asha has no choice but to agree to her father's dying wish. The marriage takes place and soon they become parents of three daughters, Basanti (Radha Bartake) - a tomboy, who excels in self-defense; Barkha (Aarti Chopra) an aspiring dancer, and Bulbul (Padmini Kolhapure) who wants to be a professional piano player and is currently on medication due to a heart condition. Gopal gets a promotion and re-locates to Bombay but continues to remain in touch with his family. Then the past is re-visited when Raj, now a doctor, comes to live in their neighborhood. He meets with Asha, and decides to teach Bulbul piano lessons, while his brother, Advocate Anand (Vinod Mehra) romances Basanti. Their idyllic lives are shattered when Raj is arrested for killing a man named Mangatram who was blackmailing Asha for hiding a secret from the rest of her family.

== Cast ==
- Rajendra Kumar as Raj Kumar
- Nutan as Asha Chopra
- Vinod Mehra as Anand
- Shreeram Lagoo as Gopal Chopra
- Radha Bartake as Basanti Chopra (as World Teen Princess Kasturi)
- Aarti Chopra as Barkha Chopra
- Padmini Kolhapure as BulBul Chopra
- Leela Mishra as Chopra's neighbor
- Satyendra Kapoor as Dr. Malhotra
- Nana Palsikar as Asha's Father
- Pinchoo Kapoor as Guest appearance
- Chandrashekhar as Guest appearance
- Jankidas as Guest appearance

== Music ==
The film has music by Usha Khanna and lyrics by Indivar

- "Madhuban Khushboo Deta Hai, Saagar Saawan Deta hai" (version 1) - K.J. Yesudas (Raga Ahir Bhairav)
- "Madhuban Khushboo Deta Hai, Saagar Saawan Deta hai" (version 1) - K.J. Yesudas (Raga Ahir Bhairav)
- "O Mamma, Dear Mamma, Happy Birthday To You" - Aarti Mukherjee, Chandrani Mukherjee, Shivangi Kapoor
- "Kaise Jeet Lete Hain Log Dil Kisi Ka" - Mohammad Rafi
- "Sata Sata Ke Khush Hote ho" - Suman Kalyanpur
- "Jijaji Jijaji, Honewale Jijaji" - Anuradha Paudwal, Suresh Wadkar, Dilraj Kaur
- "O Jaani, Jaani Tum O Jaane Tum" - Asha Bhosle
- "Madhuban Khushboo Deta Hai, Saagar Saawan Deta Hai" (duet) - K.J. Yesudas, Anuradha Paudwal
- "Madhuban Khushboo Deta Hai, Saagar Saawan Deta hai" (female) - Usha Khanna
