= International Teen Princess =

Former teen beauty pageant

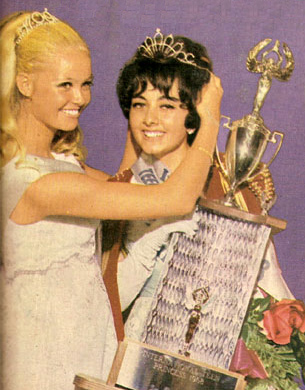
Kristiina Kankaanpää Teen Princess 1967 from Finland is crowning Elaheh Azodi Teen Princess 1968 from Iran.

The International Teen Princess was a contest that began in 1966 in Chicago, Illinois, where it was held for four years. In 1970 its name was changed to World Teen Princess and held three times in European locations. In 1973 it was changed to two contest; one Teen Princess that was continued for two times and apparently was discontinued after the 1974 pageant in Venezuela. other Miss Teenage Peace International in Oranjestad, Aruba that in 1974 its name was changed to " Miss Teenage Intercontinental".

In 1969, the grand prize was a trip around the world.

== Winners ==
- 1966: Japan - Reiko Oshida
- 1967: Finland - Kristiina Kankaanpää
- 1968: Iran - Elaheh Azodi
- 1969: Israel - Sharona Marash
- 1970: Norway - Elisabeth Krogh
- 1971: Venezuela - Maria Conchita Alonso Bustillo
- 1972: United States - Kathy St. Johns
- 1973: Germany - Ute Kittelberger
- 1974: India - Radha Bartake

| Year | Teen Princess | Winner Country | Date | Entries | Host city | Host country | Results |
|---|---|---|---|---|---|---|---|
| 1966 | Reiko Oshida | Japan | 21-May | 12 | Chicago, Illinois | United States | 1. Japan Reiko Oshida; 2. Philippines Mary Jane Madamba; 3. France Betty Dalbrey; 4. Austria Jeannette Wellems |
| 1967 | Kristiina Kankaanpa | Finland | 26-May | 15 | Chicago, Illinois | United States | 1. Finland Kristiina Kankaanpää; 2. India Chandana Banerjee; 3. Iran Shahla Vahabzadeh; 4. Japan Setsuko Seo |
| 1968 | Elaheh Azodi (fa) | Iran | 08-Jun | 16 | Chicago, Illinois | United States | 1. Iran Elaheh Azodi; 2. New Zealand Lynne Pledger; 3. Venezuela Jeannette Amelia Coromoto Sánchez; 4. Portugal Rita Romina de Mattos Chaves |
| 1969 | Sharona Marash | Israel | 07-Jun | 12 | Chicago, Illinois | United States | 1. Israel Sharona Marash; 2. Venezuela Milagros Gámez; 3. South Africa Marlene Arkin; 4. Philippines Edna Milagros Elegado |
| 1970 | Elisabeth Krogh | Norway | 25-Jul | 21 | West Berlin | Germany | 1. Norway Elisabeth Krogh; 2. France Helene Lefort; 3. Sweden Ann Sofi Hjalmarson |
| 1971 | Maria Conchita Alonso | Venezuela | 10-Jul | 16 | Lisbon | Portugal | 1. Venezuela Maria Conchita Alonso Bustillo; 2. Norway Siri Gro Nygard; 3. Germany Evelin Jörg |
| 1972 | Kathy St. Johns | United States | 12-Jun | 26 | West Berlin | Germany | 1. United States Kathy St. Johns; 2. Iran Roya Rouhani Moghadam; 3. Israel Emmi Hoder; 4. Brazil Adrienne Cançado Rohfs; 5. Sweden Ase Thaström |
| 1973 | Utta Kittelberger | Germany | 16-Jun | 21 | Izmir | Turkey | 1. Germany Ute Kittelberger; 2. Turkey Özlenen Deniz Birdinc; 3. Ireland Mary Hunnigan |
| 1974 | Radha Bartake | India | 27-July | 17 | Caracas | Venezuela | 1. India Radha Bartake; 2. Canada Diana MacDonald; 3. Curaçao Susana Juliet; 4. Germany Gitti Schulz; 5. United States Cindy Harrell |
