= Ketti =

- town
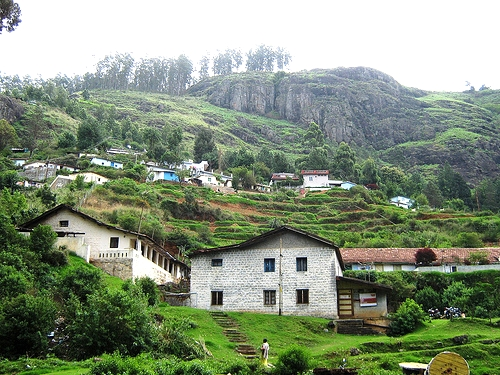
- Ketti Post Office

- Location in Tamil Nadu, India Ketti (India)
- Coordinates: 11.40°N 76.70°E
- Country: India
- State: Tamil Nadu
- District: The Nilgiris

Languages
  - Official: Tamil, Badaga
- Time zone: UTC+5:30 (IST)
- PIN: 643 215
- Telephone code: 0423
- Vehicle registration: TN 43
- Website: https://kettivillage.now.sh footnotes =

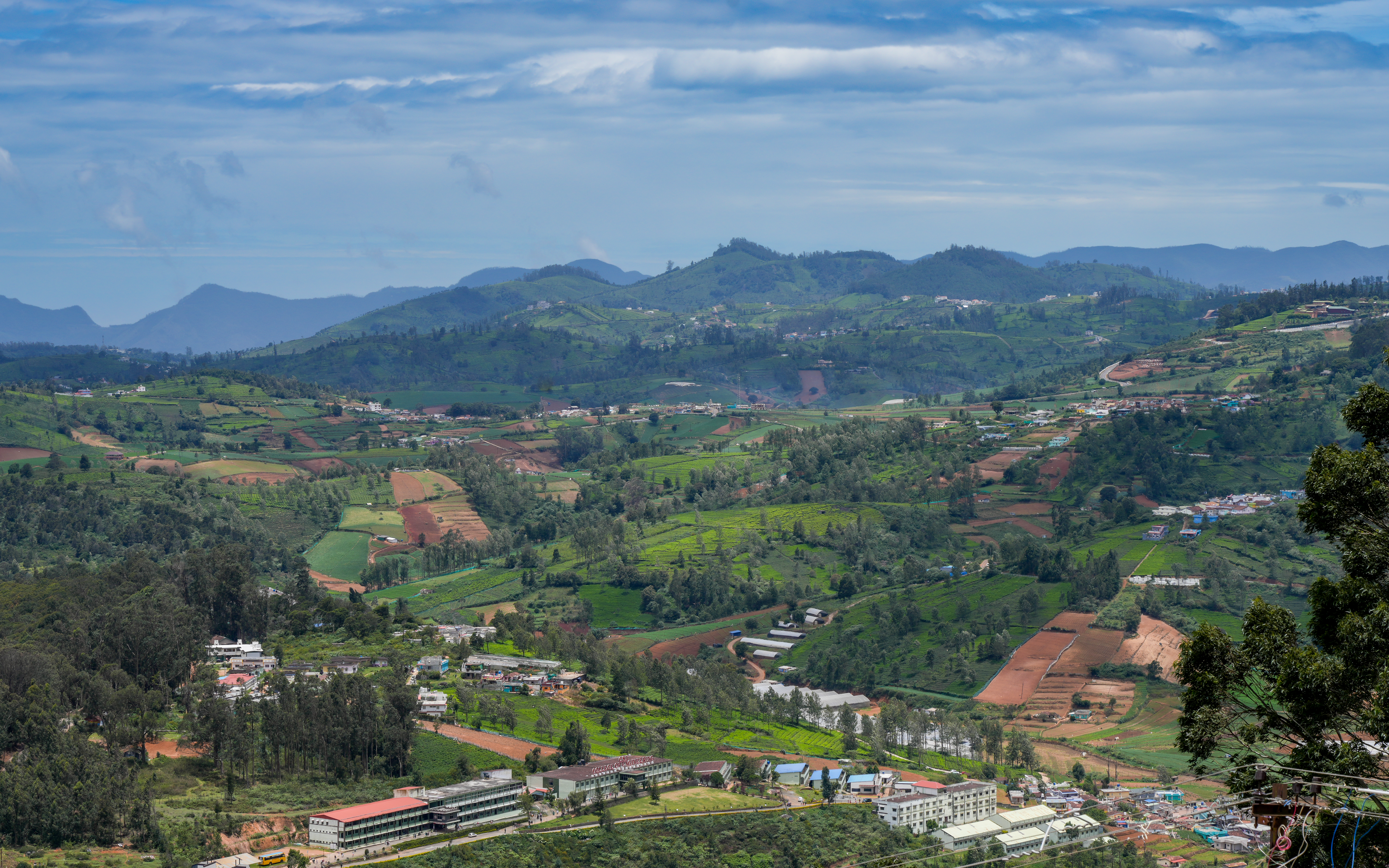
Ketti valley, view to the southwest from NH-181

Ketti, also called Ketti Valley, is a small town nestled in a large valley of the same name. It is located in The Nilgiris District of Tamil Nadu State, South India and is a Revenue Village of Coonoor Taluk. Upper Ketti is another village called Yellanahalli, which is located on the main Coonoor to Ooty road.

== History ==
Ketti which received 82 cm on 8 November 2009 (Depression ARB/03 or intensified Cyclone Phyaan ) is the record holder for highest rainfall registered in 24 hours in Tamil Nadu.

== Geography ==
The valley is the last major valley in route to Ooty along the Ooty-Coonoor highway. However, due to the extensive development of the valley in the recent years, the fauna present here has dwindled to a select few.

== Culture ==
The people present here are mostly Badaga and Tamils with certain immigrants from other parts of Tamil Nadu, Kerala, Karnataka.

The chief language spoken here is Badaga and Tamil, although many people understand English, Malayalam and Kannada. Religion practised here is mostly Hinduism. However, strong influences remain of the Christian missionaries who lived here during the early 1900s.

== Demographics ==
As of 2001 India census, Ketti had a population of 24,465. Males constitute 49% of the population and females 51%. Ketti has an average literacy rate of 75%, higher than the national average of 59.5%: male literacy is 83%, and female literacy is 68%. In Ketti, 10% of the population is under 6 years of age.

== Economy ==
Most of the population are manual laborers. Agriculture, rearing livestock, masonry constitute the majority of the work done by the individuals in this place. In addition to this, they also take up jobs in the surrounding industrial establishments, such as the Needle Industries, the mushroom factory, Ambica tea factory, Mini flower garden near Palada bus stop and the various educational institutions (these include the CSI College of Engineering, the Laid-law Memorial School and the CSI Middle School).

== Facilities ==
It services all the towns, villages and hattis in the entire valley. The nearby town of Santhoor (located at the lowest point in the valley, also locally known as ramakrishnas place) has a post office. The State Bank of India operates a Ketti valley branch, which is situated near the CSI College of Engineering.

== Transport ==
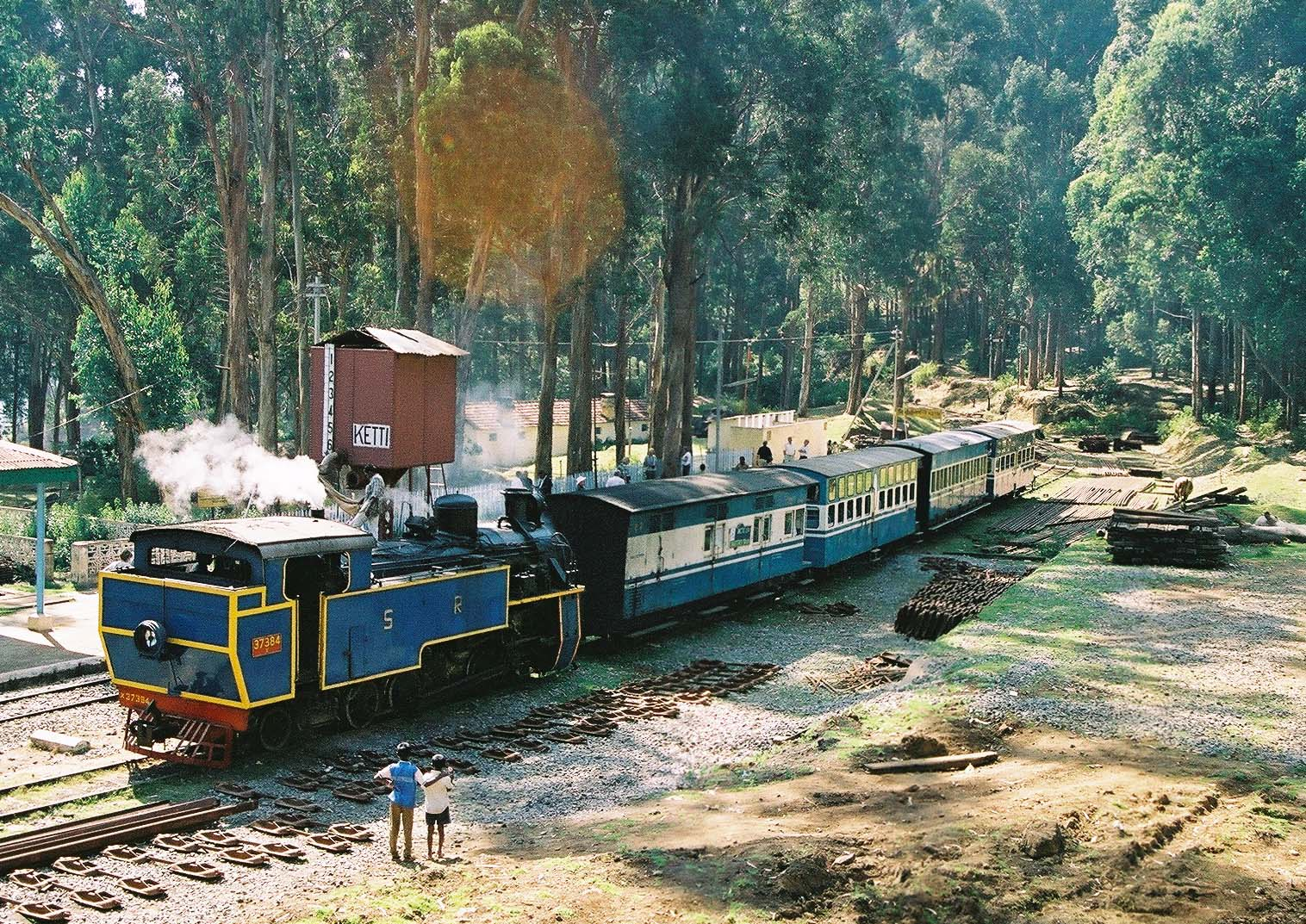
Nilgiri Mountain Railway train at Ketti railway station

Ketti is accessible by rail or road. The mountain train NMR (recently declared as a national heritage site by UNESCO and which provides a connection to the Chennai - Coimbatore - Mettupalayam Niligiri Express), can be boarded from the Mettupalayam station (at the foothills of the Nilgiris) to the Ketti railway station.

== Education ==
- The Laidlaw Memorial School and Junior College, Ketti
- The CSI College of Engineering, an engineering institution part of the Anna University, Chennai. This is the only one engineering college in the whole Nilgiris district.
