= Souten =

- Poster
- Directed by: Saawan Kumar Tak
- Produced by: Saawan Kumar Tak
- Starring: Rajesh Khanna; Tina Munim; Padmini Kolhapure
- Edited by: David Dhawan
- Music by: Usha Khanna
- Release date: 3 June 1983
- Country: India
- Language: Hindi

Souten (transl. Co-Wife [or] Husband's other wife) is a 1983 Indian Hindi-language drama film directed by Saawan Kumar Tak, starring Rajesh Khanna, Tina Munim, Padmini Kolhapure, Prem Chopra and Pran. It was written by Kamleshwar, with music by Usha Khanna. The song "Shayad Meri Shaadi" sung by Kishore Kumar and Lata Mangeshkar became especially memorable. Khanna's chemistry with Munim also proved popular. The film was remade in Kannada as Krishna Nee Begane Baro and in Telugu as Tene Manasulu. The movie Souten was a Golden Jubilee hit.

== Plot ==
Movie starts with Shyam (Rajesh Khanna) standing in a court and reciting his story. Shyam is an ambitious man who meets Rukmini (Tina Munim), the daughter of a millionaire, and falls in love with her, they get married with support of Ruku's father (Pran) but her step-mother Renu and uncle, Sampatlal (step-mother's brother) try to instigate her to not marry Shyam by telling her that he doesn't loves Ruku, rather he loves Pran's money. Despite this, they get married. After marriage, Shyam's passion towards work lets Renu and Sampatlal insert themselves in their relationship. Renu instigates her to do an operation to prevent pregnancy for 5 years by telling her that pregnancy can ruin her figure, Shyam unknowingly doesn't take any precautions which results in Ruku not being able to conceive forever. Consequently, their relationship sours. Radha (Padmini Kolhapure), the daughter of Shyam's employee, Gopal, brings hope into Shyam's life. Sampatlal convinces Ruku that Shyam is having secret affair with Radha. Ruku invites Radha and Mr. Gopal and insults her of having an affair with her husband. Mr. Pran dies giving all his property to Rukmini and Shyam and leaves nothing for Renu and Sampatlal. Shyam and Ruku get separated without divorce. Sampatlal ask Radha to marry someone else to unite Ruku and Shyam to which Radha answers positively. Soon she bears child of her husband Gunwant Lal but he suspects her of bearing Shyam's child. Soon it is revealed that Gunwant Lal has another wife and three children. After knowing this Gunwant Lal tries to kill Gopal but accidentally kills himself and Gopal commits suicide leaving a letter for Radha informing her that she is a widow. Shyam takes care of her and her daughter. Here the story, Shyam was reciting, ends. Sampatlal threatens to prison Shyam by next hearing. Ruku gives Shyam a photo (edited by Sampatlal) in which Shyam and Radha are shown married. Shyam finds an evidence against Renu and Sampatlal's conspiracy. Radha goes to convince Rukmini that she is not married to Shyam' She tells that she worships Shyam and that he is like a God to her. She then consumes poison. Shyam tries to save but she tells him that she is lucky to die at his feet. And in cremation ceremony, Rukmini is shown taking care of her child while Shyam performs her last rites.

== Cast ==
- Rajesh Khanna as Shyam Mohit
- Tina Munim as Rukmini Mohit (Ruku)
- Padmini Kolhapure as Radha
- Pran as Raisaheb Prannath Pasha
- Prem Chopra as Sampatlal
- Shreeram Lagoo as Gopal
- Shashikala as Renu Prannath Pasha
- Paresh Rawal as Mr. Jain
- Vijay Arora as Vijay
- Satyen Kappu
- Roopesh Kumar as Bingo (Photographer)
- Yunus Parvez as Public Prosecutor, Lawyer Saxena
- Sudhir Dalvi as Public Prosecutor, Lawyer Mohan
- T.P.Jain as Gunwant Lal

== Production ==
According to the director, Souten was the first Hindi film ever to be shot in Mauritius. Zeenat Aman and Parveen Babi were offered the role of Rukmini. However, both of them turned it down, and Tina Munim was subsequently signed.

== Awards ==
31st Filmfare Awards:

Nominated

- Best Supporting Actress – Padmini Kolhapure
- Best Music Director – Usha Khanna
- Best Lyricist – Saawan Kumar for "Shayad Meri Shaadi Ka Khayal"
- Best Lyricist – Saawan Kumar for "Zindagi Pyaar Ka Geet"
- Best Male Playback Singer – Kishore Kumar for "Shayad Meri Shaadi Ka Khayal"

== Soundtrack ==
The music of this movie was composed by Usha Khanna (one of the two female music composers to have ever worked in Bollywood). Saawan Kumar Tak himself penned the lyrics to the famous songs.The song 'Zindagi Pyar Ka Geet Hai' of this movie is a popular one.

The song, 'Main Teri Chhoti Behna Hoon' is sampled on the Four Tet track 'Morning' on the album Morning/Evening.

The song, 'Meri Pehle Hi Tang Thi Choli' was supposed to be a duet between Kishore Kumar and Lata Mangeshkar. However, Mangeshkar refused to sing this song due to the explicit lyrics. This led to Anuradha Paudwal singing it with Kumar.

| # | Title | Singer(s) |
|---|---|---|
| 1 | "Shayad Meri Shaadi" | Kishore Kumar, Lata Mangeshkar |
| 2 | "Meri Pehle Hi Tang Thi Choli" | Kishore Kumar, Anuradha Paudwal |
| 3 | "Sasu Tirath Sasura Tirath" | Kishore Kumar |
| 4 | "Zindagi Pyar Ka Geet Hai" (Female) | Lata Mangeshkar |
| 5 | "Zindagi Pyar Ka Geet Hai" (Male) | Kishore Kumar |
| 6 | "Jab Apne Ho Jayen" | Asha Bhosle |
| 7 | "Main Teri Chhoti Behna Hoon" | Lata Mangeshkar |
| 8 | "Zindagi Pyar Ka Geet Hai (Male, Part 2)" | Kishore Kumar |

This film was a huge success of the year 1983. It was one of Rajesh Khanna's favourites.

== Bibliography ==
- Usman, Yasser (2014). Rajesh Khanna: The Untold Story of India's First Superstar. India: Penguin Books. ISBN 9780143423614.
