= Do Khiladi =

- Directed by: Jugal Kishore
- Production company: Jugal Productions
- Release date: 1976
- Country: India
- Language: Hindi

Do Khiladi is a 1976 Bollywood action drama film directed by Jugal Kishore. The film stars Vinod Mehra and Anita Guha.

== Cast ==
- Vinod Mehra
- Zaheera
- Jayshree T.
- Anita Guha
- Indrani Mukherjee
- Paintal
- Jani Babu

== Music ==
1. "Rat Abhee Bakee Hai" – Jaani Babu Qawwal
2. "Jhumta Savan Dekho Aaya, Barkha Ne Pyar Barsaya" – Mohammed Rafi
3. "Dosto Kya Kahe Hum Tumse" – Asha Bhosle
4. "Meri Bhi Koi Behna Hoti" – Kishore Kumar
5. "Tu Sat Kamro Me Band Padi Ho" – Amit Kumar
