= Mangala Nayagi =

- Theatrical release poster
- Directed by: Krishnan–Panju
- Written by: A. L. Narayanan (dialogues)
- Produced by: Sankarlal
- Starring: Srikanth; K. R. Vijaya
- Cinematography: C. S. RaviBabu
- Edited by: Panjabi
- Music by: V. Kumar
- Release date: 21 March 1980
- Country: India
- Language: Tamil

Mangala Nayaki is a 1980 Indian Tamil-language drama film directed by Krishnan–Panju, starring Srikanth and K. R. Vijaya. The film was released on 21 March 1980. It is a remake of the 1978 Hindi film Saajan Bina Suhagan. This film also marked the acting debut on-screen of Shobana as a child artist.

== Cast ==
- K. R. Vijaya
- Sarath Babu
- Srikanth
- Shobana
- Sivachandran
- Manorama
- Nisha
- Srigeetha

== Soundtrack ==
Soundtrack was composed by V. Kumar and lyrics were written by Vaali.

Track listing
No.	Title	Singer(s)	Length
1.	"O Yamma"	S. P. Sailaja, P. Susheela
2.	"Rajathi"	S. P. Balasubrahmanyam, Vani Jairam
3.	"Mappillai"	T. M. Soundararajan, S. P. Sailaja
4.	"Vadivelan"	P. Susheela
5.	"Kangalal"	K. J. Yesudas, P. Susheela

== Critical reception ==
Kanthan of Kalki praised the acting of Vijaya and Srikanth, Krishnan–Panju's direction and Ravibabu's cinematography and concluded even after reforms like widow marriage and women's right to divorce, films like this continue to come out, but emotional performances do require old tropes. Anna praised the acting, music, dialogues, cinematography and direction.
