= Saawan Kumar Tak =

Indian film director, producer, and lyricist (1936–2022)

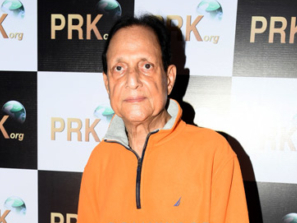
- Saawan Kumar Tak in 2017
- Born: 9 August 1936; Jaipur, Jaipur State, British India (present-day Jaipur, Rajasthan, India)
- Died: 25 August 2022 (aged 86); Mumbai, Maharashtra, India
- Occupations: Director; Screenwriter; Producer; Lyricist
- Years active: 1967–2006

Saawan Kumar Tak (9 August 1936 – 25 August 2022) was an Indian film director, producer, and lyricist. He directed many Hindi films, including successful films like Saajan Bina Suhagan, Souten, Souten Ki Beti, Sanam Bewafa, Bewaffa Se Waffa. He is credited with giving break to actors such as Sanjeev Kumar and Mehmood Junior. His most famous directorial venture was Rajesh Khanna starrer Souten, which was the first Indian film to be shot in Mauritius.

== Career ==
Saawan Kumar began his career as the producer of the 1967 Sanjeev Kumar starrer film Naunihal. He was the one who gave the name Sanjeev to actor Haribhai Jariwala. The film received the Presidential mention at the National Awards. His directorial debut was with the film Gomti Ke Kinare (1972), which was Meena Kumari's last film, and released posthumously. He was also a prolific lyricist and has written songs for most of his produced and directed films. Apart from this, he has written the lyrics of songs for movies produced and directed by other film-makers. Among these are "Sabak", the 1973 movie starring Shatrughan Sinha and Poonam and featuring the popular song "Barkha Rani Zara Jamke Barso". He penned some songs from the film Kaho Naa... Pyaar Hai and all the songs from the 2004 film Dev. He has also written lyrics of some very popular songs of his own movies such as "Zindagi Pyar Ka Geet Hai" Souten, "Hum Bhool Gaye" Souten Ki Beti, "Yeh Dil Bewafa Se Wafa" Bewaffa Se Waffa all sung by Lata Mangeshkar. He was married to music director Usha Khanna.

== Filmography ==
=== As Director ===
- 1972 Gomti Ke Kinare
- 1974 Hawas
- 1977 Ab Kya Hoga
- 1978 Saajan Bina Suhagan
- 1980 Oh Bewafa
- 1981 Saajan Ki Saheli
- 1983 Souten
- 1984 Laila
- 1986 Preeti
- 1987 Pyar Ki Jeet
- 1989 Souten Ki Beti
- 1991 Sanam Bewafa
- 1992 Bewaffa Se Waffa
- 1993 Khal-Naaikaa
- 1994 Chaand Kaa Tukdaa
- 1995 Sanam Harjai
- 1997 Salma Pe Dil Aa Gaya
- 1999 Mother
- 2003 Dil Pardesi Ho Gayaa
- 2006 Saawan
