= Ketti railway station =

Railway station in Tamil Nadu, India

Ketti
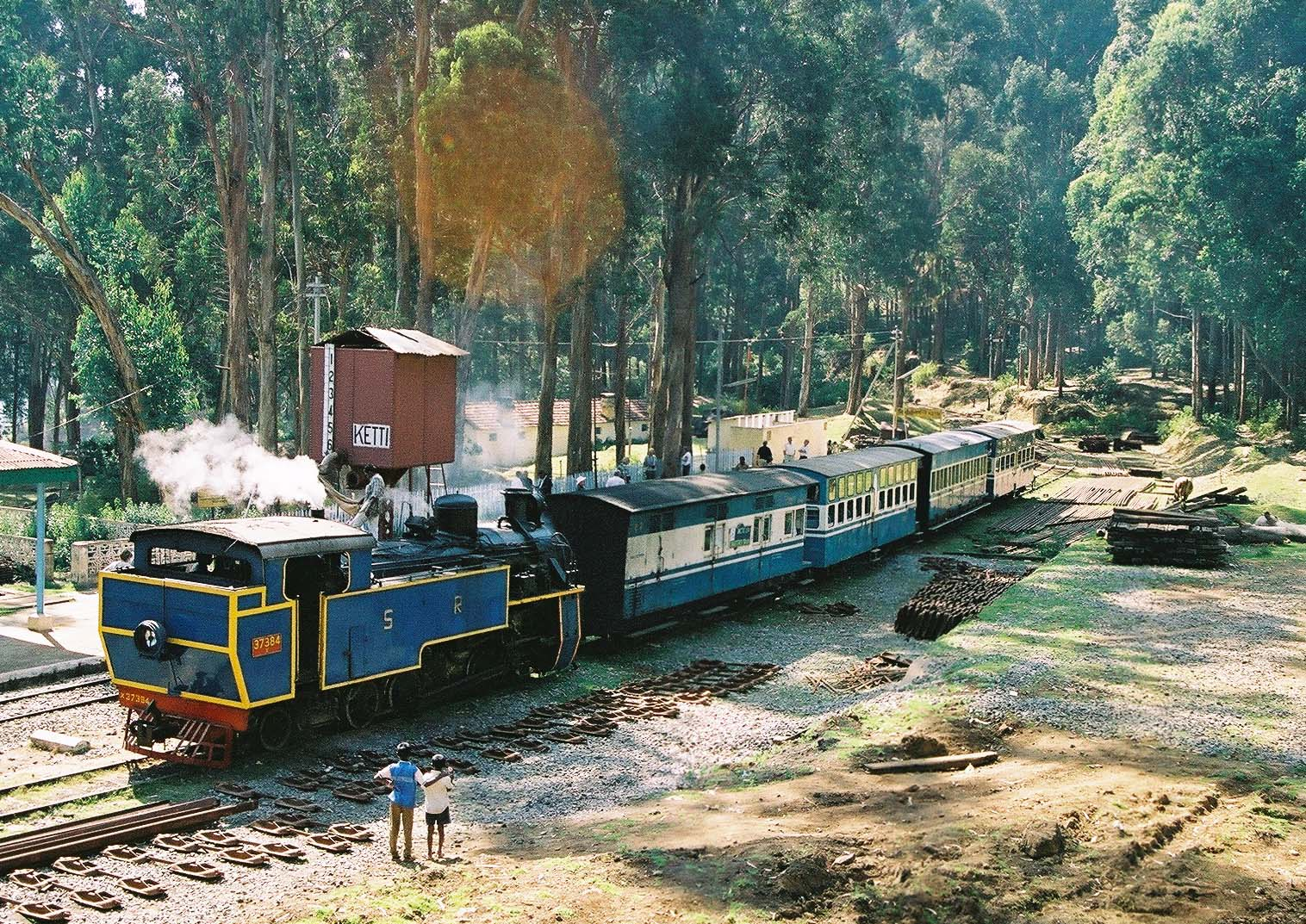

General information
- Location: India
- Coordinates: 11.3820°N 76.7375°E
- Elevation: 2,103 metres (6,900 ft)
- System: Light rail
- Owner: Indian Railways
- Operator: Southern Railway zone
- Line: Nilgiri Mountain Railway
- Platforms: 1
- Connections: Bus

Construction
- Structure type: At-grade
- Parking: Yes
- Cycle facilities: Yes

Other information
- Station code: KXT
- Fare zone: Indian Railways

History
- Opened: 1908; 118 years ago
Location
- Location within India Location within Tamil Nadu

Ketti railway station (station code: KXT) is an NSG–6 category Indian railway station in Salem railway division of Southern Railway zone. It is a railway station of the Nilgiri Mountain Railway in Ketti, a hill station town, in the Nilgiris district of Tamil Nadu. It is a World Heritage Site and the popular Ooty passenger passes by the station. It is administered by the Salem railway division of the Southern Railway zone. The station code is:KXT.
