= Usha Khanna =

Indian music director (born 1941)

- Born: 7 October 1941 (age 84); Gwalior, Gwalior State, British India
- Occupation: Music director
- Years active: 1959 – present
- Spouse: Sawan Kumar Tak (separated)

Usha Khanna (born 7 October 1941) is an Indian music director in Hindi cinema. She is the third female music director to enter the Hindi film industry, after Jaddan Bai and Saraswati Devi and is one of the most commercially successful music directors in the male dominated music industry. She is most known for songs like “maine rakha hai mohabbat” (Shabnam), “Hum tum say juda ho ke” (ek sapaira ek lutaira), “gaa deewane jhoom ke” (Flat no. 9), "Chhodo kal ki baatein" (Hum Hindustani), "Shaayad meri shaadi ka khayal" (Souten), and “tu is tarah Se meri zindagi” (Aap to aise na the). She remained active for more than 3 decades from 1960s to 1980s. She is still active making some music for some movies and television-serials, more than 40 years after her debut as music director in Dil Deke Dekho (1959). She received a Filmfare Award nomination for composing the songs for the huge hit film Souten (1983). She was married to director, producer, lyricist, Sawan Kumar Tak, from whom she separated later on.

== Biography ==
Born in Gwalior, her father, Manohar Khanna, was a lyricist and singer, working as Assistant Superintendent in the Water Works Department in the then Gwalior State. When he came to Mumbai for some work in 1946 he by chance met Jaddanbai who was mother of Hindi film actress Nargis Dutt. On her request he started writing gazals for Hindi films by the name, Jaaved Anwar. He was getting a monthly salary of Rs. 250 in Gwalior State and Jaddanabi offered him Rs. 800 for 3 gazals which he wrote for Jaddanbai's Nargis Art Productions film, Romeo Juliet.

The popular music director O. P. Nayyar introduced Usha Khanna to Sashadhar Mukherjee, a powerful man in the Indian film industry at that time. She sang a song for Mukherjee, and when he realised that she had composed the song on her own, he told her to compose two songs per day for one year. After a few months, Mukherjee signed her as the composer for his movie Dil Deke Dekho (1959) as a music composer. The film, which also introduced the actress Asha Parekh, became a big hit, and Mukherjee hired her again for another Asha Parekh starrer Hum Hindustani (1961).

After she started composing music for Hindi movies, Usha Khanna struggled to establish herself as a music director, despite producing many hit songs. She often collaborated with Asha Bhosle, who referred to Usha Khanna as her daughter, and Mohammed Rafi. This trio produced many hit songs. Some of songs sung by Mohammed Rafi under composition of Usha Khanna are in Dil Deke Dekho (1959), Hawas (1974), Saajan Ki Saheli (1981), and Aap To Aise Na The (1980).

Saawan Kumar was often the lyricist for Usha Khanna, and wrote most of the lyrics for her songs. He directed and produced eleven movies she scored the music for. Usha Khanna was married to Sawan Kumar Tak but later they separated though remained on good terms. Usha Khanna remained quite active as a composer and the last movie she has given music to was in 2003. The movie was Dil Pardesi Ho Gaya, produced and directed by her ex-husband Saawan Kumar.

Usha Khanna often took inspiration from Arabic music, which she liked and she claims that she has never lifted any song directly, but that she has composed something along the lines.

Usha Khanna herself also sang a few songs as a playback singer.

Many of Usha Khanna's songs are still very popular. Some of the other movies she composed for are Shabnam, Aankh Micholi, Saajan Bina Suhagan, Souten, Sajan ki Saheli, Ab Kya Hoga, Lal Bungla, Dada, Do Khiladi, Hanste Khelte.

In 1979 K. J. Yesudas received Filmfare award for her song "Dil ke tukde tukde" in the film Dada.

Usha Khanna has given music to non-Hindi movies too. The Malayalam movie Moodal Manju (1969) is still remembered for some of the finest songs in Malayalam including 'Nee Madhu Pakaroo' by K. J. Yesudas and 'Maanasa Mani veenayil' by S.Janaki. Agni nilavu and Puthooram Puthri Unniyarcha are the other Malayalam movies done by her.

The effort she had put earlier in life to establish herself in the industry, made her realise how difficult it was to break through, and this made her often give the chance to new singers. She gave the chance to the singers who were little known at that time – Anupama Deshpande, Pankaj Udhas, Hemlata, Mohammed Aziz, Roop Kumar Rathod, Shabbir Kumar, and Sonu Nigam. Many of these went on to become notable singers.

Usha Khanna also directed music for Doordarshan superhit serial Chandrakanta (1994)

Usha Khanna lives in Mumbai.

== Filmography ==
- Dil Deke Dekho (1959)
- Hum Hindustani (1960)
- Flat No. 9 (1961)
- Aao Pyaar Karen (1964)
- Shabnam (1964)
- Nishan (1965)
- Main Hoon Alladin (1965)
- Faisla (1965)
- Ek Sapera Ek Lutera (1965)
- Main Wohi Hoon (1966)
- Lal Bangla (1966)
- Alibaba And Forty Thieves (1966)
- Baadal (1966)
- Insaaf (1966)
- Dada (1966)
- Khoon Ka Khoon (1966)
- Dilruba (1967)
- Raat Andheri Thi (1967)
- Sardar (1967)
- Aag (1967)
- Johar in Bombay (1967)
- Woh Koi Aur Hoga (1967)
- Chand Par Chadayee (1967)
- Fareb (1968)
- Ek Raat (1968)
- Roop Rupaiya (1968)
- Ek Phool, Ek Bhool (1968)
- Mera Naam Johar (1968)
- Haye Mera Dil (1968)
- Samay Bada Balwan (1969)
- Simla Road (1969)
- Bandish (1969)
- Hum Ek Hain (1969)
- Natija (1969)
- Anjaan Hai Koi (1969)
- Moodalmanju (1970) (Malayalam)
- Insaan Aur Shaitan (1970)
- Begunah (1970)
- Calcutta After Midnight (1970)
- Sasta Khoon Mehnga Pyar (1970)
- Sau Saal Beet Gaye (1970)
- Kaun Ho Tum (1970)
- Ilzaam (1970)
- Bahroopia (1971)
- Behke Kadam (1971)
- Sher-E-Watan (1971)
- Ek Paheli (1971)
- Criminals, The (1971)
- Naag Pooja (1971)
- Khoj (1971)
- Murder in Circus (1971)
- Munimji (1972)
- Bijli (1972)
- Tanhaai (1972)
- Sabak (1973)
- Honeymoon (1973)
- Aparadhi (1974)
- Hawas (1974)
- Aa Jaa Sanam (1975)
- Do Khiladi (1976)
- Mazdoor Zindabad (1976)
- Ladki Bholi Bhali (1976)
- Gumrah (1976)
- Ab Kya Hua (1977)
- Alibaba Marjinaa (1977)
- Saajan Bina Suhagan (1978)
- Sone Ka Dil Lohe Ke Haath (1978)
- Nagin Aur Suhagin (1979)
- Meri Biwi Ki Shaadi (1979)
- Bin Phere Hum Tere (1979)
- Dada (1979)
- Bhayanak (1979)
- Beshaque (1980)
- Saajan Ki Saheli (1980)
- Aap To Aise Na The (1980)
- Bambai Ka Maharaja (1980)
- Kaaran (1981)
- Aadat Se Majboor (1981)
- Hotel (1981)
- Shama (1981)
- Tajurba (1981)
- Ladaaku (1981)
- Abichar (1981) (Bengali)
- Sati Aur Bhagwan (1982)
- Patthar Ki Lakeer (1982)
- Pyara Dost (1982)
- Lakshmi (1982)
- Panchvi Manzil (1982)
- Anokha Bandhan (1982)
- Waqt Ke Shehzade (1982)
- Gopichand Jasoos (1982)
- Souten (1983)
- Raaste Aur Rishte (1983)
- Bekhabar (1983)
- Achha Bura (1983)
- Door Desh (1983)
- Jai Baba Amarnath (1983)
- Sweekar Kiya Maine (1983)
- Sardar (1984)
- Laila (1984)
- Captain Barry (1984)
- Kunwari Bahu (1984)
- Divorce (1984)
- Rakta Bandhan (1984)
- Pyaasi Aankhen (1984)
- Zamana (1985)
- Vishal (1985)
- Yaar Kasam (1985)
- Paisa Yeh Paisa (1985)
- Mehak (1985)
- Maan Maryada (1985)
- Aurat (1986)
- Badkaar
- Dharmam (1986; Tamil)
- Sasti Dulhan Mahenga Dulha (1986)
- Jawani Ki Kahani (1986)
- Preeti (1986)
- Besahara (1987)
- Pyar Ki Jeet (1987)
- Kanoon Kanoon Hai (1987)
- Daku Hasina (1987)
- Kaun Jeeta Kaun Hara (1987)
- Saat Bijliyan (1988)
- Mere Baad (1988)
- Kharidar (1988)
- Pahli Aurat Pahla Mard (1988)
- Aurat Aur Patthar (1989)
- Lahu Ki Awaz (1989)
- Khuli Khidki (1989)
- Naya Khoon (1990)
- Amavas Ki Raat (1990)
- Anuraag (1990)
- Rajoo Dada (1990)
- Qatil Jawani (1990)
- Lohe Ke Haath (1990)
- Halaat (1990)
- Jaan Lada Denge (1990)
- Deewane (1991)
- Aag Laga Do Sawan Ko (1991)
- Pucca Badmash (1991)
- Khooni Raat (1991)
- Ramwati (1991)
- Mehandi Ban Gai Khoon (1991)
- Bewafa Se Wafaa (1992)
- Kumsin Hasina (1992)
- Dil Apna Aur Preet Paraee (1993)
- Intaqam Ke Sholay (1994)
- Papi Farishte (1995)
- Sanam Harjai (1995)
- Ghar Bazar (1998)
- Khofnak Mahal (1998)
- Mann, Moti 'Ne Kaach (1999)
- Puthooramputhri Unniyarcha (2002) (Malayalam)
- Dil Pardesi Ho Gayaa (2003)
