= Mamballi =

Mamballi 'Mambally'
- village
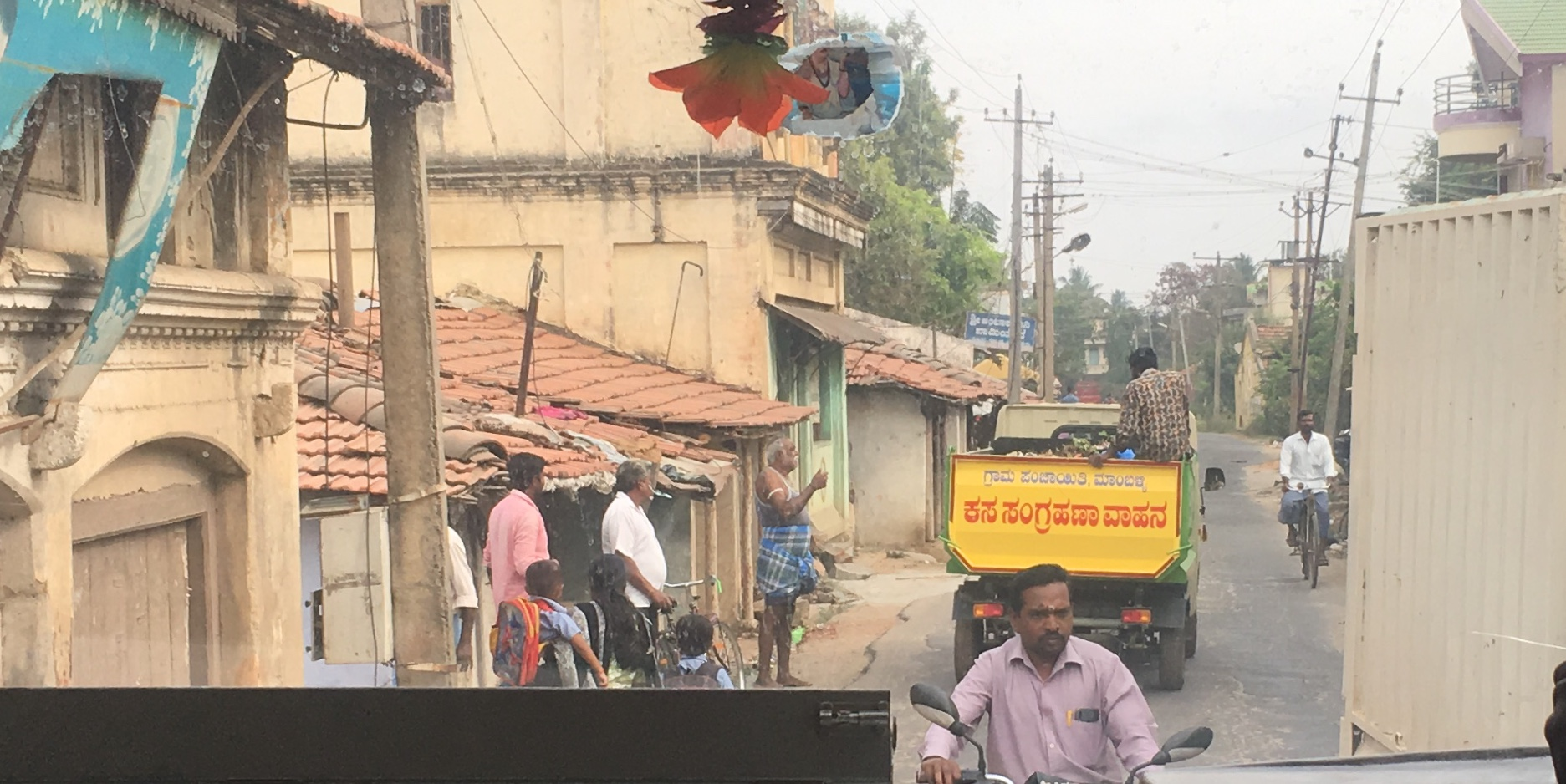

- Location in Karnataka, India Mamballi (India)
- Coordinates: 12.06°N 77.04°E
- Country: India
- State: Karnataka
- District: Chamarajanagar
- Talukas: Yelandur

Government
  - Body: Gram panchayat

Population (2001)
  - Total: 6,250

Languages
  - Official: Kannada
- Time zone: UTC+5:30 (IST)
- PIN: 571442
- Vehicle registration: KA-10
- Nearest city: Kollegal
- Climate: Mamballi is a village full of coconut trees, thus it is very cool and peaceful. (Köppen)

Mamballi is a village in the southern state of Karnataka, India. It is located in the Yelandur taluk of Chamarajanagar district.

== Demographics ==
As of 2001 India census, Mamballi had a population of 6250 with 3086 males and 3164 females.

== See also ==
- Chamarajanagar
- Districts of Karnataka
