= List of Yakshagana plays in the Kannada language =

Yakshagana (lit. "Songs of the demi-gods") is a composite folk-dance-drama or folk theater of southern India which combines literature, music, dance and painting. The best-known forms of this art, written in the Kannada language, are from the Dakshina Kannada, Udupi district, Uttara Kannada and to some extent from the Shimoga district of modern Karnataka. According to the Kannada playwright and Yakshagana researcher Shivarama Karanth, there are over one hundred such plays written in Kannada in the past few centuries though not more than fifty have been staged and gained popularity. The metrical forms used to compose these plays are usually native Kannada forms such as dvipadi (couplet, 2-line verse), caupadi (4-line verse), sangatya (also 4-line) and three or four types of shatpadi (6-line verse). Some Sanskritic metrical forms, such as the vrattas (4 line verse) and kandas (chapter) were also used for composition. The composed lines lend themselves to tala (beats) and are hence suitable for dance-dramas.

There are a variety of dance-dramas collectively termed as Yakshagana. The Yakshagana Tenkutittu (lit. "Yakshagana of the southern style") is popular primarily in the Mangalore region and the Yakshagana Badagatittu Bayalaata (lit. "Yakshagana of northern style performed outdoors") is popular in Udupi and surrounding regions. Other art forms also grouped under Yakshagana are the Nagamandalam, a dance meant to appease the deity Naga, and a variety of bhuta (spirit) dances. The "Yakshagana Tenkutittu" is more akin to the classical Kathakali of Kerala. According to Karanth, the region between Udupi and Ikkeri could be where the Yakshagana of the northern style originated. Based on internal evidence, Karanth dates these plays to about a 100 years prior to their earliest available copy. This list is not exhaustive. Many plays never reached the stage and among those that did, several plays may not have gained popularity or may longer be popular. Aliya Lingaraja, a member of the Mysore royal family and a writer in the Mysore court wrote more than forty plays which are not in this list.

From about the 1960s, the Kannada Yakshaganas of the Tenkutittu style (southern style) have been replaced almost entirely by the Tulu language. According to Muthukumaraswamy and Kaushal this appears to be a form of "protest" against playing the traditional themes in Kannada taken from classical sources and a preference for local folk themes in Tulu language.

== The list ==
Noted Yakshagana plays in the Kannada language
Play	Author	Location	Period	Earliest available copy
Sugriva Vijaya	Kandukuru Rudrakavi		16th century	~1550
Virata Parva	Vishnu Varamballi	Brahmavara	16th century	1564
Banasura Kalaga	Vishnu Varamballi			1683
Indra Kilaka	Vishnu Varamballi			1678
Sambarasura Kalaga	Subramanya Nagire	Gersoppa	16th century	1623
Ravanodbhava	Subramanya Nagire			16th-17th century
Krsna Sandhana	Devidasa	Barkur or Udupi	16th century	1665
Bhisma Parva	Devidasa			1692
Abhimanyu Kalaga	Devidasa			1695
Saindhava Vadha	Devidasa			16th-17th century
Chitrasena Kalaga	Devidasa			1695
Girija Kalyana	Devidasa			16th-17th century
Krsnarjuna Putrakamesti	Devidasa			1618
Indra Kilaka	Devidasa			16th-17th century
Devi Mahatme	Devidasa			16th-17th century
Babhruvahana Kalaga	Devidasa			1647
Sri Krsna Balalila	Devidasa			16th-17th century
Venkatesa Mahatme	Devidasa			16th-17th century
Krsnarjuna Kalaga	Venkata	Pandesvar	16th century	1663
Tamradhavaja Kalaga	Rama	Sivapura	16th century	1691
Putrakamesti	Anonymous			1652
Rukmini Swayamvara	Anonymous			1678
Panchavati	Anonymous			1657
Pattabhisheka	Anonymous			1657
Kumbhakarna Vadha	Anonymous			1652
Sabha Lakshana	Anonymous			1623
Airavata	Anonymous			1646
Kusalava	Anonymous			1735
Krsna Balalila	Anonymous			1652
Putrakamesti	Anonymous			1651
Babhrvahana Kalaga	Anonymous			17th century
Chandravali	Nagappayya	Dvajapura	17th century	1703
Nala Damayanti	Nagappayya			17th-18th century
Ghatotkaca	Nagappayya			17th-18th century
Gayacharitre	Halemakki Rama	Halemakki	17th century	1618
Lava Kusa	Rama Bhatta	Hattiangadi	17th century	17th-18th century
Draupadi Swayamvara	Rama Bhatta			17th-18th century
Atikaya	Rama Bhatta			17th-18th century
Subhadra Kalyana	Rama Bhatta			1716
Druva Charitre	Rama Bhatta			17th-18th century
Rati Kalyana	Rama Bhatta			17th-18th century
Kamsa Vadha	Rama Bhatta			17th-18th century
Billa Habba	Rama Bhatta			17th-18th century
Draupadi Vastrapaharana	Rama Bhatta			17th-18th century
Rajasuya	Rama Bhatta			17th-18th century
Sulochana Charite	Rama Bhatta			17th-18th century
Setu Madhava	Rama Bhatta			17th-18th century
Sesha Garvapaharana	Rama Bhatta			17th-18th century
Girija Vilasa	Rama Bhatta			17th-18th century
Indrajitu Kalaga	Rama Bhatta			17th-18th century
Kanakangi Kalyana	Nityananda Avadhuta	Not Known	17th century	1683
Parijata	Subba Ajapura	Brahmavara	18th century	1698-1715
Rukmini Svayamvara	Subba Ajapura			1698-1715
Mairavana Kalaga	Venkata Ajapura	Brahmavara	18th century	1726
Manasa Charite	Venkanna	Mulki	18th century	1750
Samudra Mathana	Vasudeva Prabhu	Mulki	18th century	18th century
Chandrahasa-Billahabba	Vasudeva Prabhu			1814
Kamsa Vadhe	Vasudeva Prabhu			18th century
Radha Vilasa	Vasudeva Prabhu			18th century
Rajasuya	Bhima	Uttara Kannada	19th century	19th century
Prahalada charite	Mayyavati Venkata	Mangalore	19th century	19th century
Bhisma Parva	Yennemadi Venkataramanayya	Shirali	19th century	19th century
Putrakamesti	Gersoppe Santappayya	Gersoppa	19th century	1850
Karnarjuna Kalaga	Gersoppe Santappayya			1850
Ratnavati Kalyana	Lakshminaranappa	Nandalike	19th century	19th century
Kumara Vijaya	Lakshminaranappa			19th century
Bhisma Vijaya	Narasimha Sastry	Tirthahalli	20th century	20th century
Vidyunmati Kalyana	Narasimha Sastry			20th century
