= Kesthur =

- village
- Location in Karnataka, India Kesthur (India)
- Coordinates: 12.06°N 77.04°E
- Country: India
- State: Karnataka
- District: Chamarajanagar
- Talukas: Yelandur

Government
  - Body: Gram panchayat

Population (2001)
  - Total: 5,739

Languages
  - Official: Kannada
- Time zone: UTC+5:30 (IST)
- ISO 3166 code: IN-KA
- Vehicle registration: KA
- Website: karnataka.gov.in

Kesthur is a village in the southern state of Karnataka, India. It is located in the Yelandur taluk of Chamarajanagar district in Karnataka.

== Demographics ==
As of 2001 India census, Kesthur had a population of 5739 with 2925 males and 2814 females.

== See also ==
- Chamarajanagar
- Districts of Karnataka
