= A. Devarahalli =

- village
- Location in Karnataka, India A. Devarahalli (India)
- Coordinates: 12.900668°N 76.380386°E
- Country: India
- State: Karnataka
- District: Chamarajanagar
- Talukas: Yelandur

Government
  - Type: Panchayat raj
  - Body: Gram panchayat

Languages
  - Official: Kannada
- Time zone: UTC+5:30 (IST)
- ISO 3166 code: IN-KA
- Vehicle registration: KA
- Nearest city: Chamarajanagar
- Civic agency: Village Panchayat
- Website: karnataka.gov.in

A. Devarahalli is a village in the southern state of Karnataka, India. It is located in the Yelandur taluk of Chamarajanagar district in Karnataka.

== See also ==
- Chamarajanagar
- Districts of Karnataka
