= Irasavadi =

Coordinates: 12.014074°N 77.040478°E

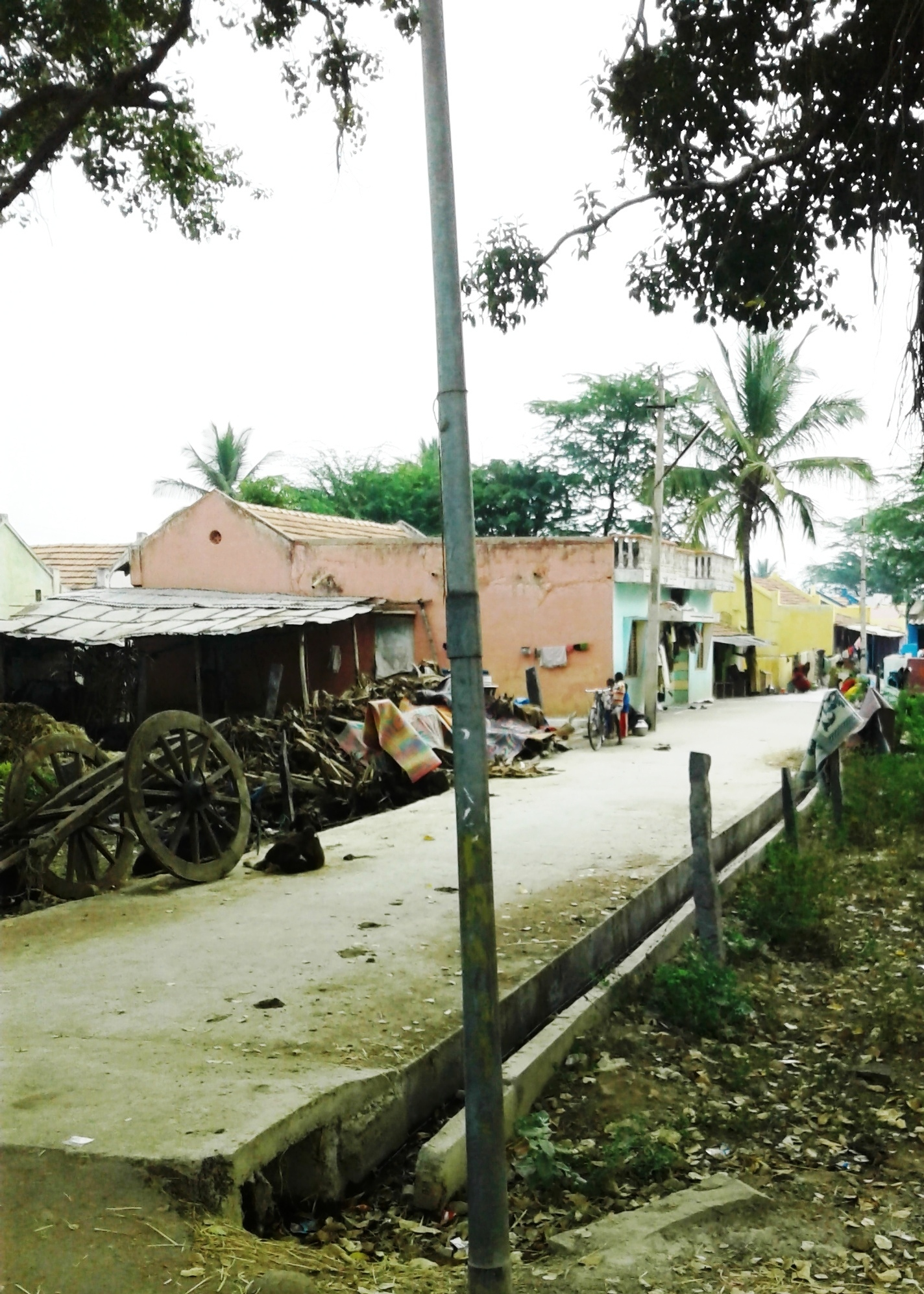
Irasavadi village

Irasavadi is a village in Chamarajanagar district of Karnataka state, India.

== Location ==
Irasavadi village is located between Chamarajanagar town and Yelandur town. The nearby villages are Rechamballi and Kagalvadi.

== Postal code ==
There is a post office at Irasavadi and the pin code is 571441.

== Geography ==
The terrain is generally flat and there is a lake called Irasavadi Lake

== Economy ==
The village is mostly agrarian. There is a branch of Indian Overseas Bank at Kagalvadi.

== Access ==
The village is 16 km from Chamarajanagar, the district headquarters. Bangalore is 143 km away.

== Nearby villages ==
Suthur, 2 km Boodamballi, 2 km Yeragamballi, 2 km Honganuru, 3 km Duyamkandalli, 3 km

== See also ==
- Rechamballi
- Kagalvadi
- Yelandur
- Chamarajanagar
