= Gaurishvara Temple, Yelandur =

Hindu temple in Karnataka state, India

Gaurishvara Temple
- Hindu temple
- View of the Mahadwara, Gaurishvara temple (1500 AD)
- Interactive map of Gaurishvara Temple
- Country: India
- State: Karnataka
- District: Chamarajanagar District

Languages
  - Official: Kannada
- Time zone: UTC+5:30 (IST)

The Gaurishvara Temple (also spelled Gaurishwara or Gaurisvara) is located in the town of Yelandur, Chamarajanagar district of Karnataka state, India. The temple was constructed by a local chief Singedepa Devabhupala of the Hadinadu chiefdom, a feudatory of the 16th century Vijayanagara Empire.

== Architectural features ==
The temple plan is simple. It has a sanctum (garbhagriha), a closed hall (mantapa), an open hall supported by granite pillars, and an unusual mahadwara (grand entrance) which lacks the usual tower (gopuram) over it. This type of an entrance is called bale mantapa (lit, bangled hall) in a contemporary style. The sanctum contains the linga, the universal symbol of the Hindu god Shiva. The closed hall has images of various Hindu deities; Vishnu, Shanmukha, Parvati, Mahishasuramardini (a form of the goddess Durga), Bhairava (a form of the god Shiva), Durga, Virabhadra (another form of Shiva) and Ganapati. The walls of the entrance are heavily decorated with reliefs depicting scenes from the puranic stories and the epics. An unusual decoration provided to the entrance are the chains of stone rings (bale).

== Gallery ==
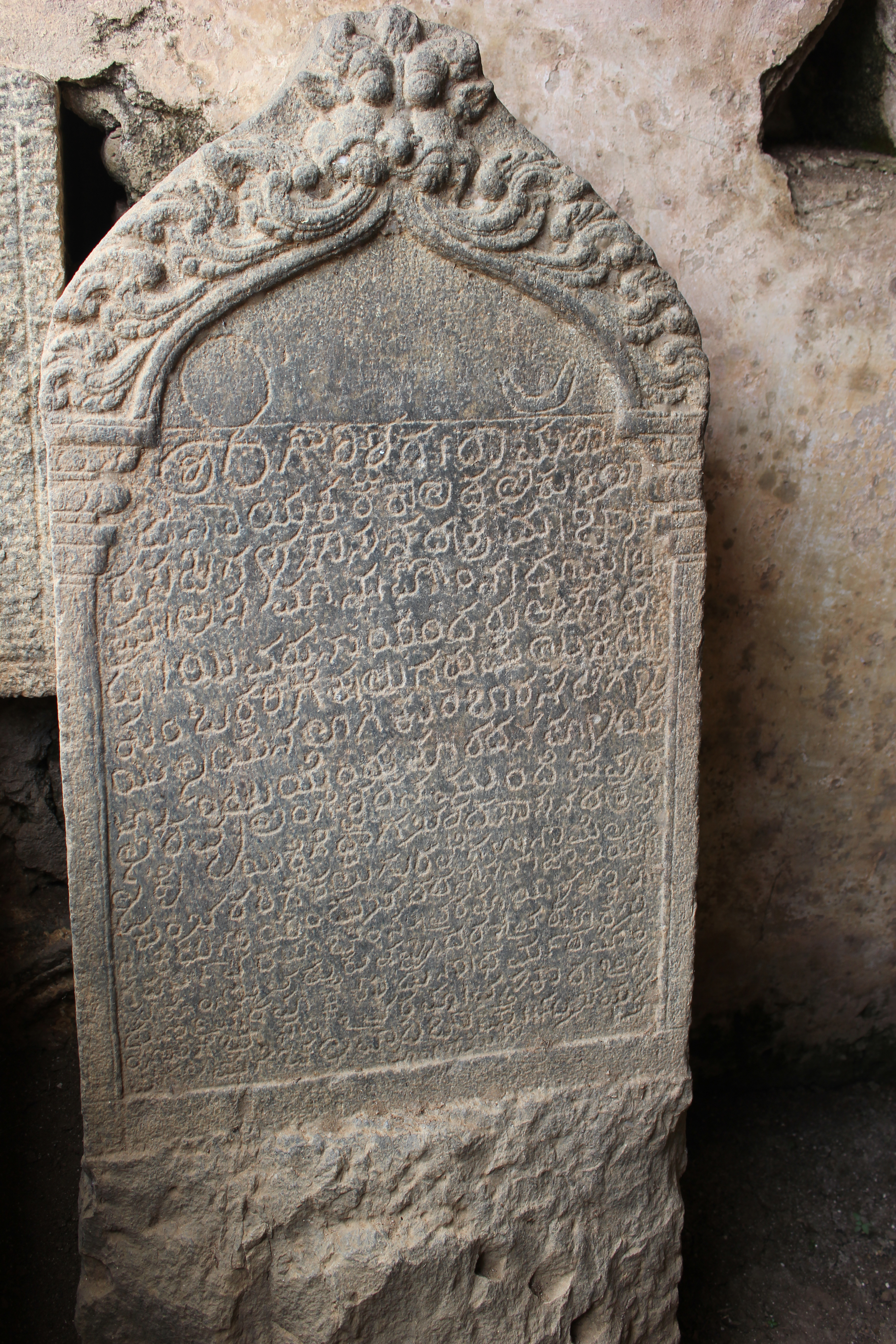
17th-century Kannada inscription at Gaurishvara temple

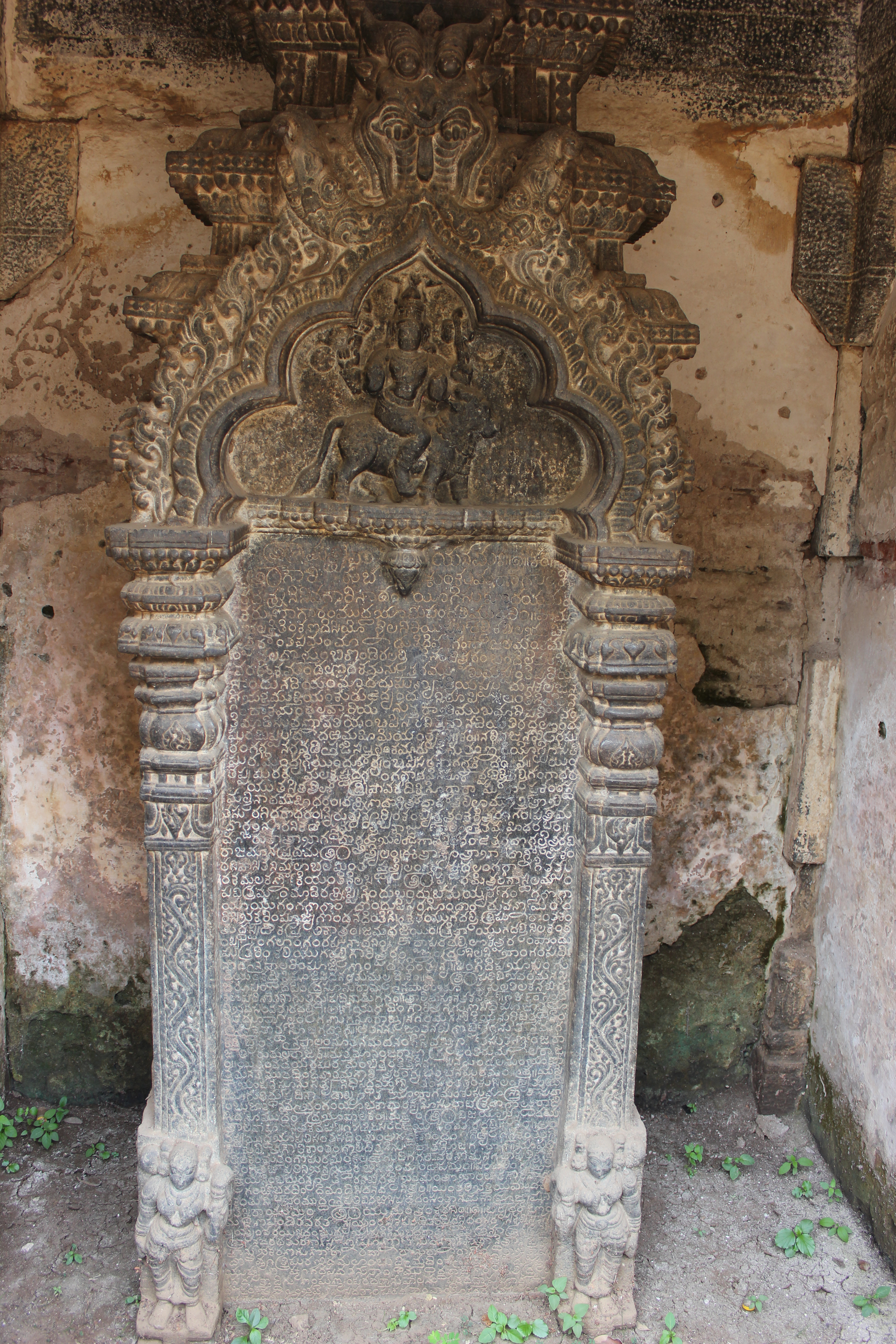
17th-century Kannada inscription at the Gaurishvara temple

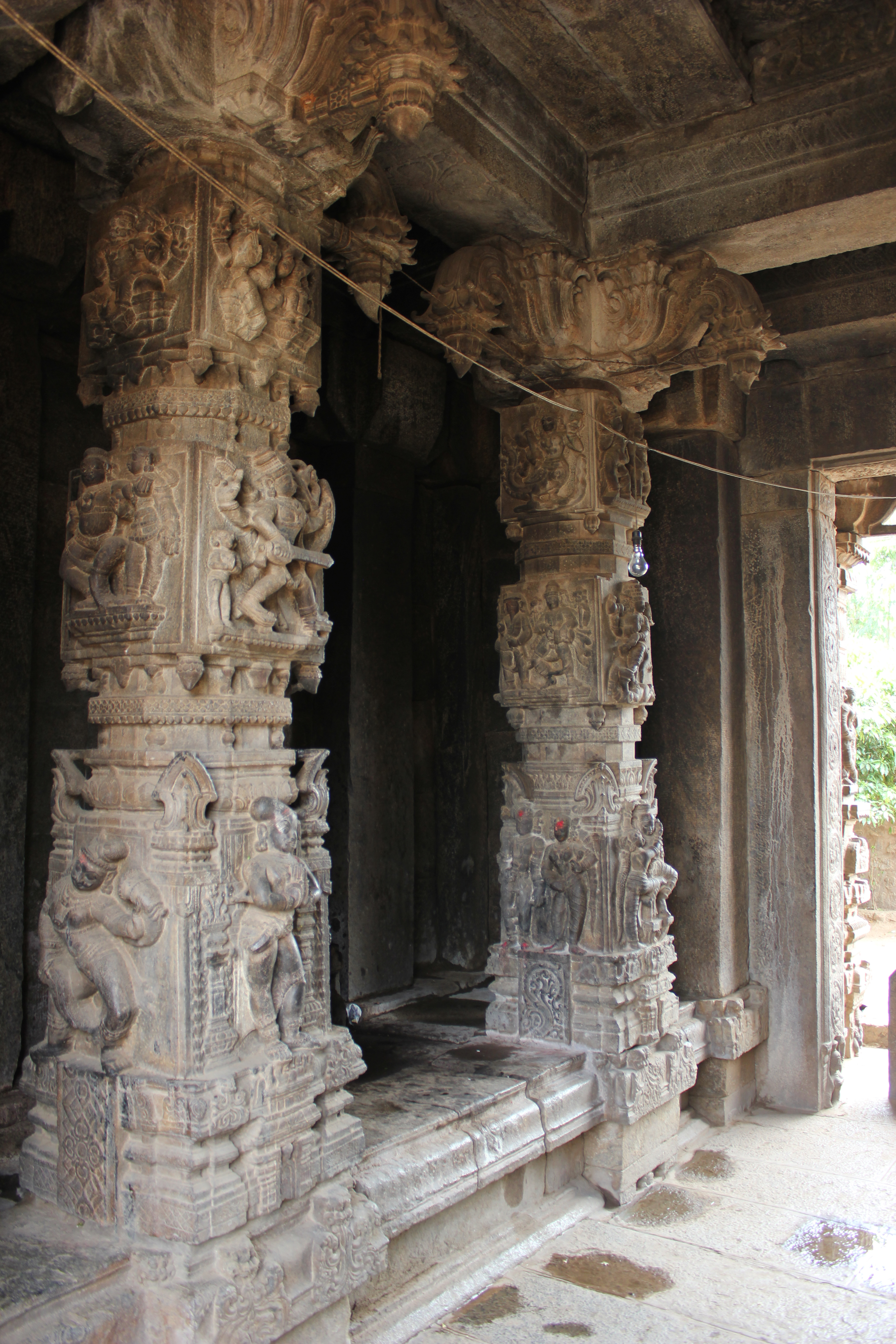
Ornate pillars inside the bale mantapa (lit, bangled hall)

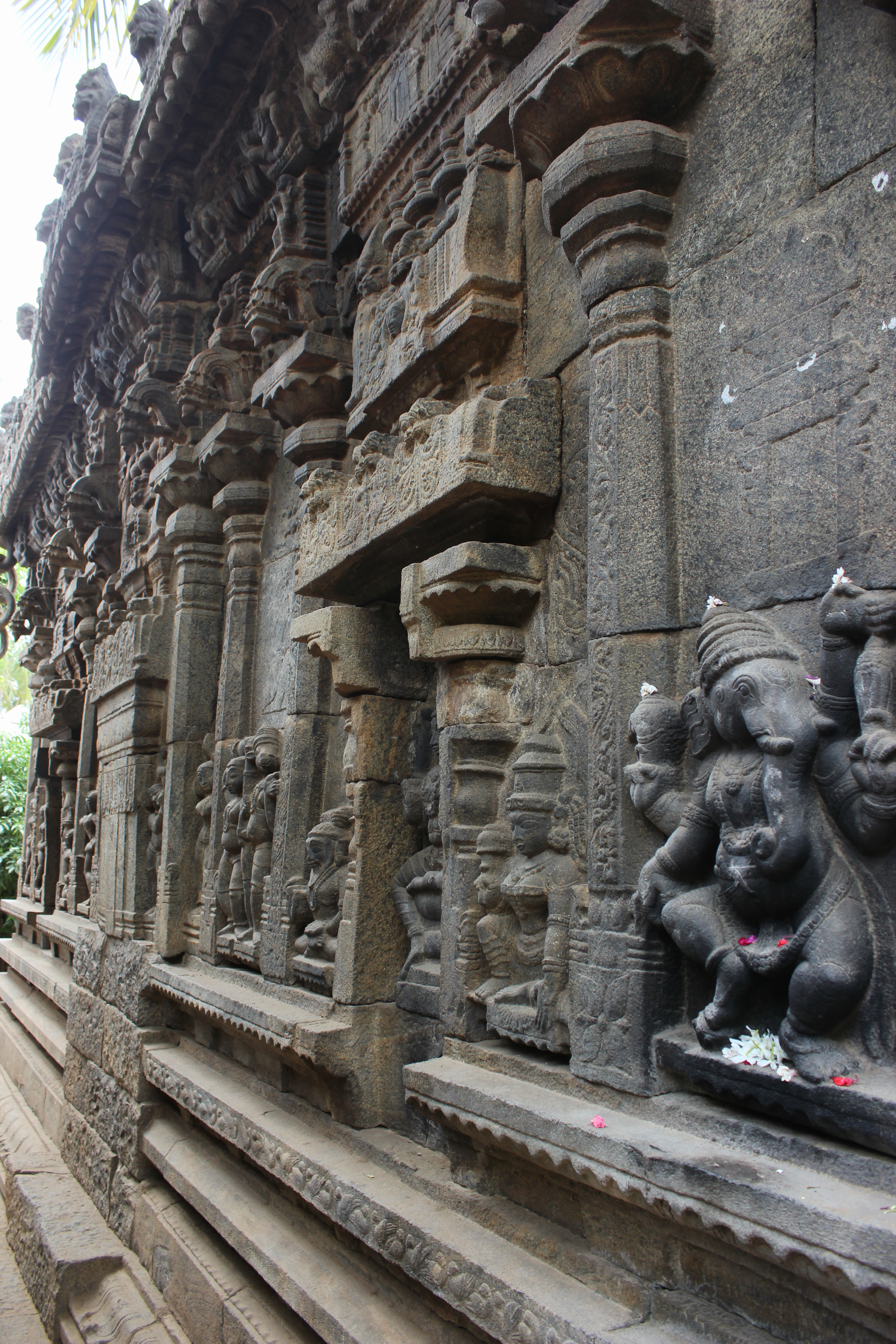
Wall relief sculpture at the Gaurishvara temple

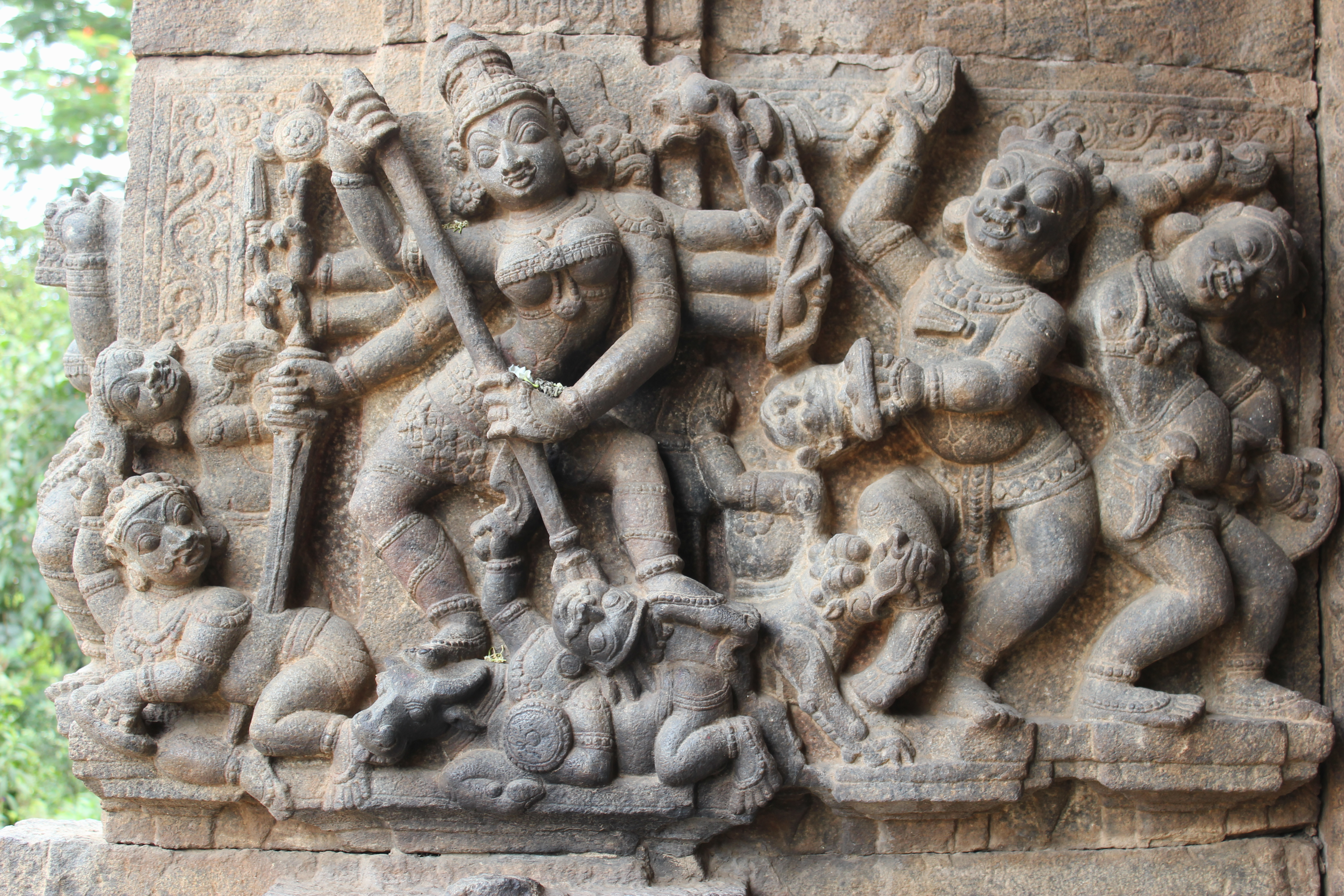
Wall relief sculpture at the Gaurishvara temple
