= Mysore literature in Kannada =

Body of literature in India

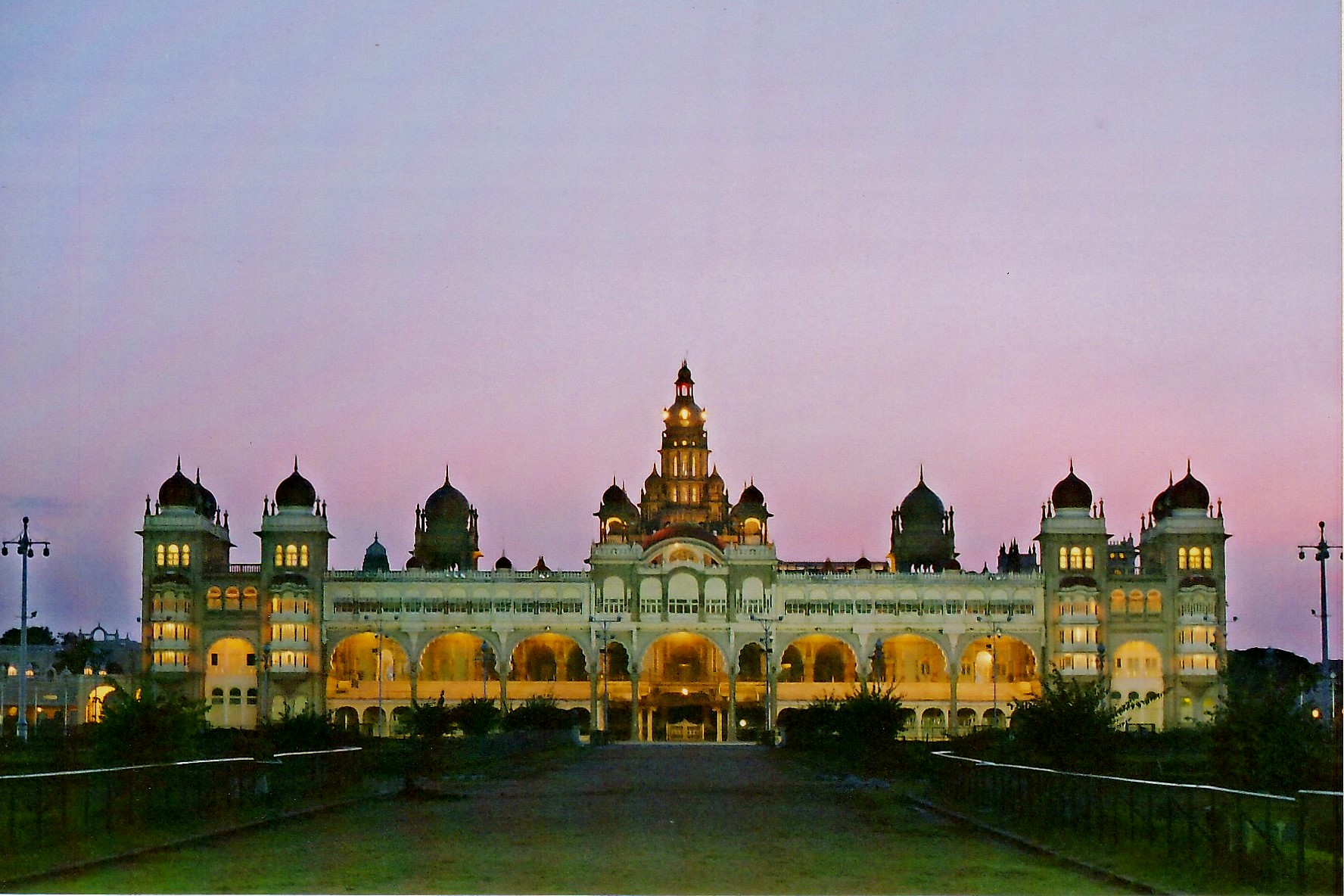
Mysore Palace, completed in 1912, currently holds the royal archives which has a huge collection of records regarding composers under royal patronage, covering a period of over 100 years.

Mysore, during various periods

Mysore literature in Kannada is a body of literature composed in the Kannada language in the historical Kingdom of Mysore in Southern India. The Kingdom of Mysore began as a vassal state of the Vijayanagara empire, under the rule of Yaduraya Wodeyar. In approximately the 16th century, after the rule of the Tuluva dynasty of Vijayangara began to lose its hold, Timmaraja Wodeyar II broke away from Vijayanagara. In the 18th century, Hyder Ali became the Sultan of Mysore after wresting power from Nanjaraja Odeyar, the son and sarvādhikāri of Krishnaraja Wodeyar II. After the British defeated Tipu Sultan in 1799, the Kingdom of Mysore was re-established under the Wodeyars, though under the close watch of the East India Company's officials. The succession of different rulers with various religion-cultural and linguistic affinities contributed to the multifaceted character of Mysore literature. Well into the colonial period, Mysore literature was a predominantly courtly enterprise, composed by palace scholars with various interests and linguistic competencies. Languages of the court included not only Kannada and Sanskrit, but Urdu and Telugu at various points.

A large number of works in Mysore deal with narratives and themes from local Vīraśaiva or Vaiṣṇava traditions. While the Mysore Wodeyars were avowed Śrīvaiṣṇavas, they patronized Śaiva, Jaina, and other Vaiṣṇava poets as well. Works dealing with secular topics were also part of this corpus. Kannada literature patronized by the neighboring Nayakas of Keladi later contributed to the traditions of Mysore, after their kingdom was annexed by Mysore in 1763.

During an age of revival and innovation, some Mysore court poets brought back the classical champu (a composition in prose-verse), a form of writing that had prevailed in Kannada prior to the 13th century, and initiated writings on contemporary history. Yakshagana, a native form of dramatic literature meant for a rustic audience, consolidated in the coastal and malnad (hill) regions in the 16th century and gained popularity thereafter, and spread to Mysore and Yelandur. The literature of the itinerant Haridasas, popular in the 15th and 16th century, was revived in the 18th and 19th century, and had a strong influence on devotionalism in the Kannada speaking regions. The vachana poetic tradition was repopularised by some poets while others wrote anthologies and doctrines based on the 12th century Veerashaiva canon. Social developments in the 19th century brought the influence of English literature and classical Sanskrit literature, resulting in the birth of modern prose, prose narrative and theatrical literature.

The men of letters in the Mysore royal court included not only the court poets, who were often quite prolific, but also on occasion the rulers themselves. In the post Vijayanagara Empire period, a new kind of lyrical poetry, one unaffiliated with the royal court, and written by maverick-poets was gaining popularity. A wide range of metres, indigenous and Sanskritic, were popular including tripadi (3-line verse), shatpadi (6-line verse) and saptapadi (7-line verse) metres, and gadya (prose).

== Pre-16th century literature ==
Trends in Kannada literature (mid-16th–20th century)
Developments	Date
Birth of the Yakshagana play	1565–1620 CE
Dominance of Vaishnava and Veerashaiva literature	17th–20th century CE
Historicals and Biographies. Revival of classical Champu. Revival of Vachana poetry. Veerashaiva anthologies and commentaries. Age of Sarvajna and Lakshmisa. Vaishnava epics and poems	1600–1700 CE
Writings by Mysore Royalty	1630 onward
Revival of Haridasa literature Popularity of Yakshagana play	1700 CE onward
Birth of Modern literature	1820–1900 CE

By the mid-16th century, Kannada literature had been influenced by three important socio-religious developments: Jainism (9th–12th centuries), Veerashaivism (devotion to the god Shiva, from the 12th century), and Vaishnavism (devotion to the god Vishnu, from the 15th century). In addition, writings on secular subjects remained popular throughout this period.

Jain works were written in the classical champu metre and were centred on the lives of Tirthankars (saints), princes and personages associated with the Jainism. The early Veerashaiva literature (1150–1200 CE), comprising pithy poems called Vachanas (lit. "utterance" or "saying") which propagated devotion to the god Shiva were written mostly as prose-poems, and to a lesser extent in the tripadi metre. From the 13th century, Veerashaiva writers made the saints of the 12th century the protagonists of their writings and established native metres such as the ragale (lyrical compositions in blank verse) and the shatpadi.

The Vaishnava writers of the 15th and early 16th century Vijayanagara Empire consisted of the Brahmin commentators who wrote under royal patronage, and the itinerant Haridasas, saint-poets who spread the philosophy of Madhvacharya using simple Kannada in the form of melodious songs. The Haridasa poets used genres such as the kirthane (compositions based on rhythm and melody), the suladi (rhythm-based) and the ugabhoga (melody-based). Overall, Kannada writings had changed from marga (formal) to desi (vernacular) and become more accessible to the commoner.

== Developments from 16th century ==
=== Court and monastic literature ===
After the decline of the Vijayanagara Empire, the centres of Kannada literary production shifted to the courts of the emerging independent states, at Mysore and Keladi. The Kingdom of Keladi was centred at Keladi and nearby Ikkeri in the modern Shivamogga district. At their peak, their domains included the coastal, hill and some interior regions of modern Karnataka. Writers in the Keladi court authored important works on Veerashaiva doctrine. The Keladi territories and that of smaller chiefs (Palegars) were eventually absorbed into the Kingdom of Mysore by 1763. The unique aspect of the Mysore court was the presence of numerous multi-lingual writers, some of whom were Veerashaivas. They were often adept in Telugu and Sanskrit, in addition to Kannada. The Veerashaiva monasteries that had sprung up in various regions including Mysore, Tumkur, Chitradurga and Bangalore sought to spread their influence beyond the Kannada speaking borders. Sadakshara Deva, a Veerashaiva writer, tried to rejuvenate the classical champu style of writing. The Srivaishnava (a sect of Vaishnavism) writers, who were dominant in the Mysore court, maintained a literary style that was conventional and conservative while proliferating lore and legend. A spurt in Vaishnava writings resulted in new renderings of the epics, the Mahabharata, the Bhagavata and no fewer than three versions of the Ramayana. Prior to the 17th century, information about royal genealogy and achievements had been recorded mostly on versified inscriptions. Beginning with the 17th century, with the consolidation of the feudatory of Mysore into an independent kingdom, historical and biographical writings became popular. A number of such works were penned by the court poets in the 17th and early 18th century, most notably, Tirumalarya II and Chikkupdhyaya. Some of these writings would later serve as valuable research and source material for modern day historians.

=== Folk and didactic literature ===
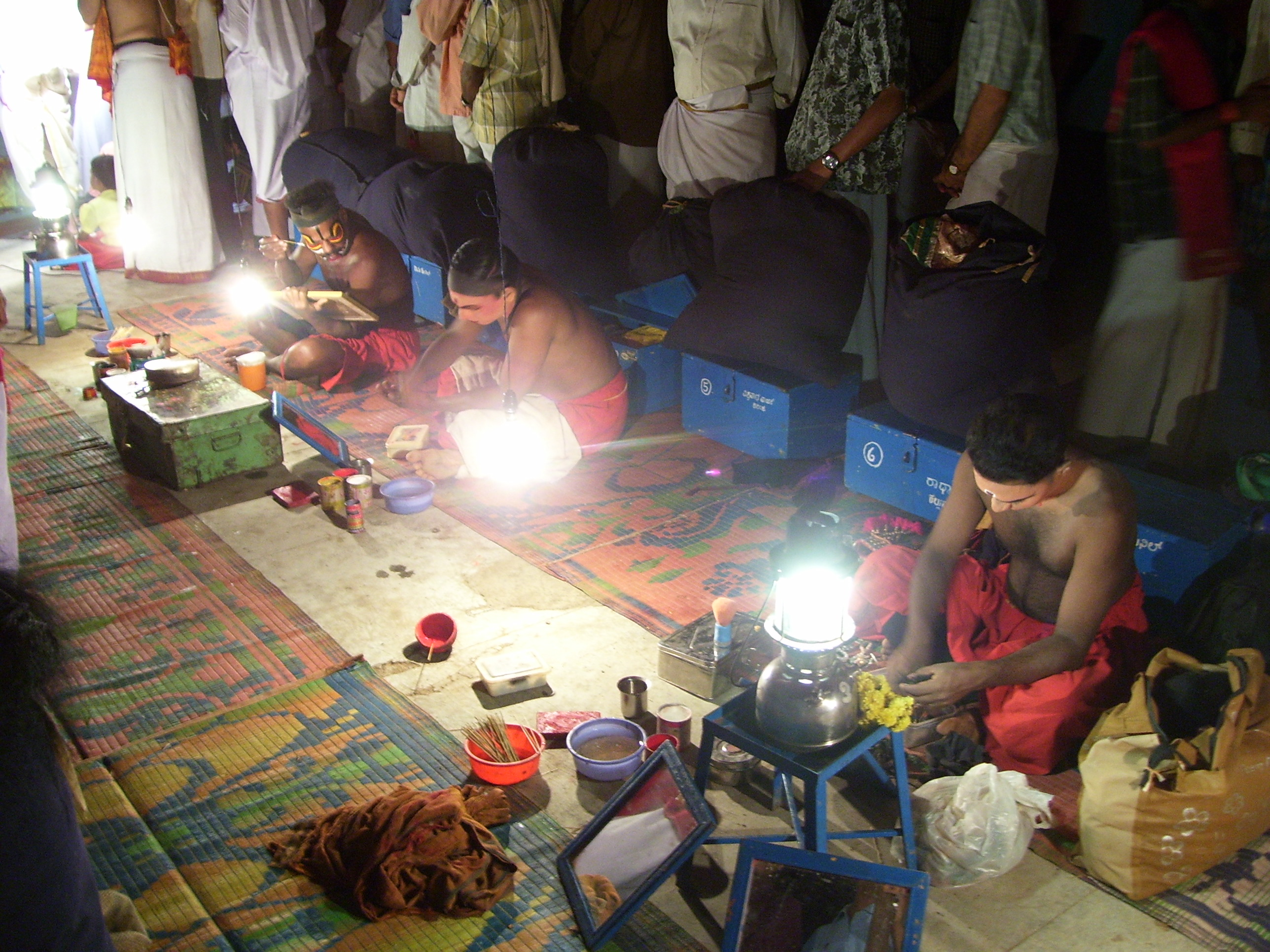
Yakshagana artists applying makeup to prepare for a play

Yakshagana (lit. "Songs of the demi-gods") is a composite folk-dance-drama or folk theatre of southern India which combines literature, music, dance and painting into. The best-known forms of this art are from the Dakshina Kannada, Udupi district, Uttara Kannada and to some extent from the Shimoga district of modern Karnataka. There are a variety of dance-dramas collectively termed as Yakshagana. The Yakshagana Tenkutittu (lit. "Yakshagana of the southern style") is popular primarily in the Mangalore region and the Yakshagana Badagatittu Bayalaata (lit. "Yakshagana of northern style performed outdoors") is popular in Udupi and surrounding regions. Other art forms also grouped under Yakshagana are the Nagamandalam, a dance meant to appease the deity Naga, and a variety of bhuta (spirit) dances. The "Yakshagana Tenkutittu" is more akin to the classical Kathakali of Kerala.

According to modern Kannada writer Shivarama Karanth, the region between Udupi and Ikkeri could be where the Yakshagana of the northern style originated. However, he noted that the earliest forms of dance-drama, called the Gandharagrama, are mentioned in the writing Narada Siska dated to 600–200 BCE. This primitive form developed into "Ekkalagana", a term which appears in the 12th century Kannada writings Mallinathapurana (c. 1105, by Nagachandra) and the Chandraprabha Purana (c. 1189, by Aggala). According to the scholar M.M. Bhat, Chattana, a native composition adaptable to singing and mentioned in Kavirajamarga (c. 850) could be considered the earliest known forerunner of the Kannada Yakshaganas. An epigraph of c. 1565 from Bellary describes a grant to a troupe of Tala-Maddale performers. The earliest available manuscript containing Yakshagana plays is Virata Parva (c. 1565) by Vishnu of Brahmavara in South Kanara, and Sugriva Vijaya (mid-16th century) by Kandukuru Rudrakavi. The earliest available edition of Yakshagana plays, Sabhaparva, is dated to c. 1621.

Haridasa Sahitya, the devotional literature of the Vaishnava saints of Karnataka, flourished in the 15th and 16th centuries under the guidance of such saint-poets as Vyasatirtha, Purandara Dasa ("father of carnatic music") and Kanaka Dasa. This period, according to the scholars M.V. Kamath and V.B. Kher, may be called its "classical period". This literature was revived in the 18th and 19th centuries. According to musicologist Selina Tielemann, the Vaishnava bhakti (devotion) movement, which started with the 6th century Alvars of modern Tamil Nadu and spread northwards, reached its peak influence on South Indian devotionalism with the advent of the Haridasas of Karnataka. The Haridasa poetry, which bears some structural similarities to devotional songs of northern and eastern India, is preserved in written textual form but the musical compositions in which they are rendered have been passed down orally. These songs have remained popular with the members of the Madhva religious order even in the modern age. Vijaya Dasa, Gopala Dasa and Jagannatha Dasa are the most prominent among the saint-poets belonging of the "didactic period". The scholar Mutalik classifies Haridasa devotional songs into the following categories: "biographical, socio-religious, ethical and ritualistic, didactic and philosophical, meditative, narrative and eulogistic and miscellaneous". Their contribution to Hindu mysticism and the bhakti literature is similar to the contributions of the Alvars and Nayanmars of modern Tamil Nadu and that of the devotional saint-poets of Maharashtra and Gujarat. According to the scholar H.S. Shiva Prakash, about 300 saint-poets from this cadre enriched Kannada literature during the 18th–19th century

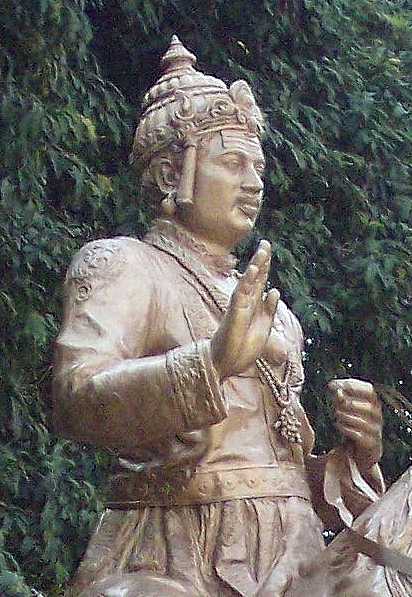
Basavanna, protagonist of many a Veerashaiva writing

After a break of more than three centuries, writing of vachana poems was revived. Though some poets such as Tontada Siddhalingayati (1540), Swatantra Siddhalingeswara (1565), Ganalingideva (1560), Shanmukha Swamy (1700), Kadasiddheswara (1725) and Kadakolu Madivallappa (1780) attempted to re-popularise the tradition with noteworthy pieces, they lacked the mastery of the 12th century social reformers. The most notable of the later day vachanakaras (lit. "Vachana poets") were undoubtedly Sarvajna and Sisunala Sherif (late 18th century). Sarvajna is known to have lived sometime between the mid-16th century and the late 17th century. Though the vachana poetic tradition had come to a temporary halt, the creation of anthologies and commentaries based on the earlier vachana canon, depicting the 12th century Veerashaiva saints as its protagonists, became popular from around c. 1400. Among well-known 16th century anthologists were Channaveeracharya (16th century) and Singalada Siddhabasava (c. 1600) who interpreted the vachanas from a purely philosophical and meta-physical context. In the Keladi court, notable works on doctrine, such as Virasaivadharma siromani ("Crest jewel of the moral order of the Veerashaivas") and Virasaivananda chandrike ("Moonlight to delight the Veerashaivas") were written. A new genre of mystic Kaivalya literature, a synthesis of the Veerashaiva and the Advaitha (monistic) philosophy, consolidated from the 16th century onwards. While the most famous writings are ascribed to Nijaguna Shivayogi (c. 1500), later day writers such as Mahalingaranga (Anubhavamrita in shatpadi metre, c. 1675) and Chidanandavadhuta (Jnana Sindhu) are also notable.

=== Modern literature ===
The birth of modern expression in the Kannada language can be traced to the early 19th century, a transition that in later decades included the influence of English literature on local traditions. The earliest examples of modern literature came in the form of prose, either inspired by or renderings of Sanskrit classics, in the court of King Krishnaraja Wodeyar III. The king himself was an accomplished Kannada writer to whom is ascribed the prose romance Saugandhika Parinaya. Under the patronage of the king, Kempu Narayana wrote Mudramanjusha ("The Seal Casket", 1823), a historical novel and an innovative version of the Sanskrit original, Mudrarakshasa by Vishaka Datta. This work is considered the trailblazer in modern Kannada prose.

English-language education, the role of missionaries, their translation of the Bible into Kannada in 1820, the arrival of the printing press, publication of newspapers and periodicals and the earliest Kannada-English and English-Kannada dictionaries helped to modernise Kannada prose. Development of prose narrative came by way of translations of Christian classics, such as Yatrikana Sanchara (The Pilgrim's Progress, 1847). Dramatic literature got its impetus from translations of Sanskrit and English classics (Shakuntala in 1869; Macbeth, King Lear and Romeo and Juliet). The modern novel, with a reformist outlook, was born in 1892. This milestone was followed by the earliest social plays with similar themes, a trend that had already set roots in the modern literature of Marathi and Bengali languages. Muddanna (or Nandalike Lakshminarayana) stands out as a unique writer, whose language is Old-Kannada but whose sensibilities are modern. His two important works were Adbhuta Ramayana (1895) and Ramaswamedham (1898). The latter work is historically important to prose development – ancient epic is handled from a modern viewpoint. The narrator is the author and the listener his wife. Muddanna's declaration Padyam Vadhyam, Gadyam Hridyam (lit. "Poetry deserves killing whereas prose reaches the heart") summarises the trends in Kannada literature in the late 19th century.

== 17th century writings ==
Noted Kannada poets and writers (1600-1700 CE)
Tirumalarya I	1600
Chamaraja Wodeyar VI	1630
Narasaraja Wodeyar	1650
Govinda Vaidya	1648
Nanjakavi	17th c.
Shantaveera Deshika	1650
Bhaskara	17th c.
Timmarasa	1650
Mallikarjuna	17th c.
Channarya	17th c.
Chamaiah	1700
Chikka Devaraja Wodeyar	1690
Tirumalarya II	1698
Chikkupadhyaya	1679
Lakshmanacharya	17th c.
Chidananda	1675
Singaraya	1680
Timmakavi	1677
Mallarasa	17th c.
Srirangamma	1685
Sanchi Honnamma	17th c.
Lakshmisa	17th c.
Ramachandra	17th c.
Tirumalevaidya	1650
Nagarasa	17th c.
Bhattakalanka Deva	1604
Padmana Pandita	17th c.
Chandrashekara	17th c.
Sarvajna	17th c.
Shadaksharadeva	1655
Harisvara	17th c.
Siddhananjesa,	17th c.
Prasabhushana	17th c.
Mummadi Tamma	17th c.
Parvatesvara	17th c.
Sejjeya Siddhalingaraya	17th c.

=== Transition from Vijayanagara ===
With the waning of the Vijayanagara Empire, Raja Wodeyar I (r. 1578–1617) became the first ruler of political importance at Mysore, having ousted the Vijayanagara governor at Srirangapatna. However, the fledgling kingdom still owed nominal allegiance to the diminished empire. The foundation of an independent state that would influence regional polity and culture was laid in this period. In the following decades, the Mysore court became the inheritor of the Vijayanagara literary legacy and a centre for textual production not only in Kannada, the native language, but to some extent, even in Telugu and Sanskrit. The earliest available Kannada language writings from the Mysore court are by Tirumalarya I (or Tirumala Iyengar), Raja Wodeyar I's court poet. He composed the Karna Vrittanta Kathe (c. 1600) in sangatya metre, a composition rendered to the accompaniment of an instrument. Raja Wodeyar I's grandson, Chamaraja VI (r. 1617–1637), is the earliest among the Mysore kings known for their personal contribution to the fine arts. The king wrote Chamarajokti Vilasa, a translation of the Sanskrit Ramayana, in the Valmiki tradition.

During the rule of King Kanthirava Narasaraja Wodeyar I (r. 1637–1659), the kingdom attained complete freedom, as evidenced from the issue of gold coins called phanams, similar to ones issued by the Vijayanagara empire. This event was followed by a period of political expansion within modern southern Karnataka and a successful military encounter against the invading Mughal commander Ranadullah Khan. Govinda Vaidya, the most well-known poet in the royal court, wrote Kanthirava Narasaraja Vijaya (1648) in sangatya metre. In this eulogy, written in 26 chapters, Vaidya compares his patron king to "God Narasimha" (an avatar of the Hindu god Vishnu). The writing also gives useful details about the kingdom, its social events, urban life, the king's court, the types of music composed by the court musicians and the instruments they used to render them. During this time, Bhattakalanka Deva, a Jain writer from Haduvalli in South Kanara excelled as a grammarian of extraordinary talent. He was the last of the three notables who wrote comprehensively on Old-Kannada grammar (Nagavarma II and Keshiraja being the other two). He was an expert in Sanskrit grammar as well. His extant Kannada grammar, Karnataka Sabdanusasanam, containing 592 Sanskrit sutras (a literary form written for concision) with vritti (glossary) and vyakhya (commentary), is written in four padas (chapters) and makes useful references to contemporary and earlier writers. His work is modelled after that of earlier Sanskrit grammarians, Panini, Pujyapada and others, and is considered an exhaustive work. The author's emphasis on the importance of Kannada language and its rich literary and poetic history is evident and was meant to be a rebuttal to the attitude shown by contemporary Sanskrit scholars towards Kannada language.

Shadaksharadeva, who attempted to revive the classical (Sanskritised) champu metre, belonged to the Pampa tradition. A Veerashaiva by faith and the head of the Yelandur monastery, he was under the patronage of the Mysore court. A bilingual writer in Sanskrit and Kannada, his writings propagate his faith in the god Shiva. He wrote three well-known works in Kannada: Rakashekara Vilasa (1655), his best-known poetic work, written during his early days, has love as the main theme and rivals the poems in Lakshmisa's Jaimini Bharata (17th century). It is derived from a well-known devotional Tamil story of Satyendra Chola and is known to be based on an earlier work, Bhavachintaratna (c. 1513), by Kannada writer Gubbi Mallanarya of Vijayanagara. In a noteworthy piece of elegiac poetry, the poet describes the lamentation of a mother in his own inimitable style. Upon hearing the news of her son's death by trampling under the hooves of Prince Rajashekara's horse, the mother rushes to the scene, and mourns, holding the body of her son in her lap. Vrishabhendra Vijaya (1671), a poem of epic proportions, written in forty-two cantos and 4,000 stanzas, is an account of the 12th century reformer Basavanna. Sabarasankara Vilasa is a poem in five cantos narrating a popular tale of the battle between the god Shiva and the Pandava prince Arjuna. To test Arjuna's devotion to him, Shiva disguises himself as a hunter and fights a fierce battle with Arjuna. Toward the end, impressed with Arjuna's devotion, Shiva bestows on him a weapon called Pashuptastra.

Other notable Kannada writers in the court of Kanthirava Narasaraja I (r. 1637–1659) were Shantaveera Deshika (Shivaganga Charitra in sangatya metre, 1650), Bhaskara (Beharaganita, on mathematics, early 17th century), Nanjakavi (Kanthirava Narasaraja Charitra, a historical, early 17th century) and Timmarasa (Markandeya Ramayana, the story of the god Rama which forms an episode in the forest section of the epic Mahabharata, c. 1650). Chamaiah, a court poet, wrote an account of his patron, King Dodda Devaraja Wodeyar (r. 1659–1673) in Devarajendra Sangatya (late 17th century), and Channarya wrote a metrical history of the same king in Devaraja Vijaya (late 17th century). Tirumalabhatta, a court poet of the Keladi ruler Hiriya Venkatappa Nayaka (r. 1586–1629) wrote the poem Shivagita.

=== Golden age ===
The reign of King Chikka Devaraja Wodeyar (r. 1673–1704) is a high point in the early history of the Kingdom of Mysore. The king, an able warrior known to have defeated even the Marathas on occasion, held the upper hand against the Nizam of Golconda and brought the Keladi territories under his domain by 1682. An able administrator, the king was inclined towards the Srivaishnava faith. His reign produced numerous prolific writers, not the least the king himself – he was an accomplished scholar in Kannada and a composer of music. A well-known treatise on music called Geeta Gopala, written in opera style and in the saptapadi metre, is credited to him. Though inspired by Jayadeva's Geeta Govinda (c. 1200), it had an originality of its own. The work differs from the original in that the god Krishna and his Gopikas are the protagonists of the play instead of Krishna and his consort Radha. The writing consists of fourteen sections, with seven songs in each section. It is considered an asset to students of music and literature. The king's other works are commentaries on the Bhagavata and the later chapters of the epic Mahabharata, a collection of devotional poems written in thirty verses (Chikkadevaraya binappa, "Kings Petition") and composed in praise of the god Cheluva Narayanaswamy of Melkote.

Tirumalarya II, a native of Srirangapatna and a descendant of Tirumalarya I, was held in high esteem in the Mysore court. A childhood friend of the King Chikka Devaraja, he served as his minister. Tirumalarya II authored five notable writings: Chikka Devaraja Saptapadi (saptapadi metre, 1698), an important musical treatise rendered in seven sections comprising fifty-two songs which exalts the patron king to the level of "God on Earth"; Apratimavira Charite ("History of the Peerless Hero"), a rhetorical eulogy of the king and a treatise on poetics; Chikkadevaraja Vijaya, an account of the king's conquests, his life and his ancestors, in the champu metre comprising six chapters; Chikkadevaraya Yaso-bhushana; and the prose piece Chikkadevaraja Vamshavali, one of the earliest available contemporary historicals in Kannada language describing the king's ancestry. In addition, Tirumalarya II composed seventy songs, most of which are in Kannada and a few in Telugu.

Minister Chikkupadhyaya (or Lakshmipathi), a native of Terakanambi town in Mysore district was a zealous Srivaishnava and one of the most prolific Kannada writers of his time. To his credit are over thirty works, mostly in the sangatya and champu metres, and gadya (prose). His best-known works are Vishnupurana (prose and champu versions, 1691); Divya Suri Charitre, a history of the twelve Alvar saints; Artha Panchaka ("Five truths"), on saint Pillai Lokacharya; a commentary on Tiruvayimole of saint Nammalvar; Kamalachala Mahatmya (1680); Hastigiri Mahatmya (1679); Rukmangada Charite (1681); Satvikabrahma-Vidya-Vilasa, treating on the Visishtadvaita philosophy; Yadugiri Mahatmya, a eulogy of saint Kadambi Srirangacharya; Yadavagiri Mahatmya, a eulogy of saint Kadambi Lakshmanacharya; and a collection of seventy songs called Shringarada Hadugalu in praise of his patron Chikka Devaraja (pen-name "Chikkadevaraja").

Lakshmisa, a superb story-teller, a dramatist and a Vaishnava by faith, is one of the most well-known writers of kavyas (narrative poems). Kannada scholar H.S. Shiva Prakash opines he lived in the mid-16th century, but R. Narasimhacharya and historian Nilakanta Sastri claim he was active in the late 17th century, probably during the rule of King Chikka Devaraja. His Jaimini Bharata, written in shatpadi metre, is the poet's Kannada version of the Hindu epic Mahabharata and is one of the most popular poems of the late medieval age. A collection of stories, the epic poem contains the famous tale of the Sita Parityaga ("Repudiation of Sita"). The author has succeeded in converting a religious story into a very human tale, making it popular even in modern times. For his deft usage of the language, the poet earned the honorific Upamalola (lit. "One of revels in similes and metaphors").

Singaraya, a brother of Tirumalarya II, wrote Mitravinda Govinda (1680), the earliest available classical drama in Kannada. It is a play inspired by the Sanskrit drama Ratnavali ("Pearl necklace") by King Harsha of Kannauj. Among notable women poets, Srirangamma (1685) wrote Padmini Kalyana ("Marriage of Padmini"), and Sanchi Honnamma, a Vokkaliga from Yelandur, wrote Hadibadeya Dharma, on the duties of a faithful wife. This work, which won her many accolades, is in nine sections, containing 479 stanzas, and is written in sangatya metre. Despite being employed as a betel bag bearer and as a maid to Queen Devajammani, she claimed Alasingaraya, a court poet, her Guru. Her work narrates the struggles of women in society, and stresses their need to fulfill their daily roles in family life.

Other writers under the patronage of King Chikka Devaraja were: Chidananda, a Jain poet wrote philosophical compositions called Tatwada Kirtanegalu (1675), Neeti Nrimaya and Munivamsha Bhyudaya in sangatya metre; Vaikunta Dasa (1680), a native of Belur composed kirtanes on the god Vishnu (pen-name "Vaikunta") and songs such as Kapatamata; Timmakavi (Hari Vilasa in sangatya metre and Yadavagiri Mahatmya, 1677); Mallikarjuna (Sriranga Mahatmya, 1678) and Mallarasa (Dasavatara Charite)

Some Brahmin writers worthy of mention from the 17th century are Ramachandra (Asrasastra), Tirumalevaidya (Uttara Ramayana, 1650), Nagarasa of Pandharpur (Bhagavadgite), Timmarasa (Kshetraganita on geometry), and Venkayarya, a Haridasa of Penukonda (Krishnalilabhyudaya). Among Jains, Padmana Pandita (Hayasara Samuchchaya) and Chandrashekara (Ramachandra charitra, story of the Hindu god Rama) are notable. Among Veerashaiva writers, Harisvara (Prabhudeva Purana), Siddhananjesa, (Raghavanka Charitra and Gururaja Charitra), Prasabhushana (or Pemmisetti, Gurubhaktandara Charitre), Mummadi Tamma (Sankara Samhita), Parvatesvara (Chatuacharya Purana) and Sejjeya Siddhalingaraya (Malayaraja Charite) are well known.

=== Age of Sarvajna ===
Noted Kannada poets and writers (1700-1800 CE)
Narasaraja Wodeyar II	1700
Queen Cheluvambe	1720
Timmarya	1708
Puttaiya	1713
Chenniah	18th c.
Kalale Nanjaraja	1720
Nurondiah	1740
Sankara Kavi	18th c.
Payanna	18th c.
Padmaraja	1792
Padmanabha	18th c.
Surala	18th c.
Jayendra	18th c.
Shalyada Krishnaraja	18th c.
Lakshmakavi	1728
Venkatesha	18th c.
Konayya	18th c.
Timmamatya	18th c.
Balavaidya Cheluva	18th c.

A mendicant Veerashaiva poet, a moralist and a drifter whose early days are unclear, Sarvajna (lit. "The all knowing"), has left his indelible mark on Kannada literature and the Kannada-speaking people. He is known to have been a native of either Abbalur or Madagamasuru in the Dharwad district. Based on literary evidence scholars place him variously between the 16th and 18th centuries. Prabhu Prasad of the Sahitya Akademi feels he belonged to the 16th century while Kannada scholars R. Narasimhacharya and H.S. Shiva Prakash claim he lived in the 17th century. To Sarvajna goes the credit of re-vitalising the vachana poetic tradition. His witty and didactic poems, numbering over 2,000, were written using the simple tripadi metre. Some clues in his first fourteen of a series of poems ("Reminiscences of Birth") give an indication about his birth, parentage and his reasons for leaving home at an early age. His poems after the 14th focus on his spiritual quest.

Sarvajna, who is not known to have acquired a formal education, gained knowledge from the world, writing poems impromptu about the nature of people and places. According to the scholar Naikar, Sarvajna was born to "sing the truth and truth alone". His poems cover a vast range of topics, from caste and religion to economics and administration, from arts and crafts to family life and health. People from a broad spectrum of life were commented upon: "Professionals such as priests, astrologers, sorcerers, tax collectors and accountants; artisans such as smiths, carpenters, tailors and potters; and businessmen such as oil men, money-lenders, fishermen and farmers", all have caught the poet's discerning eye. Sarvajna reserved his compliments only for the farmers, weavers, real spiritual seekers and chaste housewives. A tomb in Hirekerur town in the Haveri district is said to be his final resting place. His poems, all of which end with his name "Sarvajna", constitute some of Kannada's most popular works. Sarvajna is to Kannada language what Bhartrhari is to Sanskrit language, Vemana is to Telugu and Thiruvalluvar is to Tamil. Neither was he patronized by royalty nor did he write for fame or money. His main aim was to instruct people about morality with poems such as these:

A begging bowl in hand,

A vast land to wander in
The great god Shiva to guard me

What cause have I to fear, O Sarvajna?

— Sarvajna, Shiva Prakash (1997), pp. 191–192

Even as the tongue manages, surrounded

By the teeth; so should the good

Live among the wicked, Sarvajna.

— Sarvajna, Prasad (1987), p. 3

== 18th century writings ==
=== Proliferation of Yakshagana ===
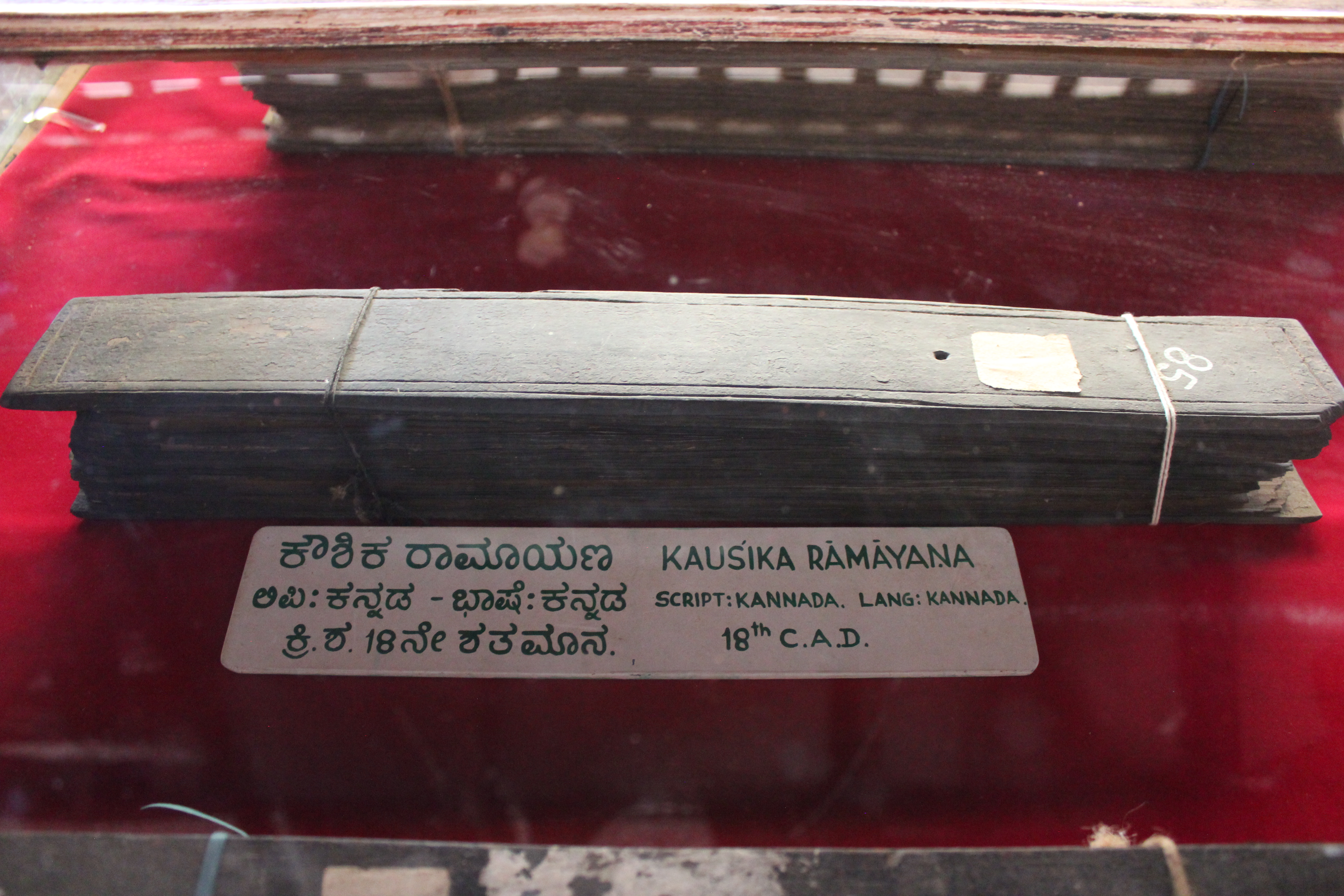
Part of the Kaushika Ramayana of the 18th century

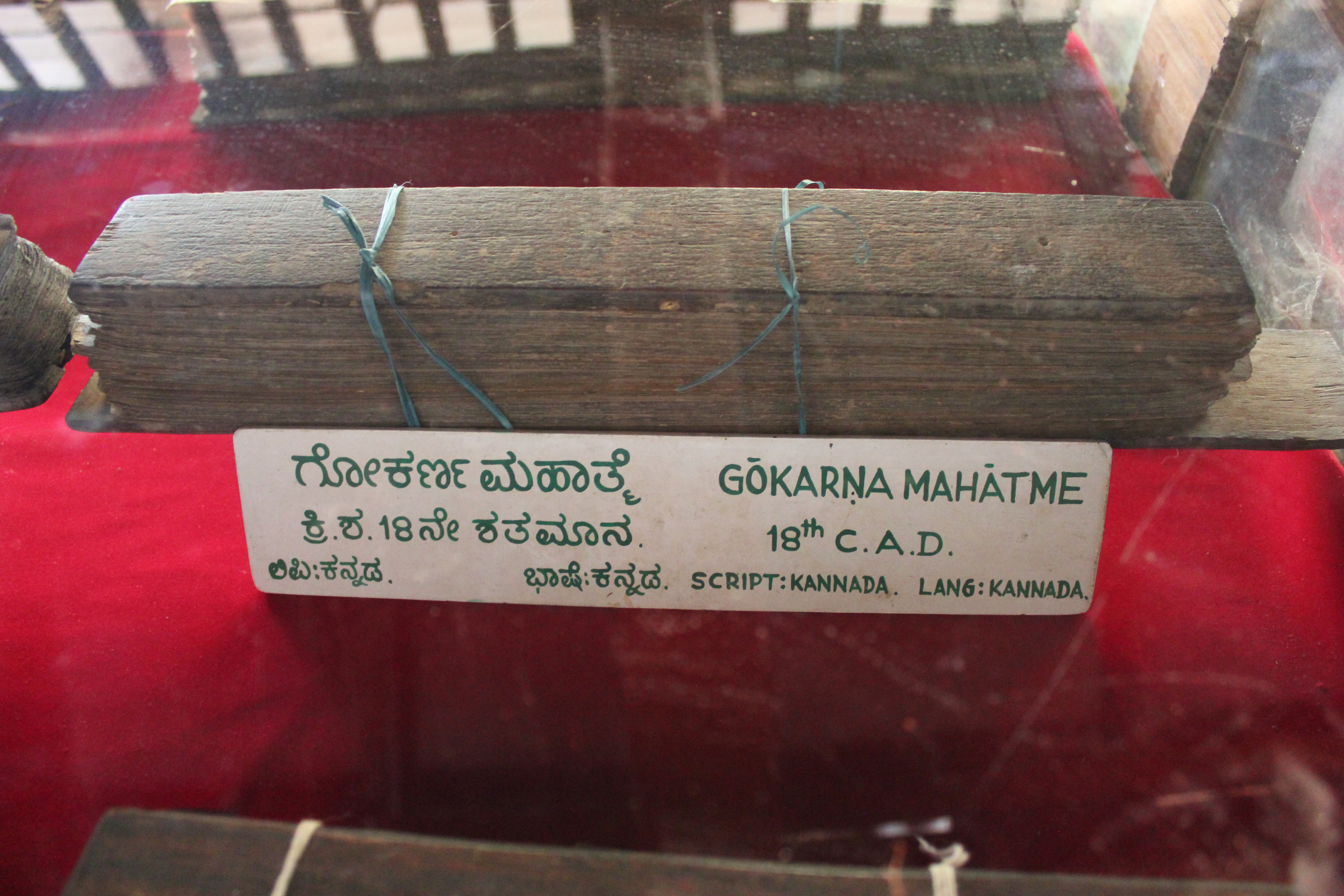
Part of the Kannada epic Gokarna Mahatme of the 18th century

Noted Haridasa poets (Kannada) (1650-1900 CE)
Poet	Dates
Mahapati Dasa	1611–1681
Krishna Dasa (Varaha Timmappa)	18th c.
Vaikunta Dasa	1680
Vijaya Dasa	1687–1755
Gopala Dasa	18th c.
Subbanna Dasa	18th c.
Mohana Dasa	18th c.
Sheshagiri Dasa	18th c.
Prasanna Venkata Dasa	18th c.
Igi Venkatacharya	18th c.
Helavanakatte Giriyamma	18th c.
Venugopaladasa	18th c.
Jagannatha Dasa	1728–1809
Vitthala Dasa	18th c.
Madhva Dasa	18th c.
Pranesha Dasa	19th c.
Prema Dasa	19th c.
Kargagi Dasappa	19th c.

During the first half of the 18th century Mysore's independence was delicately balanced, with the incumbent kings accepting either a nominal subordination or a strategic alliance with the larger power, the Mughals of northern India, by paying tribute while keeping the Marathas (Baji Rao I) of the Deccan Plateau at bay. From the 1830s, the kings also came under the sway of the powerful Dalavoy (or Dalwai, Prime minister) Nanjaraja (or Nanjarajaiah) and Sarvadhikari (Chief minister) Devaraja (or Devarajaiah), the influential Kalale brothers of Nanjangud. During this period, literary contributions were made by some members of the royal family including King Narasaraja Wodeyar II, Nanjaraja and Queen Cheluvambe.

Yakshagana, a rustic form of theatre which draws upon themes from the Hindu epics, the Ramayana, the Mahabharata and the Bhagavata, has an established history in the Kannada speaking region of over 400 years. In its rudimentary form, the script of the play contains prasanga (poetic songs) sung by the bhagavata (musician), to which improvised matu (dialogue) is added. Witty comments are interjected by hasyagaras (clowns). Musical instruments include maddale and chende (types of drums), and a sruti (harmonium-like instrument). The rangasthala (acting arena) could be a temple compound, an open space near the patron's house or a clearing in a paddy field. The Sugriva Vijaya (mid-16th century) by Kandukuru Rudrakavi is one of the earliest available manuscripts of a Yakshagana play. It is based on the story of the ape-like humanoid king Sugriva who overthrew his powerful brother Vali to regain his kingdom in the Hindu epic Ramayana. While scholars such as M.M Bhat, Shivarama Karanth and R.R. Diwakar have proposed various theories about the origin and forerunners of the Yakshagana art, N. Venkata Rao, editor of The Southern school in Telugu literature (1960), gives the credit of writing the earliest available Yakshagana plays that include sangita (music), nataka (drama) and natya (dance) to the polyglot king of Mysore, Narasaraja II (r. 1704–1714). The king was proficient in Kannada, Sanskrit, Telugu, Tamil and Prakrit. His fourteen Yakshagana compositions, written in various languages but in the Kannada script, were discovered at the government manuscripts library in Chennai. By the early 19th century, Yakshagana had become popular in Mysore and nearby Yelandur, where stage troupes were active.

=== Revival of Haridasa literature ===
The Haridasa literature propagates the dvaita (dualistic) philosophy of Madhvacharya. Their compositions have also been of immense value to the development of music and literature in general. While Hari (a form of god Vishnu) is central to their beliefs, their compositions show tolerance to other Vaishnava deities as well. By bringing the values cherished in the Upanishads (scripture) and Vedas (Hindu sacred texts) to the commoner in simple Kannada, these itinerant Haridasas made valuable contributions as "minstrels of God". With the passing of the Vijayanagara era, the creation of the Haridasa literature slowed down for about a century, despite attempts by two dasa (devotee) poets, Mahapati Dasa (1611–1681), who wrote 600 compositions, and his son Krishna Dasa. The tradition however recovered in the early 18th century under the able guidance of Vijaya Dasa (1687–1755), a native of Ceekalaparavi in the Raichur district. Vijaya Dasa was inspired by the establishment of the monastery of saint Raghavendra Swami (of the Madhvacharya order) at Mantralayam town. His lyrical compositions, said to be 25,000 in all, are written in the Purandara Dasa tradition with the pen-name (ankita) "Vijaya Vittala". Most well known among his many disciples is Gopala Dasa who wrote with the pen-name "Gopala Vittala" (1721–1769). Later, Gopala Dasa inspired another famous saint-poet, Jagannatha Dasa, to take to the Haridasa fold.

Jagannatha Dasa (1728–1809) is considered the most notable of the late-18th century Haridasas. Apart from a number of devotional songs, he is credited with two important writings. The Harikathamritasara treats on the philosophy of Madhvacharya. Written in the shatpadi metre with a poetic touch, it contains 32 chapters of 988 stanzas. The Tattva Suvvali, containing 1,200 pithy and proverbial poems written in the tripadi metre, is known to have been a consolation to his widowed daughter. Among women, Helavanakatte Giriyamma (pen-name "Helavanakatte Ranga", early 18th century) and Harapanhally Bhimava (pen-name "Bhimesa Krishna", 1890) are notable despite their humble education and background. Giriyamma authored more than forty songs, and five narrative poems, the best known among which is the devotional piece Chandrahasana Kathe. In a prayer poem about famine, Giriyamma wrote:

Women are taking out in vessels

Water from the well gone dry
While bringing it, they think all day:

O Hari, send the rain to us soon.

— Helavanakatte Giriyamma, Shiva Prakash (1997), p. 201

=== Other writings ===
Cheluvambe, a queen of King Krishnaraja Wodeyar I (r. 1714–1732), was an accomplished Kannada writer. Her notable works include Varanandi Kalyana, written in the sangatya metre. The story narrates the wedding of Varanandi, the daughter of the Badshah (Emperor) of Delhi, and the god Cheluvaraya Swamy of Melkote. In the writing, the author envisioned Varanandi to be a reincarnation of Satyabhama, the consort of the Hindu god Krishna. Her other compositions include Venkatachala Mahatmyam – a lullaby song written in choupadi (4-line verse) metre in devotion to the Hindu god Venkateshwara residing on the Vrishabha hill, songs centred on Alamelu Mangamma, the consort of the Hindu god Venkateshwara of Tirupati, and songs in praise of the god Cheluvanarayana. Shalyada Krishnaraja, a poet and a member from the royal family was proficient writer in Kannada, Telugu and Sanskrit. His contributions to Kannada literature include devotional songs, vachana poems, compositions in sangatya metre (Nija Dipika Ratna), gadya (Anubhava Rasayana), and kirthane compositions (Bhakti Marga Sarovara, Gnana Sarovara and Shalyada Arasinavara Tikina Kirtane).

Nanjaraja was the most noted of the Shaiva writers in the court of King Krishnaraja Wodeyar II (r. 1734–1766). For his literary taste, he earned the honorific "Nutana Bhojaraja", a comparison to the medieval King Bhoja. A native of Kalale town near Nanjangud, Nanjaraja came from an influential family of warriors, statesman and scholars. He was politically active and is known to have created a power centre, holding court in parallel to Krishnaraja II. He was proficient in multiple languages and authored more than twenty writings in Kannada, Sanskrit and Telugu. Among his Kannada writings, Kukudgiri Mahatmya, and a musical composition called Aravattu muvara trivadhi, an account of the life of 63 ancient devotees of the god Shiva, is well known.

Other well-known Shaiva writers were Chenniah, who wrote in the sangatya metre (Padmini Parinaya, 1720), Nuronda, who eulogised his patron Krishnaraja II in Soundarya Kavya (c. 1740) in sangatya metre, and Sankara Kavi (Chorabasava Charitre, 18th century). Linganna Kavi wrote a champu historical piece called Keladinripavijayam in the 1763–1804 period accounting for the chronology and history of the Keladi dynasty. The work also gives useful information about contemporary kingdoms and states including the Nawabs of Savanur, the Marathas and the Mughals. Notable Jain writers of the period were Payanna (Ahimsacharitre), Padmaraja (Pujyapada Charitre, 1792), Padmanabha (Ramachandra Charitre), Surala (Padmavati Charitre), and Jayendra (Karnataka Kuvalayananda). Vaishnava writers who distinguished themselves were Lakshmakavi (Bharata in 1728 and Rukmangada Charite), Venkatesha (Halasya Mahatmya, in champu metre), Konayya (Krishnarjuna Sangara), Timmamatya (Ramabhyudaya Kathakusumamanjari, a version of the epic Ramayana), Timmarya of Anekal (Ananda Ramayana, 1708), Balavaidya Cheluva (Lilavati, and an encyclopedia of precious stones called Ratnasastra), and Puttayia (Maisuru Arasugala Purvabhyudaya, c. 1713, an account of the history of the Kingdom of Mysore).

== 19th century writings ==
=== Age of prose and drama ===
After the death of Tipu Sultan in the fourth Anglo-Mysore war (1799), the British took control of the kingdom. They however restored the Wodeyars in the smaller princely state of Mysore under the paramountcy of the British Raj. The British took direct control of the administration of the kingdom in 1831, after which Maharaja Krishnaraja Wodeyar III devoted all his time to developing the fine arts, earning him the honorific "Abhinava Bhoja" (lit. "Modern Bhoja"). Krishnaraja III (1799–1868) is called the "Morning Star of the Renaissance in Karnataka". A patron of the fine arts, he was an accomplished writer, musician, musicologist and composer. He gave munificent grants to scholars and was a prolific writer himself. Of the over forty writings attributed to him, a prose romance called Saugandhika Parinaya, in two versions (a sangatya composition and a play) is best known. In this writing, the author imaginatively narrates the story of the sage Durvasa who curses Devendra (the Hindu god Indra) to be born as Sucharitra, the son of King Sugandharaya of Ratnapuri. Devendra's wife Shachidevi takes birth as Sougandhika and marries Sucharitra. Apart from composing many devotional songs to his deity, the Hindu goddess Chamundeshwari (pen-name "Chamundi"), he authored three noteworthy treatises: Sri Tatwanidhi and Swara Chudamani (on music) in Sanskrit language and Kannada script, and Sara Sangraha Bharata (on dance and music), dealing with tala (rhythm) in the Kannada language.

Aliya Lingaraja Urs, a native of Heggadadevanakote and a son-in-law (Aliya) of Maharaja Krishnaraja III was a prolific writer with over fifty works spanning various genres: devotional songs, musical compositions, kavya (classical poems), over thirty Yakshagana plays, and other dramas. The author used multiple pen-names including, "lingaraja" and "linganripa". For his contributions to the fine arts, he earned the title Ubhaya Kavita Visharada (lit. "Master of poetry in two languages" – Kannada and Sanskrit). Among his best-known Kannada works are the poem Prabhavati Parinaya and the two versions of the classical epic Girija Kalyana ("Marriage of the mountain born goddess"), in Yakshagana style and in sangatya metre. The writing gives an account of the Girija, the daughter of Himavanta, her youthful days and her successful penance which resulted in her marriage to the Hindu god Shiva. Yadava, also a court-poet, penned two prose pieces, Kalavati Parinaya (1815) in the dandaka vritta (blank verse) metre and Vachana Kadambari, a prose rendering of the classical Sanskrit original by poet Bana.

The Jain poet Devachandra (1770–1841), a native of Kankagiri, was in the court of Krishnaraja III and authored three noted works: Pujyapada Charite, a poem on the life of the Jain saint Pujyapada in sangatya metre; Ramakathavatara, the poet's Jain version of the Hindu epic Ramayana in champu metre; and Rajavalikathe (1838), a biographical account of the Mysore royal family, some earlier poets, and stories of religious importance. Another Jain writer of merit was Chandrasagaravarni, author of Kadambapurana and other works. Devalapurada Nanjunda of Nanjangud, a mere court attendant, rose to the level of a court poet for his scholarship in Kannada and Sanskrit. Among his many compositions, Sougandhika Parinaya in sangatya metre, Samudra Mathana Kathe (a Yakshagana play), Sri Krishna Sarvabhoumara Charitre in sangatya metre, and Krishnendra Gite in choupadi metre are well known. He earned the honorific Ubhaya Bhasha Kavi ("Poet of two languages"). Modern Kannada prose saw its nascent beginning in 1823 with Mudra Manjusha ("Seal Casket"). It is an elaboration of a play summarised in the Sanskrit original, Mudra Rakshasa by Vishakadatta, and was written by Kempu Narayana, a court poet of Maharaja Krishnaraja III.

=== External influences ===
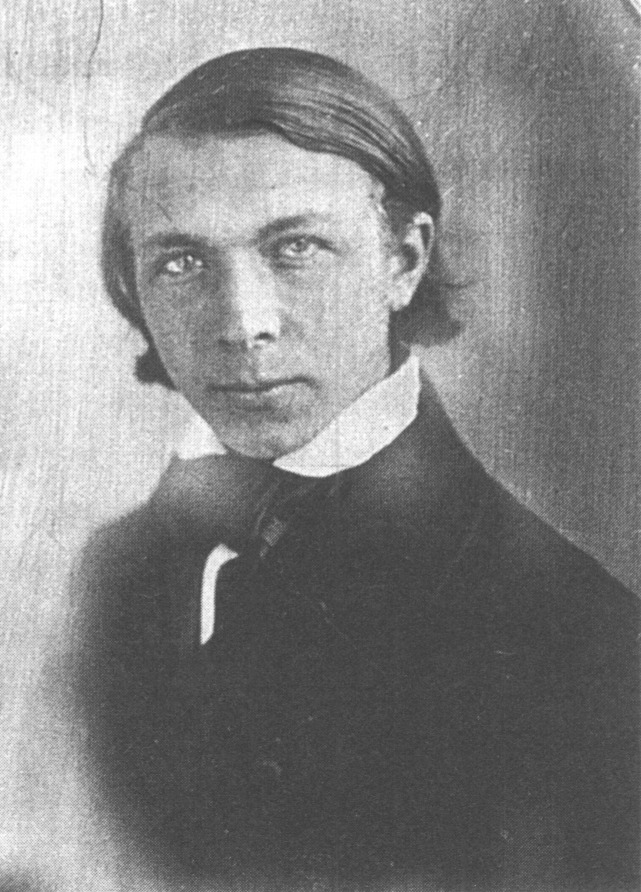
Ferdinand Kittel (1854)

Eager to spread their gospel in Kannada, Christian missionaries took to the Kannada language. The establishment of the printing press and English language education had a positive effect on Kannada prose. Periodicals and newspapers were published for the first time. The first Kannada language book was printed in 1817 and the first Bible in 1820. Grammar books and dictionaries, meant to help the missionaries in their effort in spreading Christianity, became available. Rev. W. Reeve compiled the earliest English-Kannada dictionary in 1824 followed by a Kannada-English dictionary in 1832, though the best-known work is an 1894 publication by Rev. Ferdinand Kittel. Rev. William Carrey published the earliest Kannada grammar in 1817. The influence of English literature and poetry on Kannada was evident from the numerous songs of prayer composed by the missionaries. British officers Lewis Rice and John Faithfull Fleet deciphered numerous Kannada inscriptions. Rice published several ancient classics and a brief history of Kannada literature while Fleet published folk ballads such as Sangoli Rayana Dange ("Sangoli Raya's Revolt"). The first Kannada newspaper, Mangalura Samachara ("Mangalore News"), was published in Mangalore in 1843. In a few years, printing presses opened in many locations, including at the Mysore palace in 1840.

A surge in the generation of prose narratives and dramatic literature, inspired by writings in English, Sanskrit, modern Marathi and modern Bengali languages culminated in original works in the succeeding decades. In the field of prose, translation of English classics such as Yatrikana Sanchara (The Pilgrim's Progress by Bunyan, 1847) and Robinson Crusoe (1857) set the trend. Translations from vernacular languages were popular too and included the Marathi classic Yamuna Prayatana (1869) and the Bengali work Durgesanandini (1885). In the genre of drama, inspiration came from translations of Sanskrit and English plays. Shakuntala and Raghavendrarao Nataka (Othello) by Churamuri Sehagiri Rao (1869), Pramilarjuniya by Srikantesa Gowda and Vasanthayamini Swapnachamatkara Nataka by K. Vasudevachar (Midsummer Night's Dream), Macbeth by Srikantesa Gowda, King Lear by M.S. Puttanna, Ramavarma-Lilavati (Romeo and Juliet) by C. Ananda Rao paved the way.

Basavappa Shastry (1882), a native of Mysore and court poet of Maharaja Krishnaraja III and Maharaja Chamaraja Wodeyar IX, earned the honorific Kannada Nataka Pitamaha (lit. "Father of Kannada stage") for his contributions to drama. His contribution to dramatic literature in the form of anthologies, translations and adaptations from English and Sanskrit, learned editions, and successful integration of musical compositions into drama is well accepted. His translations from English to Kannada include Shurasena Charite ("Othello"). His Sanskrit to Kannada translations include, Kalidasa, Abhignyana Shakuntala, Vikramorvasheeya, Malavikagnimitra, Uttara Rama Charite, Chanda Koushika Nataka, Malathi Madhava and Ratnavali. Other well-known Kannada writers in Chamaraja IX's court were S.G. Narasimhacharya, Dhondo Narasimha Mulabaglu, Santa Kavi and B. Ventakacharya.

The earliest modern novels in the Kannada language are the Suryakantha by Lakshman Gadagkar (1892) and the Indrabayi (1899) by Gulvadi Venkata Rao. The later work is reformist and decried corruption and encouraged widow remarriages. Suri Venkataramana Shastri's modern social play Iggappa Heggadeya Vivaha Prahasana ("Iggappa Heggade's farce of marriage", 1887) and Dhareswar's Kanya Vikraya (1887) carried a similar reformist outlook while Santa Kavi's Vatsalaharana (1885) drew upon mythological and folk themes.

== Developments up to the mid-20th century ==
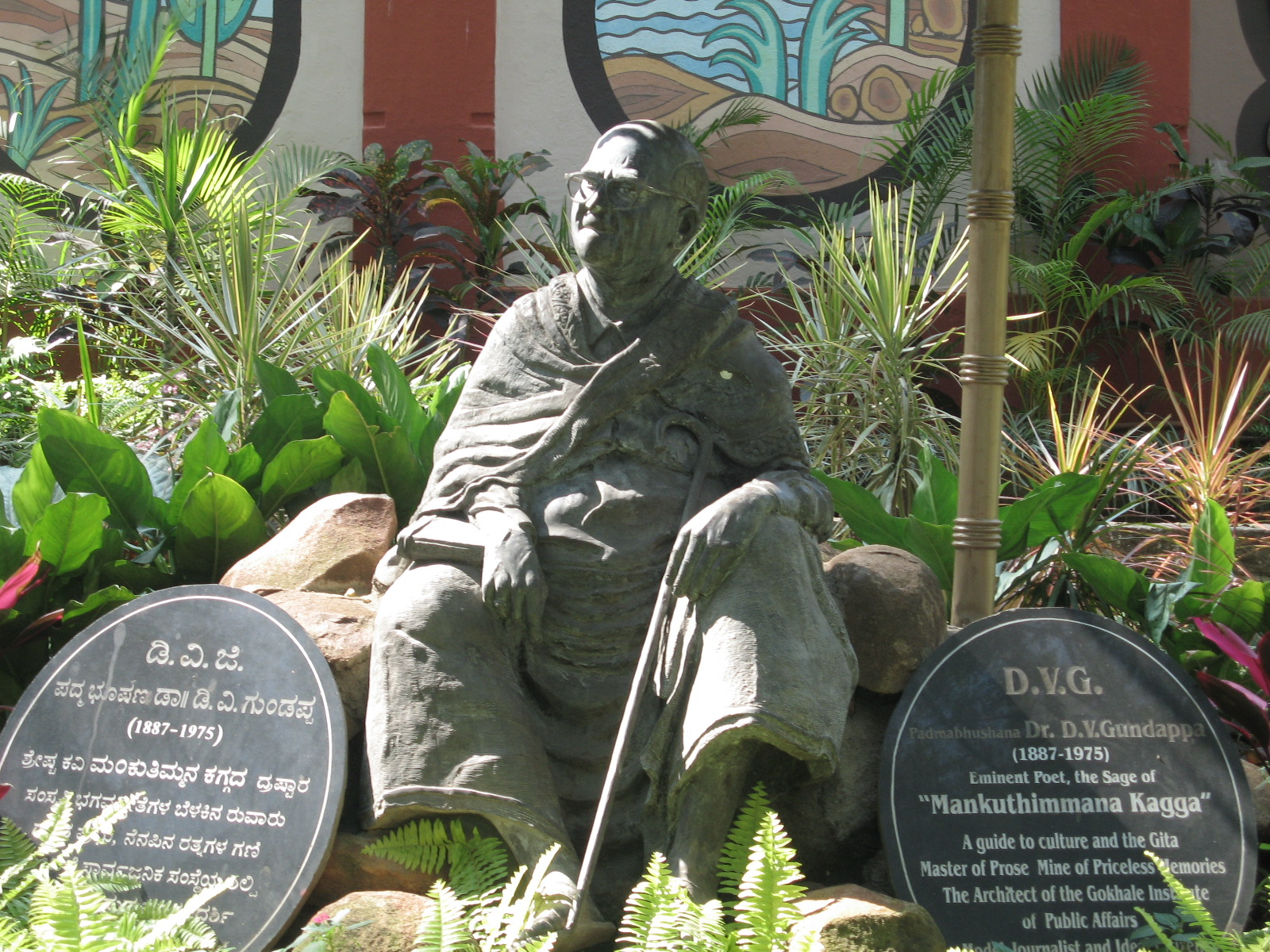
Statue of noted Kannada writer D. V. Gundappa at Bugle rock garden, Bangalore

In 1881, the British handed back administrative powers to the Wodeyar family. Up to 1947, when the kingdom acceded to the Union of India, the incumbent Maharaja was assisted by a Diwan (Prime minister), the administrative chief of Mysore. These were times of positive social and economic change, the independence movement and modern nationalism, all of which influenced literature.

Kannada literature saw the blossoming of the Navodaya (lit. "New beginning") style of writings in genres such as lyrical poems, drama, novels and short stories, with the strong influence of English literature. B. M. Srikantaiah's English Geetagalu ("English songs", 1921) was the path-breaker in the genre of modern lyrical poetry. The earliest stalwarts in the field of modern historical drama and comedy were T. P. Kailasam and A.N. Swami Venkatadri Iyer (also called "Samsa"). Kailasam sought to critique social developments by producing plays that questioned the utility of the modern education system in Tollu Gatti (1918, "The Hollow and the Solid") and the dowry system in Tali Kattoke Cooline ("Wages for tying the Mangalsutra"). Samsa's ideal king, Narasaraja Wodeyar, is the protagonist of the play Vigada Vikramarya ("The Wicked Vikramarya", 1925).

Initial development in the genre of historical novels, in the form of translations and original works, sought to re-kindle the nationalistic feelings of Kannadigas. Venkatachar (Anandamatha) and Galaganath were among the first to write such novels. Galaganath's Madhava Karuna Vilasa (1923) described the founding of the Vijayanagara empire, while his Kannadigara Karmakatha ("Kannadigas Fateful Tale") described the empire's decline. In 1917, Alur Venkata Rao wrote the famous Karnataka Ghata Vaibhava, a summary of earlier works by Fleet, Rice, Bhandarkar and Robert Sewell, appealing to the Kannadigas to remember their glorious past, their ancient traditions and culture, their great rulers, saints and poets. Other well-known works were Kerur Vasudevachar's Yadu Maharaja describing the rise of the Wodeyar dynasty, and Vasudevaiah's Arya Kirti (1896). The tradition of novels started by Gulvadi Venkata Rao (1899) reached maturity in 1915 with M.S. Puttanna's Madidunno Maharaya ("Sir, as you sow, so you reap"), a historical novel written in flowing prose and whose theme is set in the times of Maharaja Krishnaraja III. To Puttanna also goes the credit for writing the earliest modern biography, Kunigal Ramashastriya Charitre ("The story of Kunigal Ramashastri"). The genre of short story made its initial beginnings with Panje Mangesh Rao, M.N. Kamath and Kerur Vasudevachar, but it was Masti Venkatesh Iyengar who stole the limelight with and set a trend for others to follow in his Kelavu Sanne Kathegalu ("A few short stories", 1920) and Sanna Kathegalu ("Short stories", 1924).

The efforts of these early pioneers were to become a forerunner for the golden age in the decades to follow. A long list of noted poets and writers followed: D. R. Bendre (Gari, "The Wing", 1932) and Govinda Pai (Gilivindu, "Parrots", 1930), perhaps the most acclaimed writers of lyrical poems that synthesised the work of the English romantics with native traditions; K. Shivaram Karanth, the noted novelist and author of Chomana Dudi ("Choma's Toil", 1933); Kuvempu, one of Kannada's doyen poets who showed his brilliance in using the blank verse in his masterpiece epic and magnum opus, Sri Ramayana Darshanam (1949); V. K. Gokak, a writer of drama, criticism, songs and epic (Bharata Sindhu Rashmi, 1940); D. V. Gundappa, the philosopher-writer to whom is ascribed writings in just about every genre, though his most notable work is the Mankuthimmana Kagga ("Dull Thimma's Rigmarole", 1943), which closely compares with the wisdom poems of the late medieval poet Sarvajna.

== Bibliography ==
- Ashton, Martha Bush (2003) [2003]. "History of Yakshagana". Yakshagana. Abhinav Publications. ISBN 81-7017-047-8.
- Ciṭaṇīsa, Ke. En; Chitnis, Krishnaji Nageshrao (2000). The Nawabs of Savanur. Atlantic Publishers & Distributors. ISBN 81-7156-521-2.
- Das, Sisir Kumar (1991). A History of Indian Literature. Sahitya Akademi. ISBN 81-7201-006-0.
- Brandon, James R; Banham, Martin (1993) [1993]. The Cambridge Guide to Asian Theatre. Cambridge University Press. ISBN 0-521-58822-7.
- Kamath, Suryanath U. (2001) [1980]. A concise history of Karnataka : from pre-historic times to the present. Bangalore: Jupiter books. OCLC 7796041.
- Kamath and Kher, M.V. and V.B. (2000) [2000]. Sai Baba of Shirdi:A Unique Saint. Jaico Publishing House. ISBN 81-7224-030-9.
- Murthy, K. Narasimha (1992). "Modern Kannada Literature". In George K.M (ed.). Modern Indian Literature:An Anthology - Vol 1. Sahitya Akademi. ISBN 81-7201-324-8.
- Mukherjee, Sujit (1999) [1999]. A Dictionary of Indian Literature. Orient Blackswan. ISBN 81-250-1453-5.
- Nagaraj, D.R. (2003) [2003]. "Critical Tensions in the History of Kannada Literary Culture". In Sheldon I. Pollock (ed.). Literary Cultures in History: Reconstructions from South Asia. Berkeley and London: University of California Press. ISBN 0-520-22821-9.
- NAIKAR, BASAVARAJ (2008). LITERARY VISION. Sarup & Sons. ISBN 978-81-7625-566-0.
- Narasimhacharya, R (1988) [1934]. History of Kannada Literature. Asian Educational Services. ISBN 81-206-0303-6.
- Pranesh, Meera Rajaram (2003) [2003]. Musical Composers during Wodeyar Dynasty (1638–1947 A.D.). Bangalore: Vee Emm Publications.
- Prasad, K.B. Prabhu (1987) [1987]. Sarvajna. Sahitya Akademi. ISBN 81-7201-404-X.
- Rice, E. P. (1982) [1921]. Kannada Literature. New Delhi: Asian Educational Services. ISBN 81-206-0063-0.
- Sharma, B.N.K (2000) [2000]. History of the Dvaita School of Vedanta and Its Literature: From the Earliest Beginnings to Our Own Times. Motilal Banarsidass. ISBN 81-208-1575-0.
- Shipley, Joseph T. (2007) [2007]. Encyclopedia of Literature - Vol I. READ BOOKS. ISBN 978-1-4067-0135-7.
- Shiva Prakash, H.S. (1997). "Kannada". In Ayyappapanicker (ed.). Medieval Indian Literature:An Anthology. Sahitya Akademi. ISBN 81-260-0365-0.
- Thielemann, Selina (2002). Divine Service and the Performing Arts in India. APH Publishing. ISBN 81-7648-333-8.
- Various (1992) [1992]. Mohan Lal (ed.). Encyclopaedia of Indian literature - vol 5. Sahitya Akademi. ISBN 81-260-1221-8.
- Various (1988) [1988]. Amaresh Datta (ed.). Encyclopaedia of Indian literature - vol 2. Sahitya Akademi. ISBN 81-260-1194-7.
- Various (1987) [1987]. Amaresh Datta (ed.). Encyclopaedia of Indian literature - vol 1. Sahitya Akademi. ISBN 81-260-1803-8.
