= Rechamballi =

Coordinates: 11.975075°N 77.024696°E

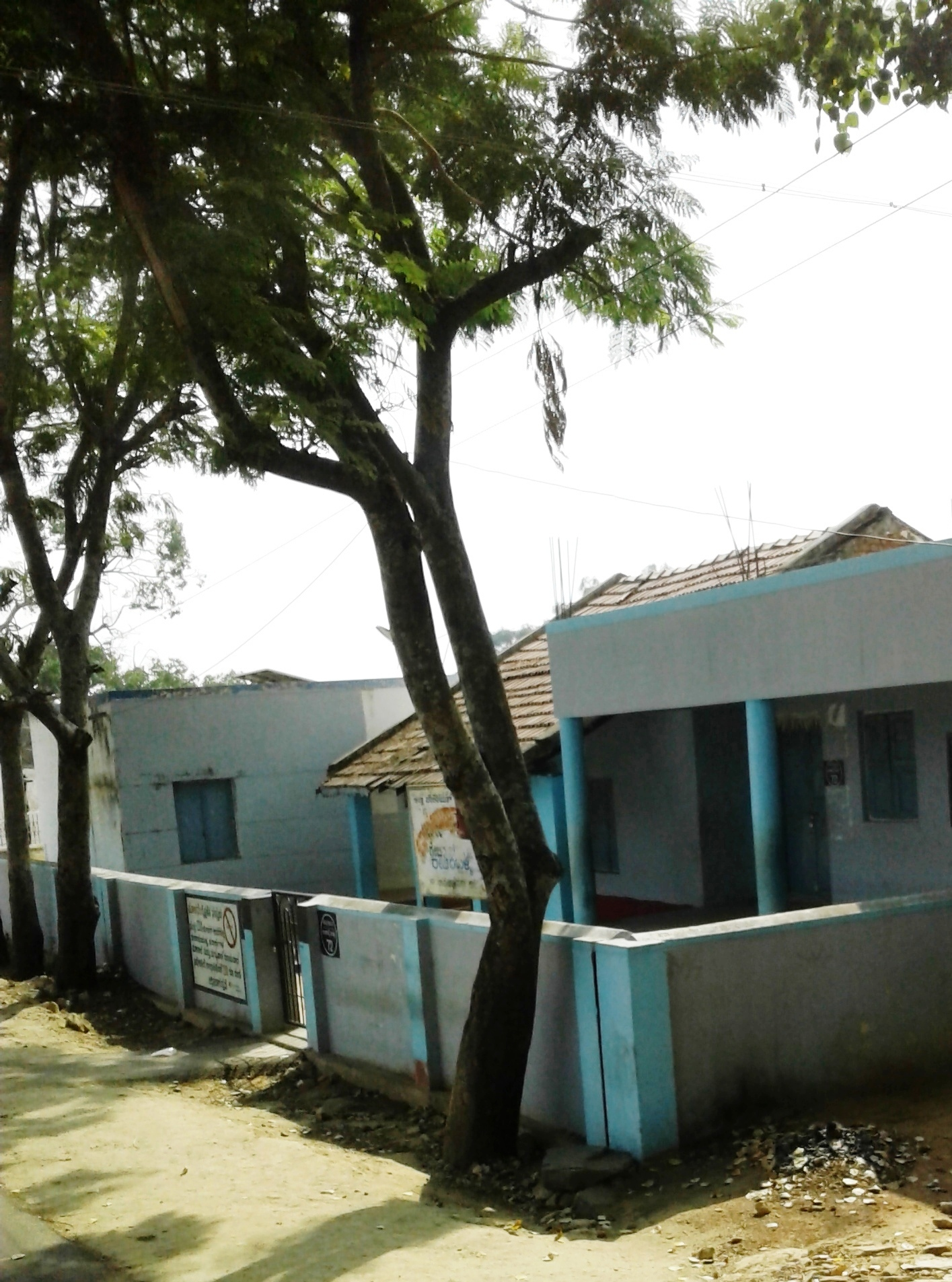
Rechamballi village, Yelandur

Rechamballi is a village in Chamarajanagar district of Karnataka state, India. It is located between Chamarajanagar town and Yelandur town.

== Demographics ==
Rachamballi has an area of 287 hectares and a population of 619,634. The nearest town is Yelandur about 10 km away.

== Nearby villages ==
1. Suthur
2. Chatipura
3. Kallipura
4. Masanapura
5. H Mookahalli
6. Homma
7. Kotamballi
8. Nanjarajapura
9. Honganoor
10. Bettahalli
11. Gangavadi
12. Hosapura
13. Thimmegowdanapalya
14. Hanumanapura
15. Melmala

16. Gowdahalli

== See also ==
- Kagalvadi
- Yelandur
- Chamarajanagar
- Irasavadi
