= Kagalvadi =

Villages in Karnataka, India

Coordinates: 11.958371°N 77.018704°E

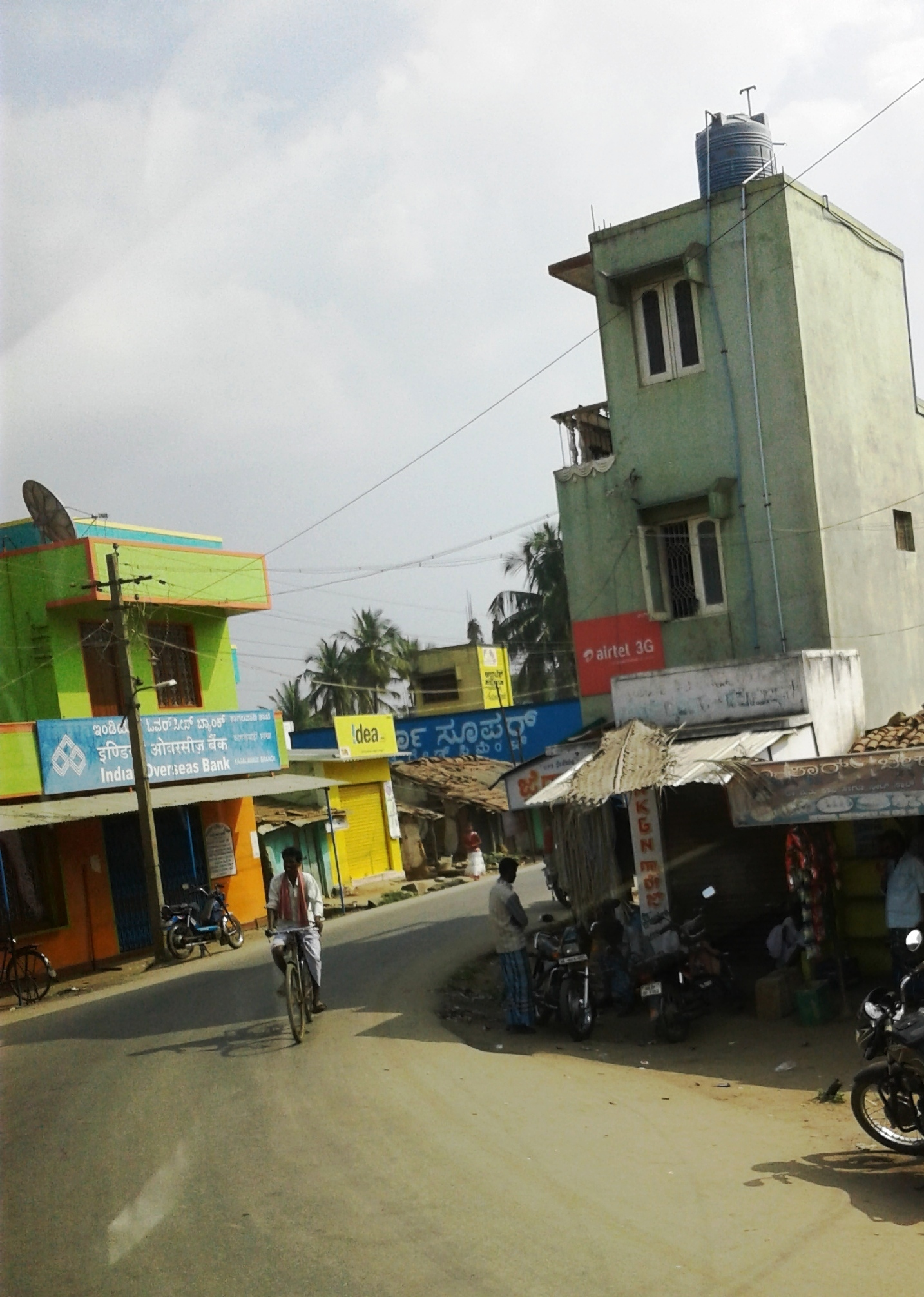
Kagalavadi Junction

Kagalavadi is a village in Chamarajanagar district of Karnataka state, India.

== Location ==
Kagalvadi is located between Chamarajanagar town and Yelandur town.

== Postal code ==
There is a post office in Kagalvadi and the postal code is 571117.

== Economy ==
The economy of the village is mostly agrarian. Indian Overseas Bank has a branch at Kagalvadi.

== See also ==
- Rechamballi
- Yelandur
- Chamarajanagar
- Irasavadi
