= Yelandur =

- Town
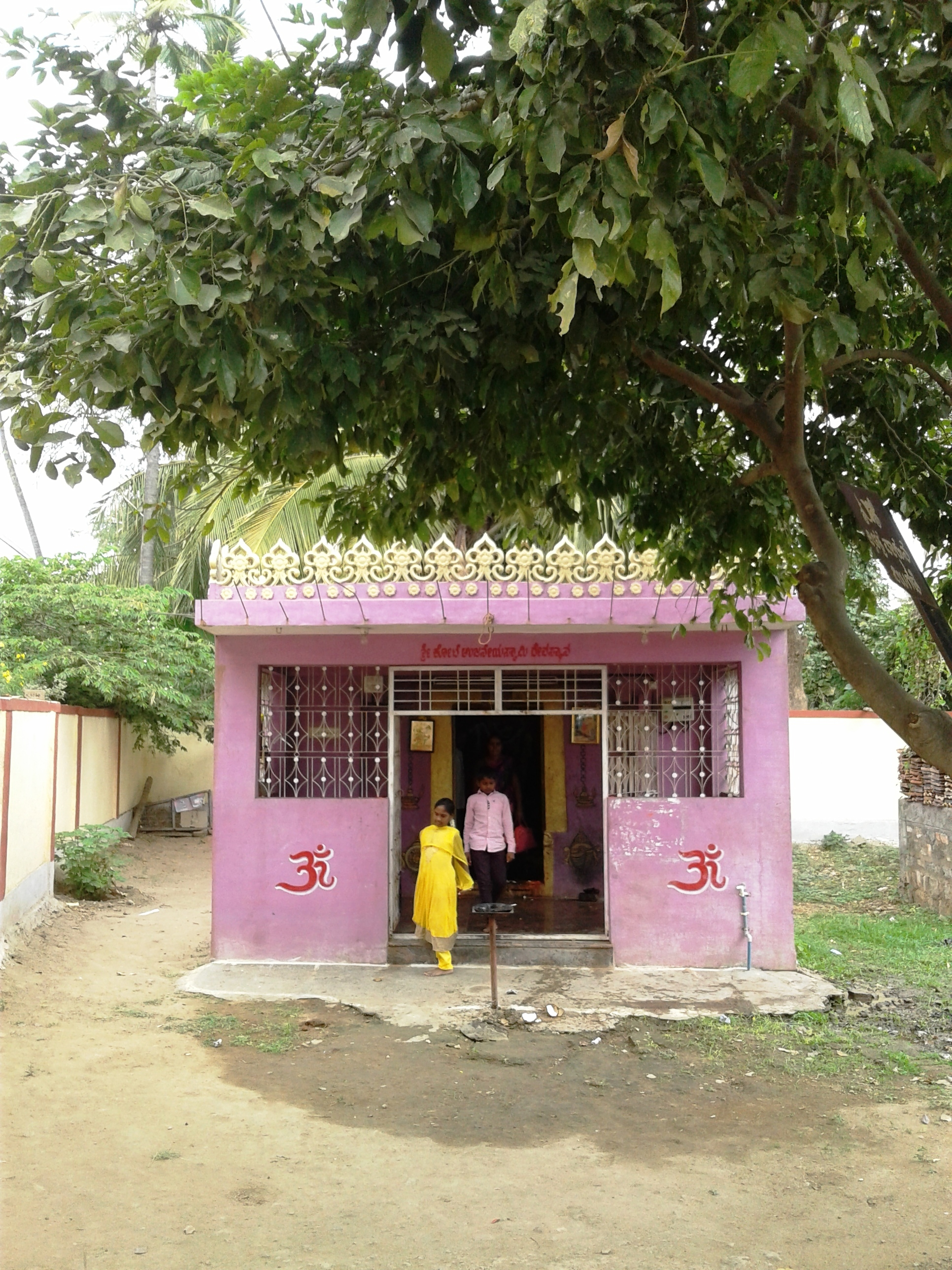
- Anjeneya Swamy Temple

- Location in Karnataka, India
- Coordinates: 12.07°N 77.03°E
- Country: India
- State: Karnataka
- District: Chamarajanagara

Government
  - Body: Town Panchayath

Area
  - Town: 0.72 km^{2} (0.28 sq mi)
  - Rural: 265 km^{2} (102 sq mi)
- Elevation: 670 m (2,200 ft)

Population (2011)
  - Town: 8,779
  - Density: 12,000/km^{2} (32,000/sq mi)
  - Rural: 73,290

Languages
  - Official: Kannada
- Time zone: UTC+5:30 (IST)
- Vehicle registration: KA-10
- Website: www.yelandurtown.gov.in

Yelandur is a taluk and town in Chamarajanagar district in southern Karnataka, India. It has historic and cultural importance in this region. Along with three other taluks, it was officially included into Chamarajanagar district when the district was notified upon bifurcation of Mysore district in 1997.

== Historic importance ==
It was under the rule of the Vijayanagara Empire in the 15th and 16th centuries. When it came under the rule of Wadiyar dynasty of Mysuru, in the early 18th century, Dewan Purnaiah, a notable Dewan of Kingdom of Mysore from here, was gifted the Jagir of Yalandur and its surrounding villages by Krishnaraja Wodeyar III - the King of Mysuru, in appreciation of the great service rendered to the Mysuru State by Purnaiah as Dewan or the Prime Minister. Purnaiah was instrumental in making the Mysore State into a strong empire and greatly admired, as son of the soil, for having developed the region with several visionary works.

== Geography ==
Yelandur is located at 12.07°N 77.03°E. It has an average elevation of 555 metres (1820 feet). Yalandur is the taluk and city in Chamarajanagar district in Karnataka state of India. It consists of 33 villages. It is situated about 59 km south-west of Mysuru and about 150 km south of Bengaluru on National Highway NH 209. In history it was called Cholendra Simha Chaturvedi Mangala and Yele Induru. Later on, it changed into Yalandur.

== Demographics ==
There are 33 villages and the taluk headquarter town of Yelandur being the only urban center. The town has a population of had a population of 8583. Males constitute 51% of the population and females 49%. Yalandur has an average literacy rate of 58%, lower than the national average of 59.5%: male literacy is 65%, and female literacy is 50%. In Yalandur, 10% of the population is under six years of age.

== Culture ==
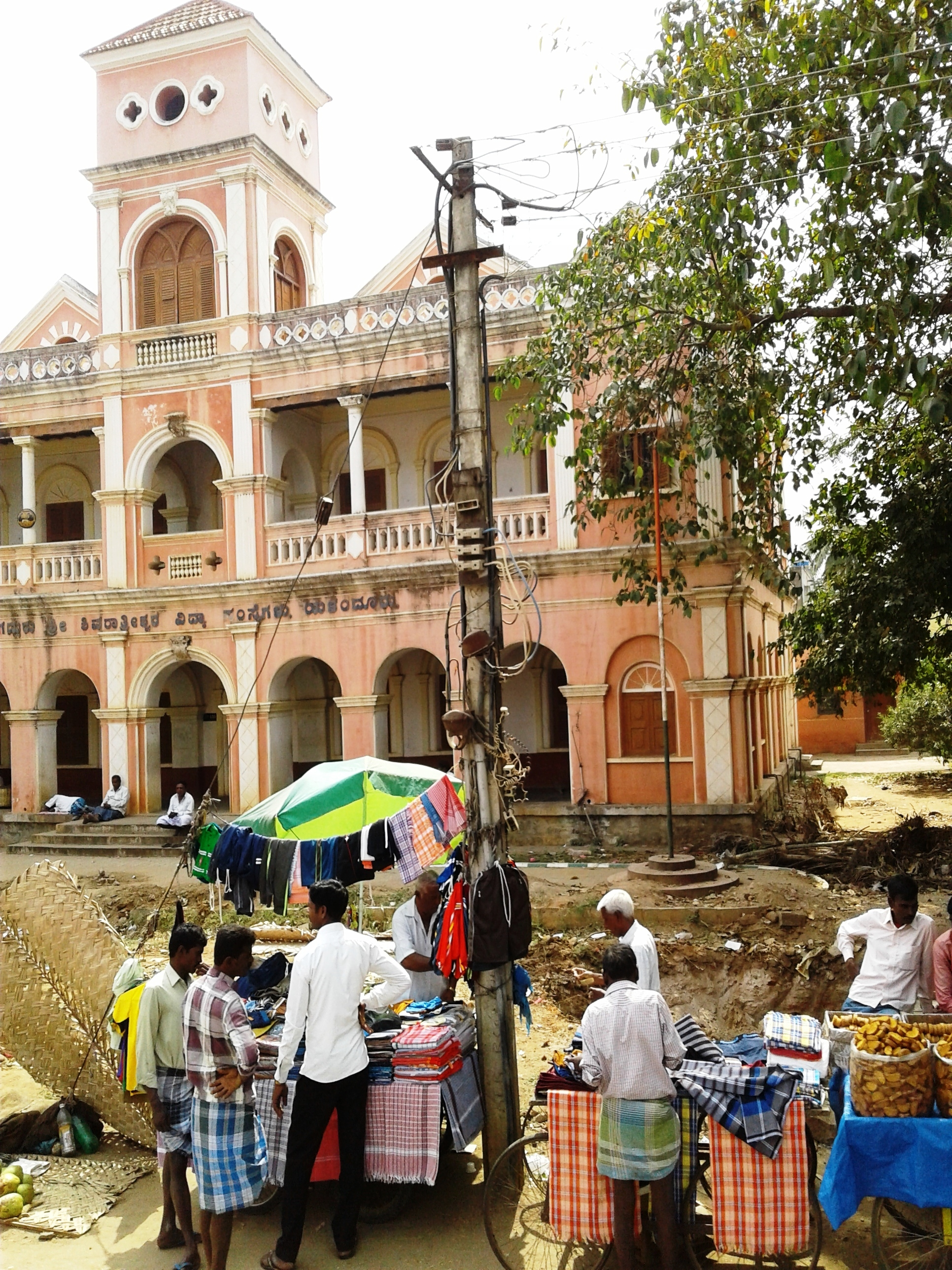
Fruit vendors in front of JSS office

Gaurishvara temple was built in 1550 A.D during the reign of Devabhupala (Singadepa). This temple was rebuilt in 1654 -1655 by Muddabhupa, grand on Devabhupala, as the old temple was highly dilapidated. The temple has some unique features which makes it very distinctive. Though there is no towering entrance gopura (as is common in South Indian temples), it has a mahadwara or gate called "Bale Mantapa" (Bangle entrance) which has exquisitely stone carved themes, on the walls and pillars, depicting mythological stories of Andhakasura (slaying of demon Andhakasura), Narasimha (half man – half lion god) in various manifestations of Dakshinamurthy and Sharaba, Bhairava, Kalingamardhana Krishna, Vali and Sugriva. Monolithic stone chains (stone carved rings - 20 cm each) adorn the four corners and the door side of the entrance which gives the name of Bale (Bangle) Mantapa to the temple entrance.

Another important temple in the town is Varahaswamy Temple. Varaha is the third avatar of Vishnu. A very rare temple of this kind. Every year on the day of Holi, a festival of colors there will be a procession of God varaha in around the temple. One more curious thing in the temple is the idol Ganesha which is there in south-west corner, is believed to be more worshiped God in the town. It is a very small idol and there is evidence that it is growing in the shape of Ganesha.

The famous Kannada poet Sri Shadakshara was from Yalandur. The temple in the town is well known for ornate chains carved out of granite stone.

== Education ==
The Gaurishvara temple is one of the main temples in the town

== Tourism ==
B R Hills is one of the major tourist destinations in the taluk. At a height of 5,091 feet above sea level, this hill stretches from north to south for about 16 km. It has been designated as a tiger reserve in view of its tiger population. Kyathadevaraya Gudi (or K Gudi) is another popular tourist destination located within BR Hills.

== Image gallery ==
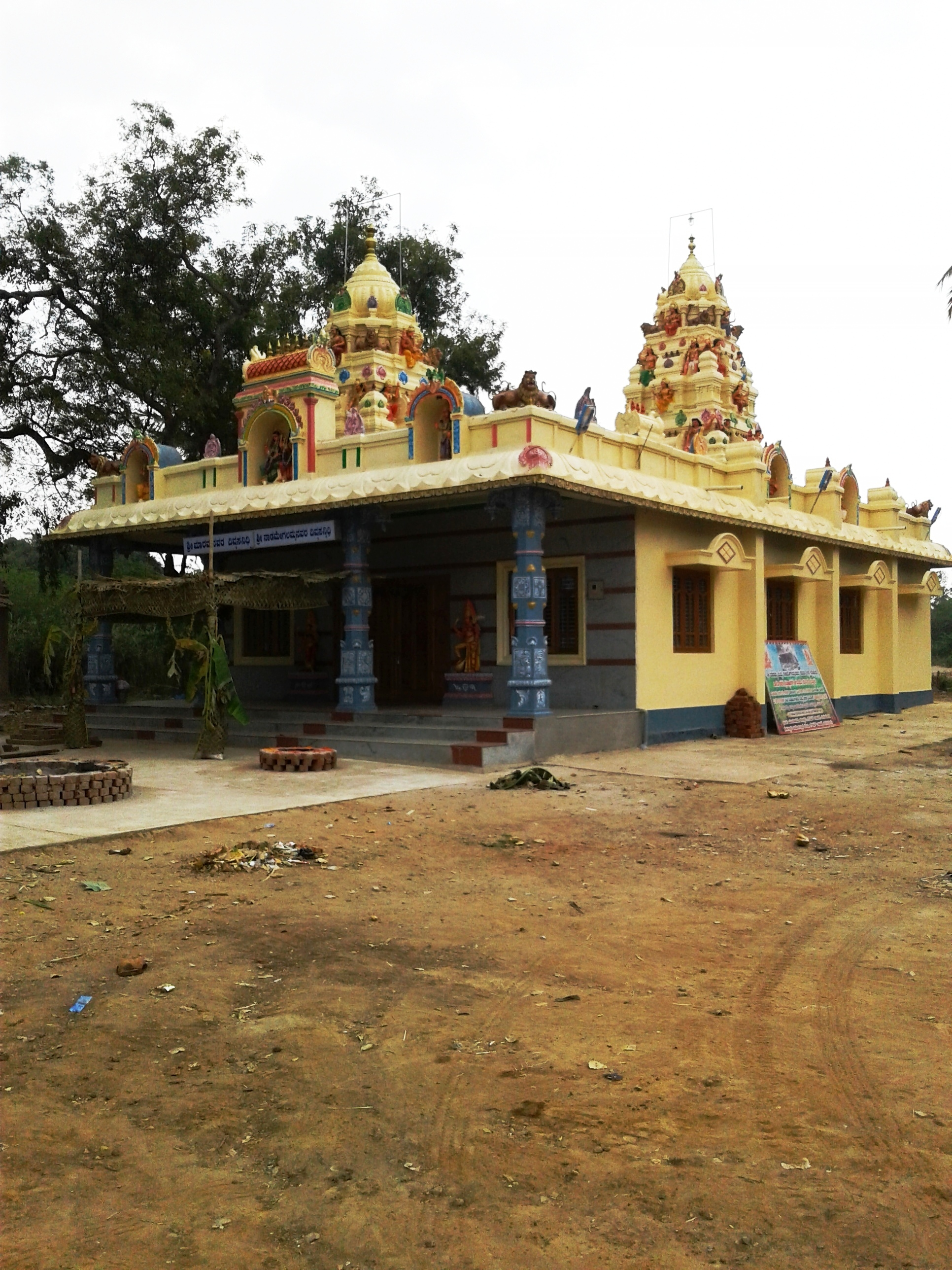
Mariamma temple

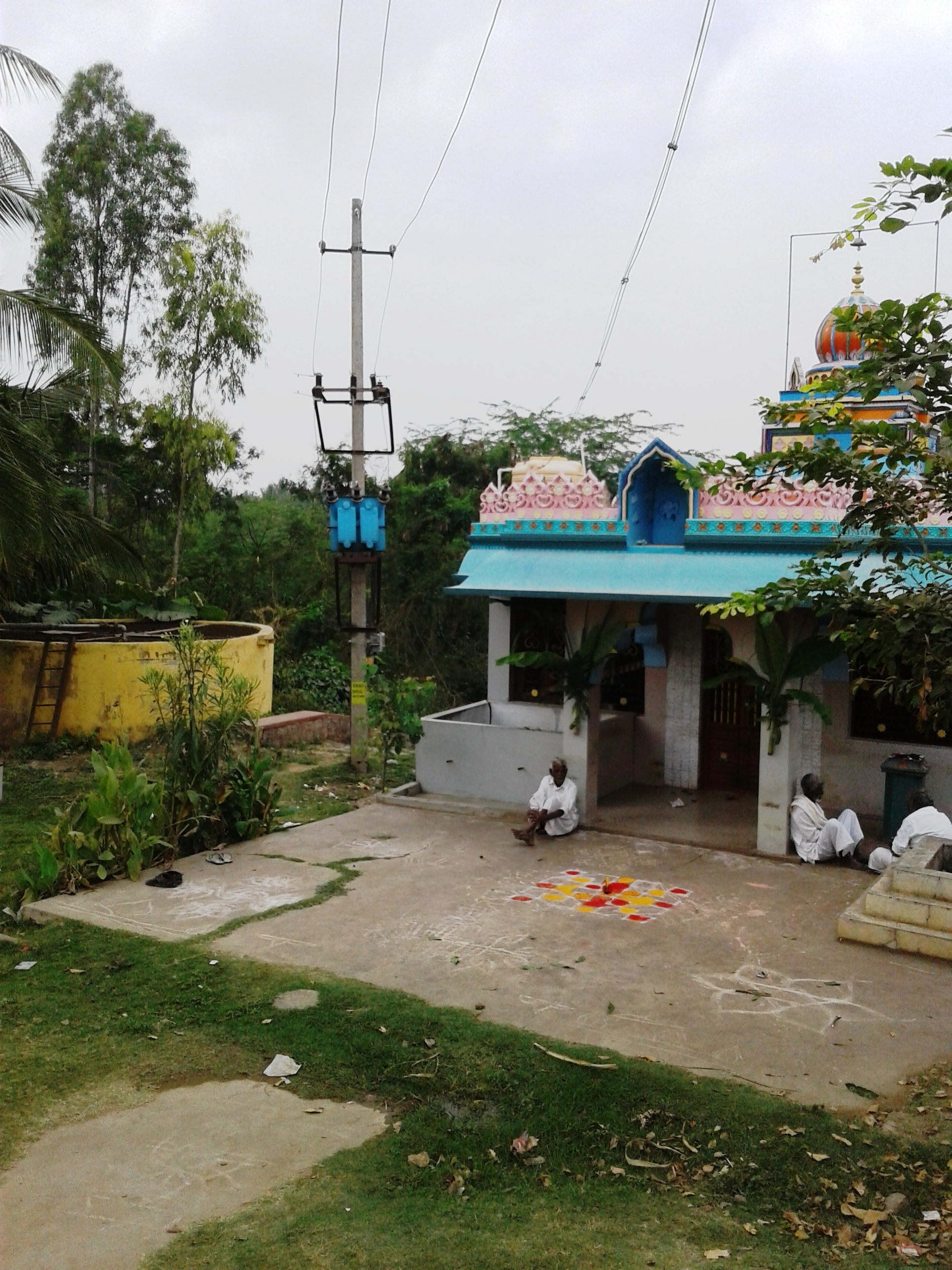
Vigneswara Temple

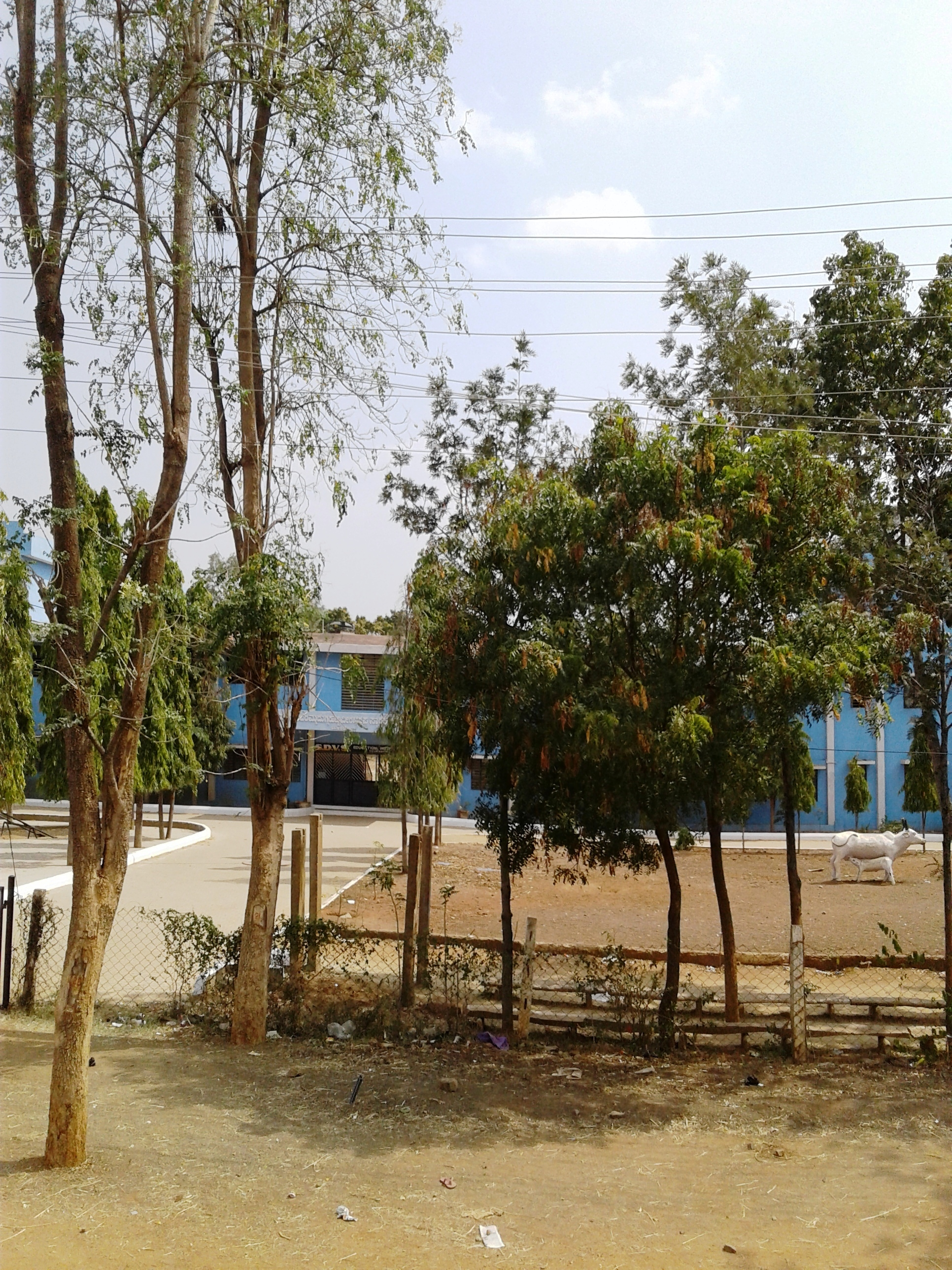
Technical School

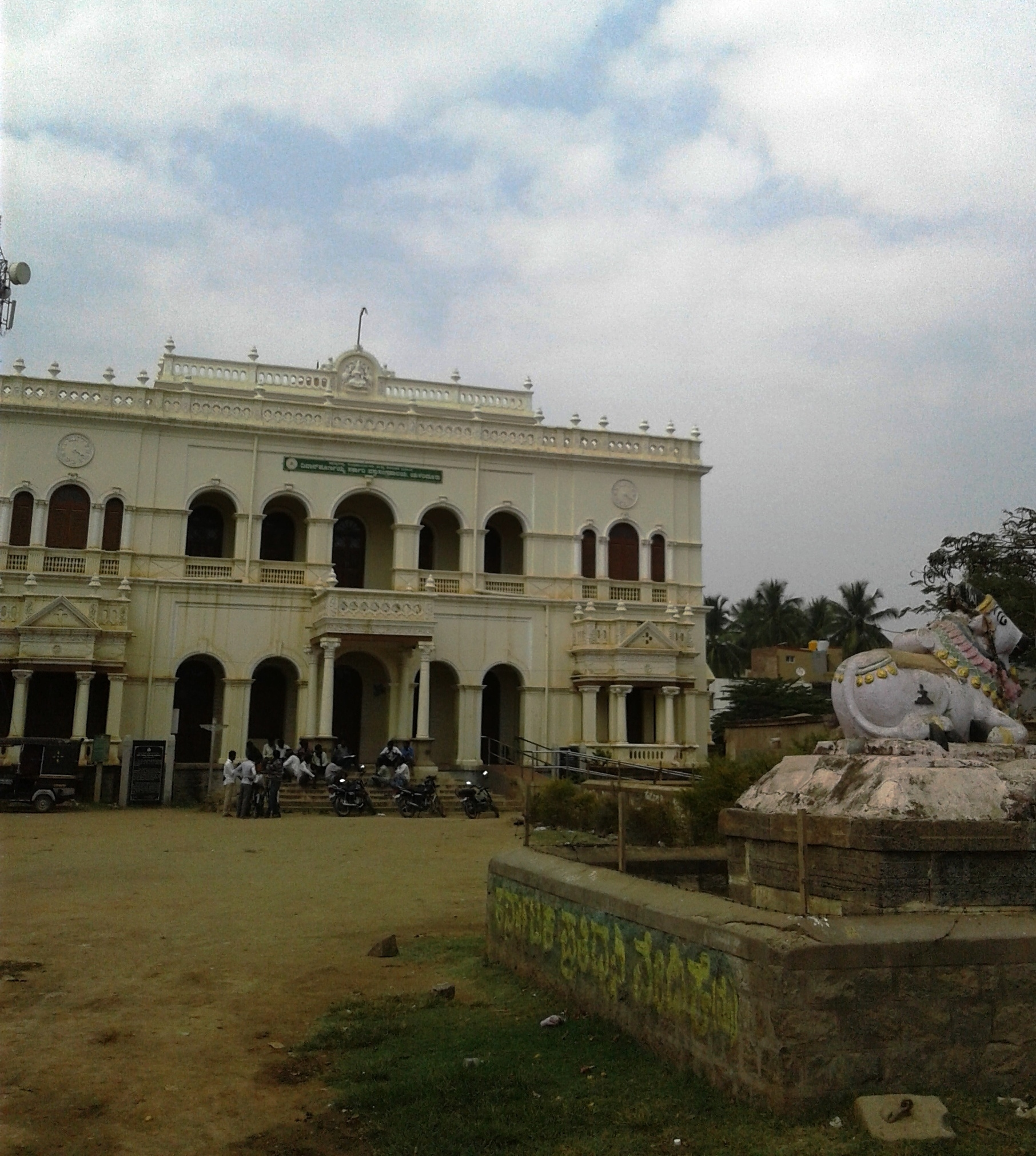
JSS School

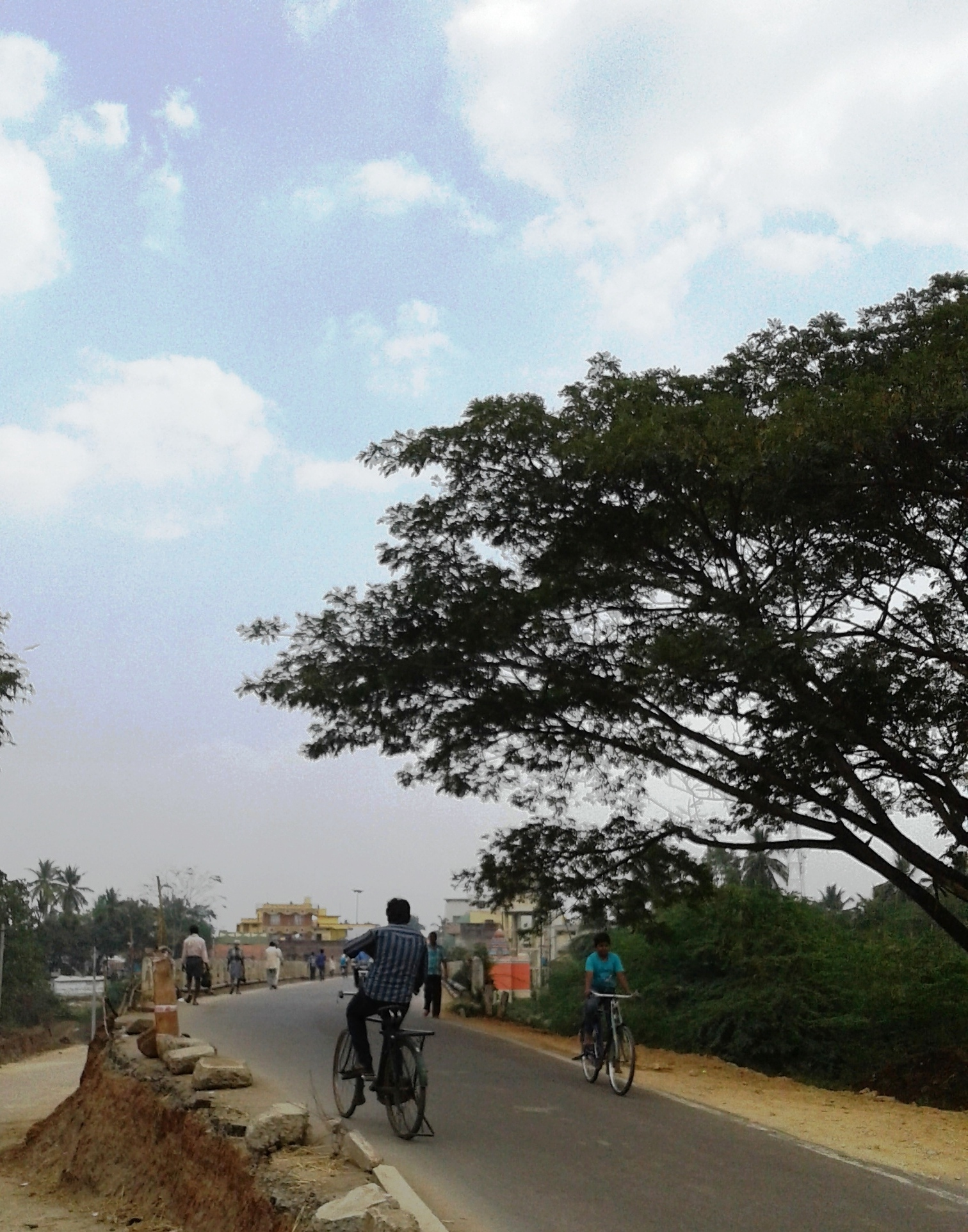
The town

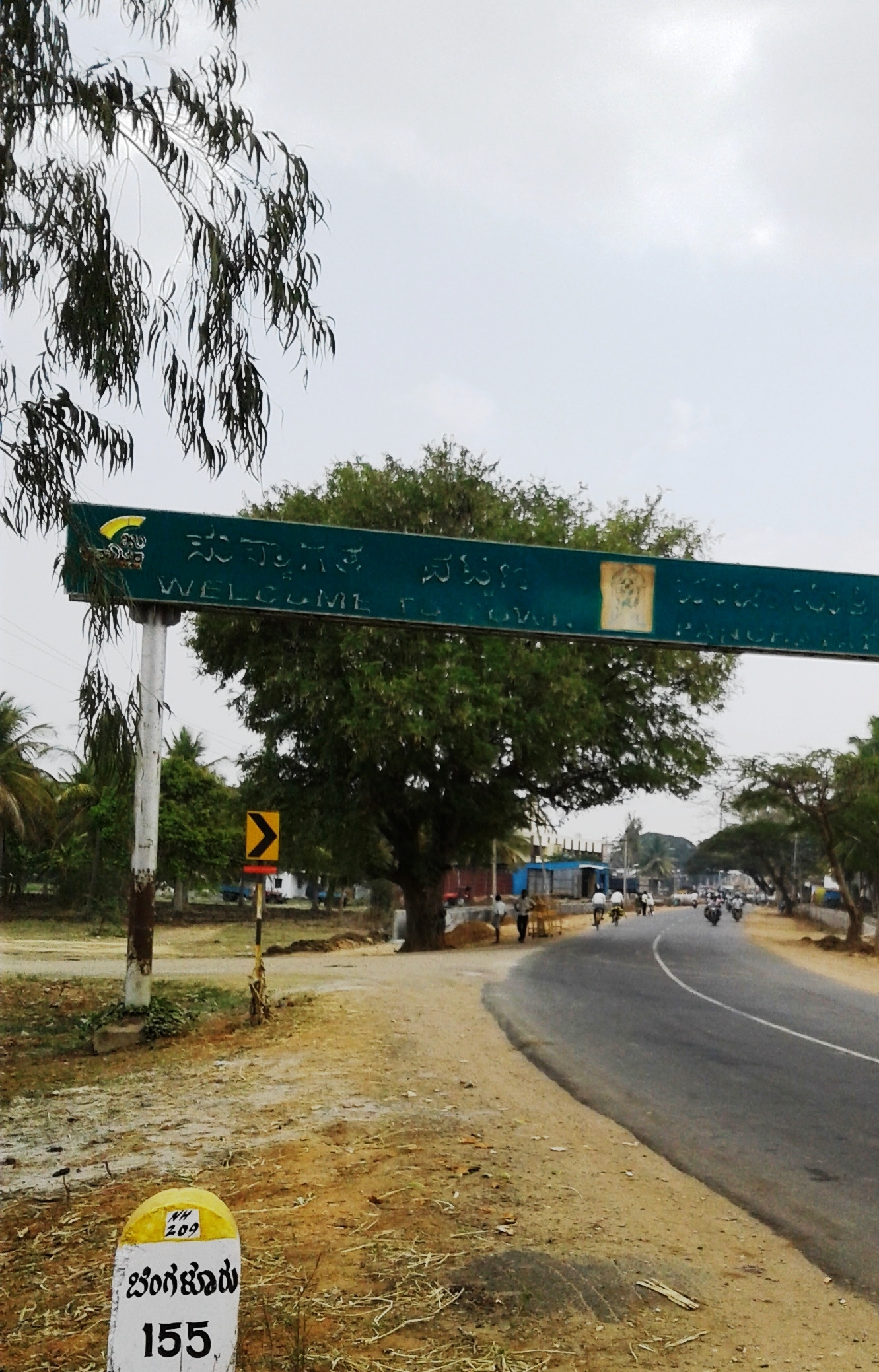
Yelandur

== See also ==
- Yelandur estate
- Rechamballi
- Kagalvadi
- Chamarajanagar
- Irasavadi
- Yeriyuru
- Shankara samadhi
