= Manihatty =

- village
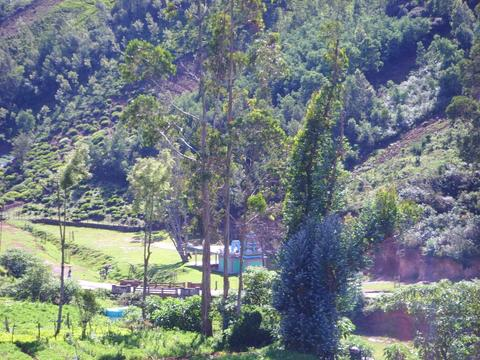

- Location in Tamil Nadu, India Manihatty (India)
- Coordinates: 11°20′0″N 76°40′0″E
- Country: India
- State: Tamil Nadu
- District: Nilgiri

Languages
  - Official: Tamil
- Time zone: UTC+5:30 (IST)
- Vehicle registration: TN-
- Coastline: 0 kilometres (0 mi)

Manihatty, also known as B.Manihatty, is a village in the Nilgiris District of Tamil Nadu, India. Manihatty is 16 km to the south west of Ooty, the district capital of the Nilgiris.

The residents of the village are predominantly part of the Badaga people, an ethnolinguistic community in the Nilgiris district.

The village of Manihatty consists of two smaller hamlets: Kunna Hatty (Meaning "small village" in the Badaga language) and Dodda Hatty ("big village"). Kunna Hatty is the ooru, the primary village, supposedly built by the ancestors, while Dodda Hatty is an offshoot from Kunna Hatty.

Over the years, Dodda Hatty has grown considerably in terms of the number of households and relative population. Kunna Hatty has about 100 households and Dodda Hatty about 350 households.

== Economy ==
The economy of Manihatty is dependent on agriculture and tea plantations.

== Culture ==
Jangura Habba (Sacred Thread Festival) is the main festival of Manihatty. During this festival, people pray to Shiva, one of the principal deities of Hinduism.
