= Soliga =

Soliga or Sholaga may refer to:

- The Soliga people of Karnataka and Tamil Nadu, India
- Sholaga language, the Dravidian language spoken by them
