= Oscar speech =

Monologue spoken by an Academy Award winner

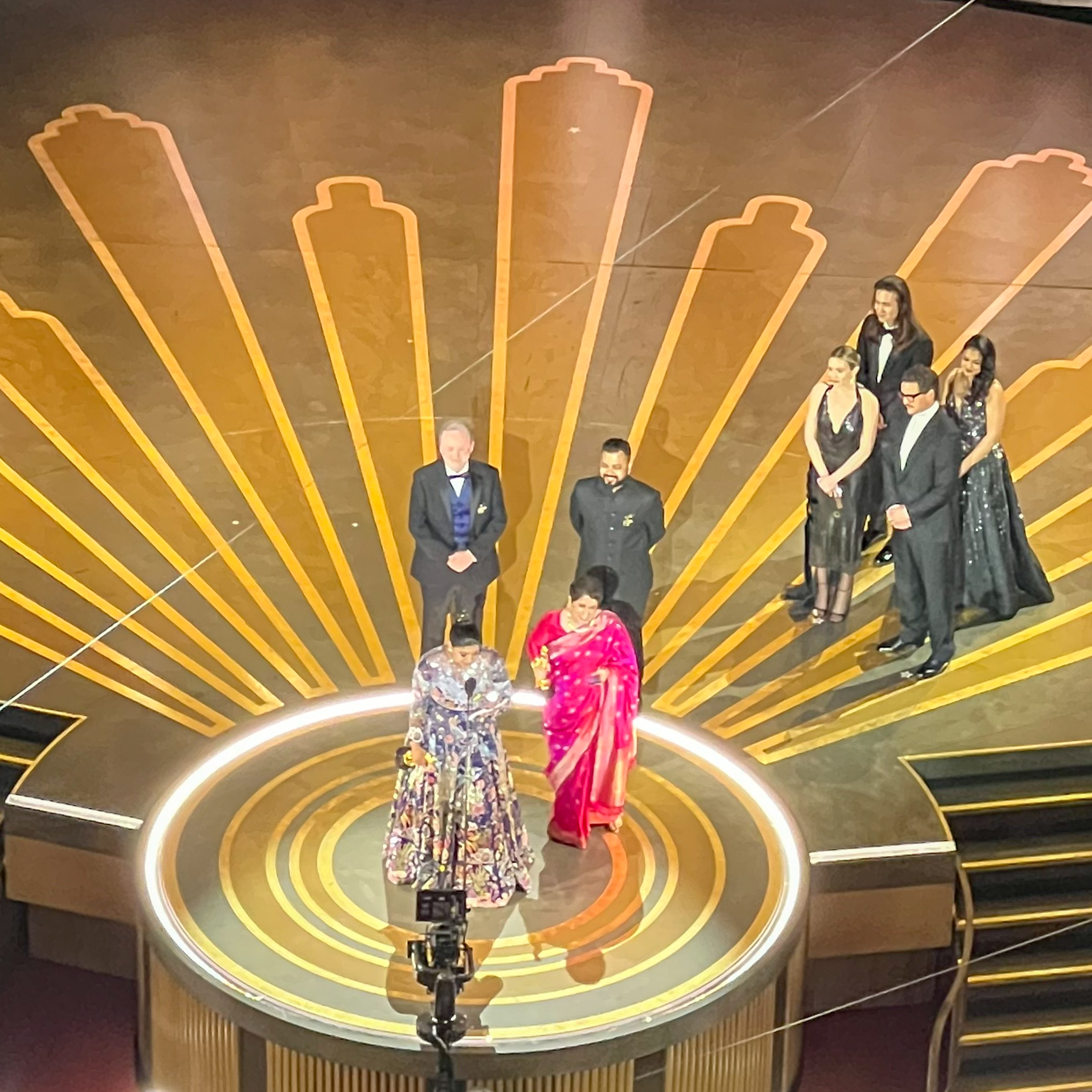
Kartiki Gonsalves gives her Oscar speech after winning Best Documentary Short for The Elephant Whisperers at the 95th Academy Awards.

An Oscar speech is a public monologue given by a person who has just been awarded an Academy Award, an annual accolade given by the Academy of Motion Picture Arts and Sciences to honor cinematic achievements in the film industry. Though speeches are common for award ceremonies, it is a particularly significant feature of the Academy Awards due to their worldwide audience and history of featuring prominent celebrities.

== History ==
Oscar speeches have always been a significant aspect of the ceremony and have often been influential. NineMSN explains, "If you're an Academy Award-winning celeb, you can either give a boring run-of-the-mill acceptance speech, a touching acceptance speech, or a crazy over-the-top acceptance speech". The New Yorker said:

Common pitfalls include self-aggrandizement (King of the World James Cameron), excessive weepiness (Gwyneth Paltrow), and sheer who-invited-this-person weirdness (Melissa Leo). Some are passive-aggressive (Shirley MacLaine, who thanked Debra Winger for her "turbulent brilliance"). Some are strident (Vanessa Redgrave, who chided "Zionist hoodlums"). Some are unsettling (Angelina Jolie, who declared herself "so in love with my brother right now"). At their best, they offer a jolt of liberating mania (Roberto Benigni), or a banquet of finely calibrated self-deprecation, gratitude, and poise (Meryl Streep).

== Characteristics ==
The New Yorker graded the speeches in the 2013 Academy Awards, a common practice among news outlets. Christoph Waltz's "short and classy speech ... without condescension" was graded an "A minus" while Quentin Tarantino's "rubber-faced self-mythologizing" was graded a "C". At the 2013 Oscars, Jennifer Lawrence fell when approaching the stage to accept the award for Best Actress. She attempted to make up for her fall in her speech by saying, "You guys are all just standing because I fell and that's really embarrassing". By the next day pictures of her fall had gone viral in the Internet. Her fall was mentioned by host Ellen DeGeneres in her opening monologue at the 2014 Oscars.

Many lines from Oscar speeches have become iconic, often being quoted in the pop culture vernacular. They are often spoofed in other media. Some speeches comment on the film industry ("We are part of an artistic family ... and most actors don't work, they have to practice accents while driving a taxi. And some of us are so lucky to work with writing, to work with directing. And to that artistic family that strives for excellence, none of you have ever lost, and I am proud to share this with you." Dustin Hoffman 1979). Some are heartfelt messages to friends, family, and supporters. Some raise awareness for sensitive topics ("Tonight I am asking for your help. I call upon you to draw from the depths of your being to prove that we are a human race. To prove that our love outweighs our need to hate. That our compassion is more compelling than our need to blame." Elizabeth Taylor 1993 on AIDS), while others are funny insights.

Sometimes people do unexpected things during their Oscar speeches. For example, in 1992, while accepting his Best Supporting Actor Oscar for City Slickers, Jack Palance did one-arm pushups on the floor to demonstrate his physical strength and counteract the view of some executives who had not wanted to "risk" hiring an elderly person for fear they may die during filming. When Jorge Drexler accepted the Oscar for Best Original Song in 2005, instead of a speech he sang the winning song, "Al Otro Lado del Río", as he had not been invited to perform earlier in the ceremony.

There is play-off music after an actor has reached their time limit, and there are reminders on the teleprompter. If they take too long, the microphone cuts out. In 2004, Jack Black and Will Ferrell performed a song to the tune of the piece of music, although this was as part of a presentation routine and not during a speech overrun.

There are certain recurring themes in Oscar speeches, particularly in the people thanked. These can range from an actor's agent to the film's director, to their co-stars, to their God, to their idols and to their parents.

== Controversies ==
Some speeches have caused uproar thanks to political and social subject matter like Michael Moore's criticisms of George W. Bush and Vanessa Redgrave's stance on the Israeli–Palestinian conflict.

Sometimes a confusing or ambiguous statement made in a speech have attracted attention in the media. In Angelina Jolie's Best Supporting Actress speech in 2000 for Girl, Interrupted, she said, "I'm so in love with my brother right now", leading to accusations of incest with her brother, actor and producer, James Haven.

In 1973, Marlon Brando famously refused an Oscar due to his support of Native Americans. A part of his speech was read on stage by Sacheen Littlefeather.

== Superlative speeches ==
The longest Oscar speech was given by Adrien Brody at the 97th Academy Awards, after he was named Best Actor for The Brutalist (2024). His speech ran for 5 minutes and 40 seconds. Brody's speech was ten seconds longer than the previous record holder Greer Garson, who was named Best Actress at the 15th Academy Awards for Mrs. Miniver (1942). Following Garson's speech, the Academy set forty-five seconds as the allotted time for an acceptance speech and began to cut the winners off after this time limit.

The shortest Oscar speech has been when recipients simply say "thank you". Both Clark Gable and Alfred Hitchcock kept it simple, and when Patty Duke was named Best Supporting Actress in 1962 for The Miracle Worker at the 35th Academy Awards, her acceptance speech was, simply, two words—"Thank you"— after which she walked off the stage. Similarly, Joe Pesci made a five-word acceptance speech after winning Best Supporting Actor for Goodfellas at the 63rd Academy Awards: "It’s my privilege. Thank you."

== See also ==
- Oscar bait
- List of Academy Award records
- Oscar season
