= Kattunayakan =

Scheduled tribe in four Indian states

Kattunayakar
Regions with significant populations
- Tamil Nadu, Karnataka, Kerala, Andhra Pradesh

Languages
- Dravidian languages

Religion
- Hinduism

Related ethnic groups
- Dravidian; Malayali people; Tamil people; Kannada people

Kattunayakan (also Kattunayakar) or Jenu Kuruba is a designated scheduled tribe in the Indian states of Tamil Nadu, Karnataka, Kerala, and Andhra Pradesh. The word means 'king of the jungle' in Tamil and Malayalam. They are one of the earliest known inhabitants of the Western Ghats, who are engaged in the collection and gathering of forest produce, mainly wild honey and wax.

The men wear short dhotis and half-sleeved shirts. The women attach a long single piece of cloth round their body just below the neck, leaving the shoulders and arms bare. Child marriages were common before the 1990s, but now the girls marry after attaining puberty. Monogamy is the general rule among the community.

On 12 March 2023, an Indian production documentary that follows the people of this tribe as they look after and nurture abandoned elephants, The Elephant Whisperers, won the Academy Award for Best Documentary Short Film.

Kattunayakan believe in Hinduism and speak a language which is a mixture of all Dravidian languages. They also worship animals, birds, trees, rock hillocks, and snakes, along with the other Hindu deities. The main deity of the tribe is Lord Shiva and Nayakkar under the name of Bhairava. Kattunayakars are fond of music, songs, and dancing. They are also called Cholanaickar and Pathinaickars.

== Jenu Kuruba ==
In 1982, Kattunayakan and Jenu Kuruba were considered as two different tribes. In a 1988 study, several members of the Kattunayakan considered their tribe to be the same as the Jenu Kuruba tribe.

== Kerala ==
Kattunayakan are one of the five ancient tribal groups in Kerala. They live very much in tune with nature. Hunting and collecting forest produce are the two main means of living for the Kattunayakan tribe. However, the restrictions to protect native forest and wildlife have forced them to find work outside the forests. Although willing to work for very low wages, unemployment and poverty are very severe among the Kattunayakan. Another important factor for the tribe is the medicinal system and its close association with the culture. They use traditional medicines for common ailments, but they use modern medicines in an emergency. Even then they only use modern medicine after seeking consent from "God" by the chieftain or priest (generally both roles are taken by the same person), through a well-defined set of traditional rituals or poojas.
