= Jangura Habba =

Kannada festival

Jangura Habba is festival is celebrated by the Haaruva clan of Badagas belonging to the hatties of B.Manihatty, Thangadu, Puduhatty, Melur-hosahatty and Manhaaruva clan Haadatty. Jangura in native Badaga language is "Sacred thread". Habba means festival.

Jangura Habba means "sacred thread festival".
