= Thangadu =

Thangadu Village is a Badaga village in the Nilgiri District of Tamil Nadu, India. Thangadu is 18 km to the south west of Ooty, the district capital of the Nilgiris.
