= Timothy A. Gonsalves =

Indian computer scientist (born 1954)

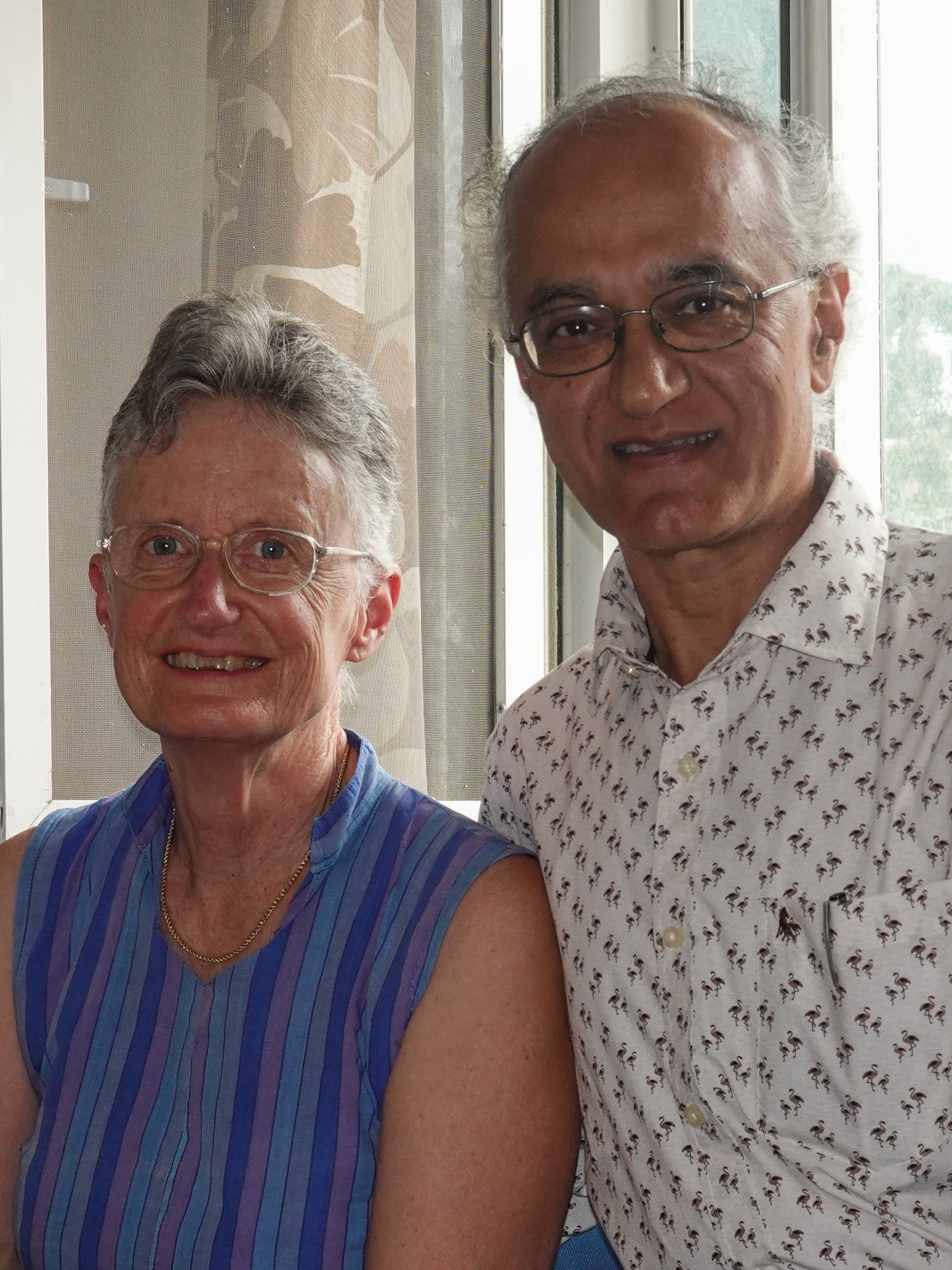
- Gonsalves (right) with his wife, Priscilla, in 2019

Founding Director of IIT Mandi
- In office 15 January 2010 – 30 June 2020
- Preceded by: Position Established
- Succeeded by: Laxmidhar Behera

Personal details
- Born: June 20, 1954 (age 72) Ooty, Nilgiris District, Tamil Nadu, India
- Spouse: Priscilla Tapley Gonsalves
- Children: 2, including Kartiki
- Education: Stanford University; Rice University; IIT Madras
- Profession: Professor, Administrator
- Website: www.ptag.in

Timothy Aloysius Gonsalves (born 20 June 1954) is an Indian computer scientist and professor. During his academic career, he has been founder/co-founder of several institutions and companies. These include founder of Nilgiri Networks (P) Ltd, co-founder of NMSWorks Software (P) Ltd, co-founder of the TeNeT Group and RTBI at IIT Madras, and IIT Mandi Catalyst. Most notably, he was the founding Director of IIT Mandi in the Himalayan state of Himachal Pradesh from Jan. 2010 to Jun. 2020. He is currently Professor Emeritus (Honorary) at IIT Mandi. His academic interests include education for engineers of the future, computer networks, distributed systems, telecom software and performance evaluation among others.

== Early life and education ==
Gonsalves was born into a Mangalorean Catholic family on 20 June 1954, in Ooty, Nilgiris in Tamil Nadu. He graduated from Breeks Memorial School, Ooty in 1969. He completed B.Tech. (Electronics), IIT Madras, 1976. He went to the US for graduate studies, receiving an M.S. (Electrical Engineering) from Rice University, Houston in 1979 and Ph.D. from Stanford University in 1986.

== Early career ==
After receiving his PhD, Gonsalves served as an Assistant Professor in the Computer Science Department at Worcester Polytechnic Institute from July 1986 to December 1988. He returned to India and joined the Department of Computer Science and Engineering, IIT Madras as Assistant Professor in January 1989.

During his PhD, Gonsalves had done early research on the then novel idea of transmitting voice over Ethernet. Besides simulation studies, he conducted measurements on an early Ethernet LAN at Xerox PARC that established the capability of this data network to also transmit voice. In the first decade of his academic career, he broadened his research on LANs to include the transport layer and operating systems.

== Technology for society ==
In the early 1990s, Gonsalves with two colleagues Ashok Jhunjhunwala and Bhaskar Ramamurthi decided to focus their research on technology for mass use in India. They founded the TeNeT Group with its motto “World-class technology at an affordable price”. Gonsalves worked on the software design of a number of telecom products. These include the corDECT Wireless in Local Loop system, a product of Midas Comm, the DIAS Direct Internet Access System, a product of Banyan Networks, with its patented soft-switching design among others.

To deliver useful applications based on the Internet, he was a co-founder of n-Logue Communications and the IIT-M RTBI. In 1998-2000, he founded Nilgiri Networks (P) Ltd. while on leave from Madras in his small hometown of Ooty. He trained local talent to develop telecom software for the TeNeT Group. This included Minnow, a Linux-based server for small ISPs, and BlueBill, a low-cost telecom billing package. Based on many years of research in network management systems he co-founded NMSWorks Software (P) Ltd and designed its flagship product, CygNet. (Note: D. M. Divakaran; H. A. Murthy; T. A. Gonsalves (2006). Traffic Modeling and Classification Using Packet Train Length and Packet Train Size. International Workshop on IP Operations and Management. Dublin, Ireland: IEEE. doi:10.1007/11908852_1. (Best Paper Award)) Working with several companies incubated by RTBI on Internet-based products for rural India, his research interests further broadened to include distributed systems.

From about 2006 onwards, he worked on financial systems as a consultant to SBI and SEBI. He led the development of the first standards for mobile payments in India as a member of the Mobile Payment Forum India (MPFI).

During the decade following 2010, he started to apply machine learning and data science to diverse fields such as computer networks and agriculture. He developed an interest in data-driven speculations on the future.

== Institution Building: Founding Director, IIT Mandi ==
Prof. Gonsalves took charge as the first full-time Director of IIT Mandi in January 2010. Under his leadership, IIT Mandi grew from an Institute with only 97 students in 2009 to one with 1655 students (2019–20) that has graduated over 1500 alumni. It has a vibrant research culture, with 125 faculty. As of 2020, the Institute had brought in external research funding to the tune of Rs. 110 Cr.

From a green-field project initiated in 2009, IIT Mandi has 1.4 lakh sq. mt. constructed space with residential, academic and recreational facilities at par with the best higher education institutions in India.

In the National Framework Institute Ranking of the Government of India (2019), IIT Mandi was ranked 20th among engineering colleges in India, and best Institute among all categories in Himachal Pradesh. In the ARIIA 2020 it was ranked 7th in a nationwide survey. Within a decade of its establishment, IIT Mandi earned praise, including from the Indian Vice-President, and the Governor and Chief Minister of Himachal Pradesh, for establishing its unique identity in the education map of the country.

Prof. Gonsalves was instrumental in setting up IIT Mandi Catalyst, the first technology business incubator in Himachal Pradesh, in 2016. He served as the Chairman of its Board of Governors. Catalyst has helped over 370 startups since 2017, and is changing both the industry profile and entrepreneurial mindset in Himachal Pradesh. As of June 2020, Catalyst had secured external funding of Rs. 24 Cr from various funding agencies.

In 2019, IIT Mandi became the first IIT to introduce a B. Tech. programme in Data Science. Prof. Gonsalves has mentored other educational institutes in Himachal Pradesh by serving on their board. He has served as the Vice-Chairman of the State Higher Education Council, Himachal Pradesh (2014 – 2017), and as Chairman of the Board of Governors for Jawaharlal Nehru Government Engineering College (2012 – 2017).

Prof. Gonsalves was appointed the National Project Coordinator for FarmerZone, a project that harnesses artificial intelligence for crop management advisories to small and medium farmers, initially helping over 1000 potato farmers in Punjab, Uttar Pradesh and Himachal Pradesh. This prestigious project was funded to the tune of Rs. 9.7 cr (2018-2021) by the Indian Department of Biotechnology. Another example of IIT Mandi achieving national leadership during his tenure: in 2018 IIT Mandi was nominated as the nodal institution for Germany in the nationwide SPARC (international researchers’ mobility) programme of Ministry of Human Resource Development.

In keeping with IIT Mandi’s vision to bridge the gap between academia and the local community, Prof. Gonsalves initiated ‘Prayas’, a citizen’s forum with residents and administrators in Mandi town, and served as its Chairman.

=== Initiative to increase female enrollment in the Indian Institutes of Technology ===
In 2017 he chaired the Joint Admissions Board sub-committee for increasing female enrollment in B.Tech. at IITs. The committee recommended an increase in female enrollment in IITs from 8% in 2016 to 14% in 2018-19, 17% in 2019-20 and 20% in 2020-21 by creating supernumerary seats. As a result of this and other efforts at IIT Mandi including scholarships for female students and the setting up of a help-desk, IIT Mandi surpassed this target by achieving 20.22% female admissions to its B. Tech programme for the Academic Year, with 53 female students among 262 total program admissions. This was the highest proportion of female students in a BTech programme in any of the 23 IITs. This effort has been a national success as well: female enrollment in BTech at all IITs more than doubled from 8% in 2016 to 18% in 2019.

=== Five Week Induction Programme for BTech Students ===
Since 2016, under Prof. Gonsalves' leadership, IIT Mandi has organized a fully faculty-mentored induction or orientation programme for its new BTech students. The aim of this five-week programme is to provide training to the new students and help them in the transition from school to college, to improve their respective skills and proficiency, and to help them to appreciate the significance of engineering’s societal connection.

=== Retirement from IIT Mandi ===
After over 10 years of his contributions as founding Director of IIT Mandi, Prof. Gonsalves stepped down on 30 June 2020. Thereafter, Ajit Kumar Chaturvedi, Director of IIT Roorkee, took additional charge as Director of IIT Mandi temporarily. Prof. Gonsalves continues his association with IIT Mandi as Professor Emeritus (Honorary) since 1 July 2020. In February 2021, IIT Mandi published a book Scaling the Heights: IIT Mandi's First Decade chronicling the growth of the institution from inception until 2019 under his leadership.

== Career after retirement ==
After his retirement as Director of IIT Mandi in June 2020, Prof. Gonsalves has been active in improving education for engineering colleges in India. He founded the LEAP (Learning Engineering by Activity with Products) programme in 2021. LEAP brings project-based learning to students in the first and second years of their BTech programme.

He is a founding member of the Steering Committee of the CSEDU programme aimed at improving the effectiveness of teaching of computer science subjects in colleges. He leads the team on Effective Teaching of Computer Networks.

In 2022, Prof. Gonsalves was named AICTE Distinguished Chair Professor. In this capacity, he visits engineering colleges in different parts of India to deliver expert lectures and to mentor faculty and students. His first visit, in November 2022, was to the G. Narayanamma Institute of Technology and Science, Hyderabad.

== Personal life ==
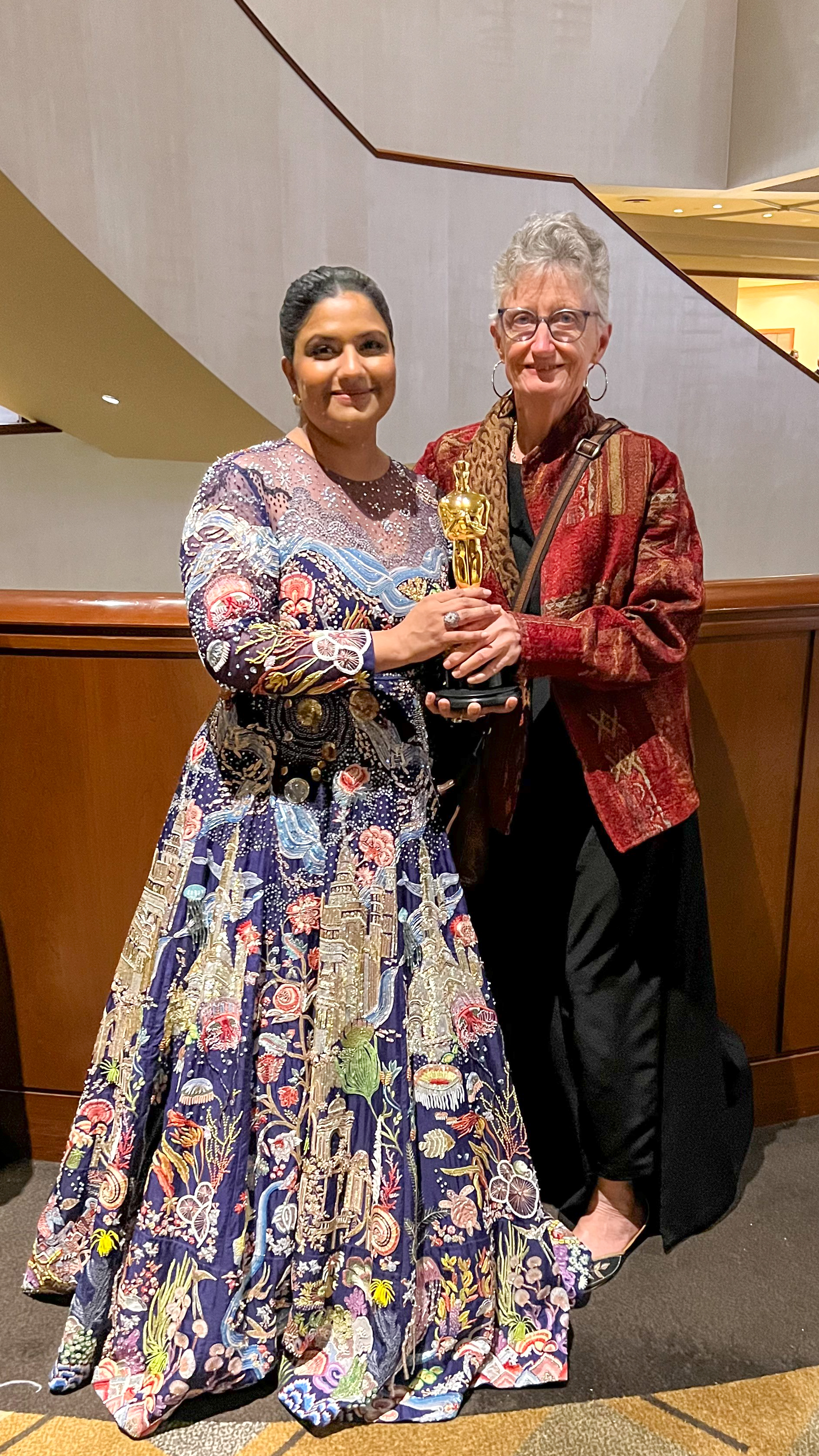
Kartiki Gonsalves (daughter, left) and Priscilla Tapley Gonsalves (wife, right) at the 95th Academy Awards, 2023.

Gonsalves is married to Priscilla Tapley Gonsalves and has two daughters, Danica Gonsalves and Kartiki Gonsalves. The documentary The Elephant Whisperers directed by Kartiki Gonsalves and written by Priscilla Gonsalves, won the Academy Award 2022 for Best Documentary Short Film.

After retirement as IIT Mandi Director, he has been leading the IIT Mandi Wikimedians, a group of Wiki editors/contributors from IIT Mandi. They contribute photos and articles on Himachal to Commons and Wikipedia. He is an avid photographer and several of his images have been featured on Wikimedia Commons, and selected as Picture of the Day on Commons and Bengali Wikipedia.
