= Achanakal =

Coordinates: 11°22′53″N 76°43′19″E

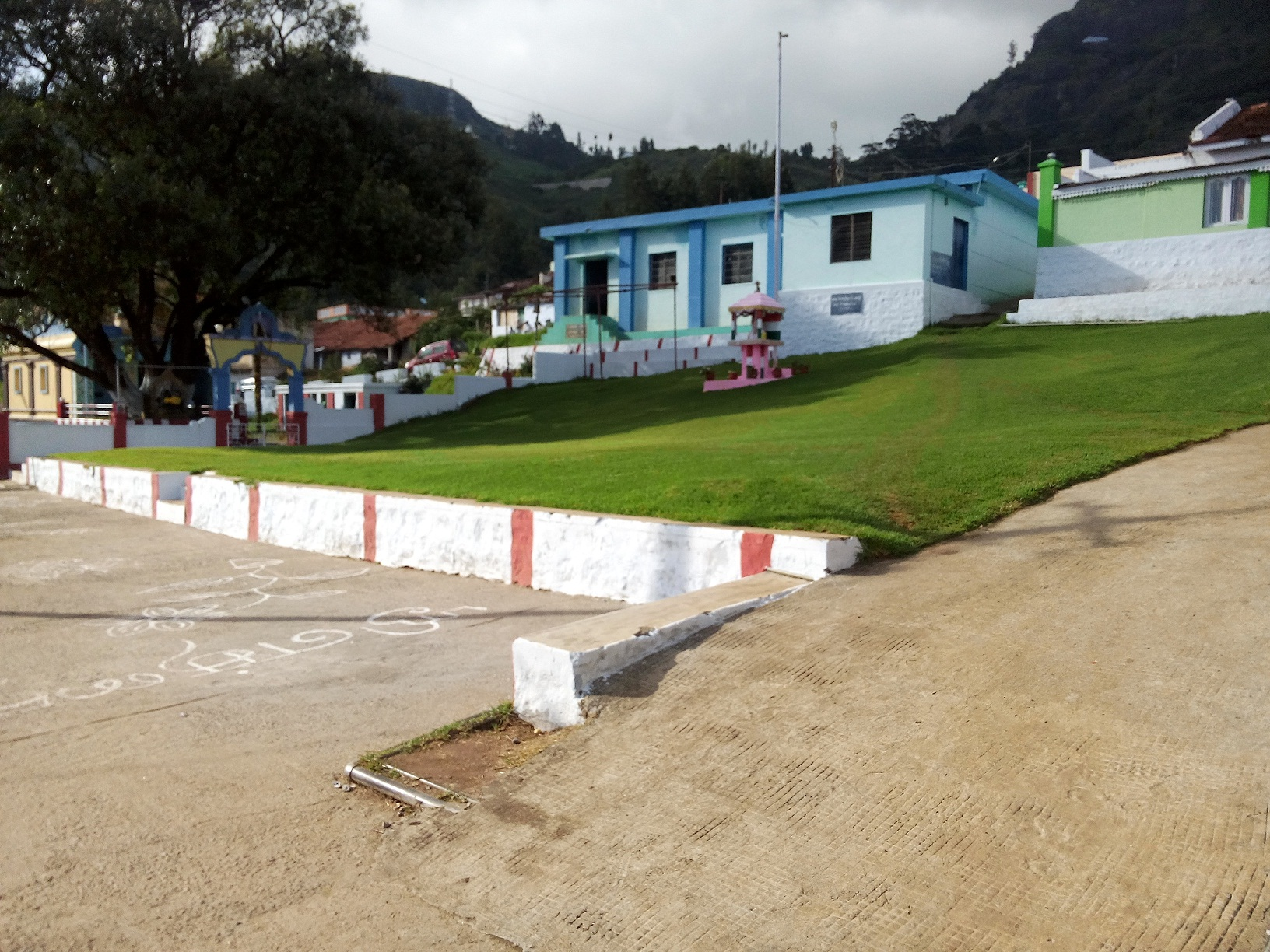
Heart of the village

Achanakal is a Badaga village in the Nilgiris district in the Indian state of Tamil Nadu. The village is located adjacent to the Coonoor-Ooty highway in the Ketti valley. The name is believed to be derived from asinikol meaning bamboo sticks in Badaga language which formed the place before the village came into existence. Ketti valley is also considered the second steepest valley in the world. Achanakal is the largest village among the other 13 villages which are located in the valley. The village is just 3 Kilometres away from Ketti and the Lovedale railway stations.

== Demographics ==
The village is home to 400 families. Melatty, Manapattu and the Main hatti make the village. The village is known for its celebrations of the festivals Maari Habba and Huri Habba. The Maari Habba is celebrated once in a year in the month of March or April for three days.

== Community ==
Achanakal has a football club, Union Club Achanakal, and is known for its sports. Some players have represented Tamil Nadu state and the India National football team. Achanakal has also produced military personnel who have served in the Indian Army.
