= Maundadan Chetti language =

Kannadoid language of India

Maundadan Chetti
- Native to: India
- Region: Nilgiris, Tamil Nadu
- Native speakers: 5,400 (2020)
- Language family: Dravidian: Southern; Southern I; Tamil–Kannada; Kannada–Badaga; Kannadoid; Maundadan Chetti
- Writing system: speakers use Tamil script (majority) and Malayalam script

Language codes
- ISO 639-3: cty
- Glottolog: maun1243 Maundadan Chetti

Maundadan Chetti (IPA: [mɐu̯ɳɖɐd̪ɐn t͡ʃeʈːi]) or Chetti is a Kannadoid Southern Dravidian language of India spoken by Maundadan Chetti community in the Nilgiri district of Tamil Nadu and in the Wayanad district of Kerala, India. Its highest lexical similarity is with Badaga, which one calculation put at 57%, and it has somewhat lower similarities (47%–41%) with Kannada, Malayalam, Tamil and Wayanadan Chetti.
