= Jenu Kurumba language =

Dravidian language spoken in India

Jenu Kurumba
- ஜென்னு குரும்பா
- Native to: India
- Region: Karnataka, Tamil Nadu, Kerala
- Native speakers: 100,000 (2011 census)
- Language family: Dravidian: Southern; Southern I; Tamil–Kannada; Badaga–Kannada; Kannadoid; Jenu Kurumba
- Writing system: Tamil script

Language codes
- ISO 639-3: xuj
- Glottolog: jenn1240 Jennu

Jenu Kurumba (IPA: [d͡ʒeːnu kurumbɐ]), also known as Jen Kurumba or Jennu Kurumba, is a Southern Dravidian language of the Tamil–Kannada subgroup spoken by the Jenu Kuruba/Kattunayakan tribe. It is often considered to constitute a dialect of Kannada; however, Ethnologue classifies it as a separate language. Jenu Kurumba speakers are situated on the Nilgiri Hills cross-border area between Tamil Nadu and Karnataka, Mysore and Kodagu districts of Karnataka, and Wayanad district of Kerala. The speakers of the language call it "nama basha" (transl. our language).

== See also ==
- Betta Kurumba language
- Alu Kurumba language
- Dravidian languages
- List of languages by number of native speakers in India
- Languages of South Asia

== Sources ==
- Zvelebil, Kamil V. (1988), Jēnu Kuṟumba: Brief Report on a "Tribal" Language of the Nilgiri Area, Journal of the American Oriental Society
