= Sundatty =

Sundatty is one of the subdivisions of Yedakadu in south India.
