= Alu Kurumba language =

Southern Dravidian language of India

Alu Kurumba
- ஆலுக் குறும்பா
- Native to: India
- Region: Tamil Nadu
- Native speakers: 2,400 (2019)
- Language family: Dravidian: Southern; Southern I; Tamil–Kannada; Badaga–Kannada; Kannadoid; Alu Kurumba

Language codes
- ISO 639-3: xua
- Glottolog: aluk1238
- ELP: Alu Kurumba

Alu Kurumba (IPA: [aːlu kurumbɐ]), also known as Hal Kurumba or alternatively Pal Kurumba, is a Southern Dravidian language of the Tamil–Kannada subgroup spoken by the Alu Kurumba tribal people. It is often considered to constitute a dialect of Kannada; however, Ethnologue classifies it as a separate language. Alu Kurumba speakers are situated on the Nilgiri Hills cross-border area between Tamil Nadu and Karnataka.

== See also ==
- Betta Kurumba language
- Jennu Kurumba language
- Dravidian languages
- List of languages by number of native speakers in India
- Languages of South Asia
