= Camilla Rutherford (photographer) =

Scottish photojournalist

Camilla Rutherford (Stoddart)
- Born: 7 August 1983 (age 42); Edinburgh, Scotland, United Kingdom
- Occupation: Photojournalist
- Known for: Photography
- Spouse: Tim Rutherford
- Website: www.camillarutherford.co.nz

Camilla Rutherford (born 7 August 1983) is a Scottish photojournalist who lives in Wānaka, New Zealand. Rutherford specializes in outdoor sports photography and often shoots in the mountains of New Zealand. She shoots subjects related to sports, travel, and lifestyle.

== Personal ==
Rutherford was born in Edinburgh, Scotland, on 7 August 1983, to a family of five children. She later became a skiing instructor. She studied at St. Martin's College of Art in London where she earned an Arts Honors Degree. Rutherford traveled to the South Island of New Zealand and moved to Wānaka. She married Tim Rutherford and has a son. Before she moved to Wānaka, she alternated between Verbier, Switzerland and Wānaka so that she could live in both the southern and northern hemispheres. After she married Tim she moved to his farm in Tarras. She settled down officially in Wānaka, citing the scenery as her reasoning. Rutherford shoots mostly in the mountains of New Zealand, saying that "beautiful things happen when people and the mountains meet."

== Career ==
Camilla Rutherford worked as a freelance photographer in Wānaka, New Zealand shown here relative to the capital city of Wellington.

Rutherford grew up in Scotland and has worked as a freelance photographer since graduating from St. Martin's College in London, with a major in Theatre Design. Her background in theatre led to her interest in photography and her love of skiing. She started her career life as a ski instructor, and later became a photographer, launching her website in 2009. The Faction Collective ski company advertised her website to their users to promote her work. Rutherford left her home in Scotland to go to New Zealand to continue her love of skiing. She started taking photographs with an iPhone 4 before getting a Canon camera. She shot them in the winter for four years before moving to Wānaka, and shooting her first summer photos there. Using a Canon 5D Mark 3 camera, she claims that capturing the athletes in their element is the most critical part in telling the story within the picture. The landscapes and terrain in Wānaka help produce her work. "It can be as simple as someone standing admiring a vista, not even doing anything extreme but simply taking it all in, and this gives a whole new meaning to the photo", Rutherford says. Vimeo made a slideshow to display her work. Many of her pictures have been published in travel magazines all over the world. Air New Zealand used her pictures in their advertisements in Sydney and Melbourne's Central train stations as part of an ad campaign for Air NZ. Rutherford is supported by F-Stop Gear, Peak Design, Cecilia Gallery, Smith Optics and Faction Skis.

== Notable works of photography ==
- Red Bull Competition in 2010
- Scandinavian Photo Challenge by Nikon in 2011
- Pro Photographer Showdown finalist in 2012
- New Zealand Geographic Photographer of the Year finalist in 2013
- Outside Magazine's Best Travel photography in 2014
- New Zealand Press Photographer of the Year in 2015
- World's best female action sports photographers by Still Stoked
- New Zealand Geographic Photographer of the Year finalist in 2018

== Impact ==
The Outdoor Journal wrote that female photographers like Rutherford and several others challenged ideas about what women could do in what had been a previously male dominated area of outdoor adventure and sport photography.

"Photographing people in landscapes is a passion of mine. I guess that's why I love shooting adventure sports," says Rutherford.

== Reactions ==
Seb Kemp, one of the judges, said of Rutherford's winning submission for the Scandinavian Photo Challenge, "Her show was a stunning show where every photo was a scorcher, the edit was well timed and balanced, and there was plenty of story and narrative in the slideshow. All judges were unanimous that hers was the top show. Judging by the reactions from the audience, we obviously made the right choice."

== Awards ==
Rutherford was a finalist in the Wings category of the Red Bull Competition in 2010, shooting BASE jumper Josie Symons in Mt. Aspiring National Park. In 2011, Rutherford got together with a group of mountain bike photographers in Are, Sweden, for the Scandinavian Photo Challenge by Nikon, which she won. She was featured in the Exposure section of Outside Magazine in 2011. Rutherford appeared as a finalist in the Pro Photographer Showdown in 2012. She was also a finalist in the New Zealand Geographic Photographer of the Year in 2013. Rutherford was featured in Outside Magazine's Best Travel photography in 2014 with a picture of moonlight bliss in New Zealand. Rutherford was one of the winners of the 2015 New Zealand Press Photographer of the Year. Her photos were displayed as part of an exhibition by The Botanist in Auckland on 9 December 2015. Rutherford was also voted one of the world's best female action sports photographers by Still Stoked. In 2018, she was a finalist in the New Zealand Geographic Photographer of the Year.
