= Koraga people =

Tribal community in Karnataka

Koraga
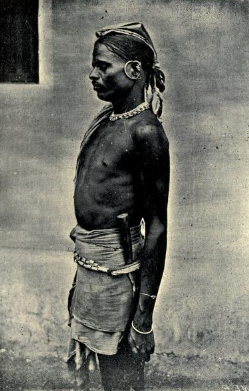
- A Koraga tribesman, ca. 1909.

Total population
- 16,376 (2011 census)

Regions with significant populations
- India
- Karnataka: 14,794
- Kerala: 1,582

Languages
- Koraga language, Kannada, Tulu, Malayalam

The Koraga are a tribal community or indigenous community found mainly in the Dakshina Kannada, Udupi districts of Karnataka and the Kasaragod district of Kerala, south India. These areas in Karnataka, are altogether often referred to as Tulunaad, which roughly corresponds to the boundaries of the erstwhile South Canara district. They are also found in small numbers in adjoining districts of Uttara Kannada, Shimoga and Kodagu. The Koraga are classified by the Government of India as a particularly vulnerable tribal group.

The Koraga, who numbered 16,071 according to the 2001 census of India, have their own language, classified as an independent Dravidian language.

== Social status ==
The 1901 census report noted the Koraga as being a lowly tribe of basket-makers and labourers, some of whom were employed as scavengers. They remain today among the untouchables, being considered as ritually polluted by Hindus, but there have in the past been claims that they are of Chandala stock. Their folklore claims Hubbashika to have been one of their chiefs but the Kadamba narrative asserts a Chandala origin, that they are the descendants of the offspring of a Brahman woman and a Shudra father. Edgar Thurston quotes M. T. Walhouse, who wrote in 1875 that this narrative was recorded by Brahmans and that, together with the Kapata, the Koraga were the lowest of the fifteen Chandala groups. However, Thurston thinks it probable that they were in fact the aboriginals of the region who were dispersed, dispossessed and turned into slaves by the influx of Aryans from the north of India. but this narrative lack reliability

The area in which they live comprises mostly agricultural land and forest and the tribe continue to make use of the forest produce—principally, bamboo and creepers—for the manufacture of baskets today. They traditionally lived in structures made of leaves, called koppus and also dressed in leaves. Around the beginning of the 21st century, they started to live in simple free houses constructed and sanctioned by Government agencies, but some of them are still either homeless or live on government-owned lands.

=== Ajalu practice ===
Koraga people have been subjected to a practice known as ajalu, which the Government of Karnataka defined as "differentiating Koraga people and persons belonging to other communities, treating them as inferior human beings, mixing hair, nails and other inedible abnoxious substances in the food and asking them to eat that food. They were also made to run like buffaloes before the beginning of Kambala." Ajalu has been considered to be inhuman and was prohibited in 2000 by the Karnataka Koragas (Prohibition of Ajalu Practice) Act, 2000. Contravention of the Act is punishable by a term of imprisonment of between six months and five years, as well as a cash penalty. Nonetheless, ajalu has been occasionally witnessed during Nemotsava or temple fairs at places such as Inna (Karkala) and Saligrama, Udupi, leading to Koraga people demanding action against the culprits and the police who failed to prevent it.

== Religion ==
Although an untouchable community, the Koraga regard themselves as Hindus, albeit ones who follow a tribal religious system. Despite being discriminated by other higher ranked groups, they exert a sense of superstitious fear because those groups consider the Koraga to be capable of influencing events through the use of magic and witchcraft. They worship spirits known as Bhutas as well as some devas and a sun god. Although once they practised a form of matrilineal inheritance known as Aliya Santana, the Koraga may now be patrilineal (Makkala Santana). They practice endogamy with regard to their three main subdivisions, the Sappina, Ande and Kappada Koraga. Each of the three subdivisions are further divided into clans known as balis, and they do not marry within their own clan.

== Diet ==
The diet of the Koraga is generally of poor quality because they are poor. They subsist mainly on rice and meats such as pork and beef, although they are increasingly also using produce such as pulses and vegetables. Their meat is often sourced from animals that have died naturally rather than by slaughter. Malnutrition is common among Koraga children due to poor diet and this is something of concern to the Government health authorities. Despite Government schemes designed to improve the nutritional content of their food, the implementation has been poor and Koraga people have sometimes demanded improvements to it.

== Drum beating ==
Koraga people are known for drum beating (dollu or dolu beating) and it is one of their important cultural contributions. They used to beat dolu during events such as Kambala, village fairs or just for fun in their living places. Traditional belief was that Koraga drum-beating had special powers and that the sound of drum-beating drives away evil spirits. However, the practice declined as the drum beaters were looked down upon by society. Attempts are being made to revive the art by forming drum-beating troupes such as Gajamela in Dakshina Kannada, with support from the Government. Such troupes also give performances on occasions like tribal gatherings in coastal Karnataka. Flute music and dance involving both men and women are also important parts of Koraga culture and are apparent at celebrations such as Bhoomi Habba (worshipping earth).

== Education ==
The Koraga people are an educationally disadvantaged tribe but progress is being made. The first PhD to be awarded to a member of the community was reported in 2010 and two other Koragas made headlines in 2012 when they passed the National Eligibility Test (NET) for lectureship conducted by the University Grants Commission.

Government agencies are encouraging improvements in education for Koraga children by opening schools exclusively for their community in villages like Madhya Padavu.

== Support by Government agencies ==
There have been lacklustre attempts, certainly since the 1980s, to alleviate the conditions of the tribe. A Tribal Sub-Plan instigated by the government of Karnataka failed to have any impact, at least in part because the affected tribes were not aware of its existence, and attempts by the Koragas themselves to exert pressure for change from around 1994 met with little success because their very organisation was sponsored by the government whom they were trying to hold to account. C. B. Damle has said that "They still live in the thatched huts in the outskirts of the village and depend on agricultural labour for their livelihood. Most of them are landless labourers though a few continue their traditional skill of basket making. In townships and in cities, they are engaged in scavenging and sweeping jobs."

Government authorities are helping the progress of Koraga people by activities such as granting cultivable lands, cross bred cows etc. Some of the Koraga colonies are developed with concrete lanes, tiled houses, electricity with financial support from District authorities, Taluk and village panchayats.

Government authorities promised low cost concrete houses to all the 1126 Koraga families living in Dakshina Kannada. Residential summer camps are held exclusively for Koraga children by Government agencies, to impart non-curricular and vocational skills.

== Campaign for equality ==
Koraga people have campaigned for equality in the 21st century with the support of organisations like the Koraga Abhivridhi Sanghagala Okkoota (Federation of Koraga Development Associations). Government measures such as those prohibiting ajalu and the affirmative action afforded by the Scheduled Castes and Scheduled Tribes (Prevention of Atrocities) Act, 1989. and the Bonded Labour System (Abolish) Act, 1976 are also significant. In places such as Kokkarne, Koraga people have stopped their practice of drum beating during Kambala fairs on the grounds that they were forced to keep a watch on slush paddy fields for the entire night. They have also complained of forced consumption of alcohol and smoking.

== See also ==
- Jenu Kuruba
- Soliga tribe
