= Kartiki Gonsalves =

Indian filmmaker (born 1986)

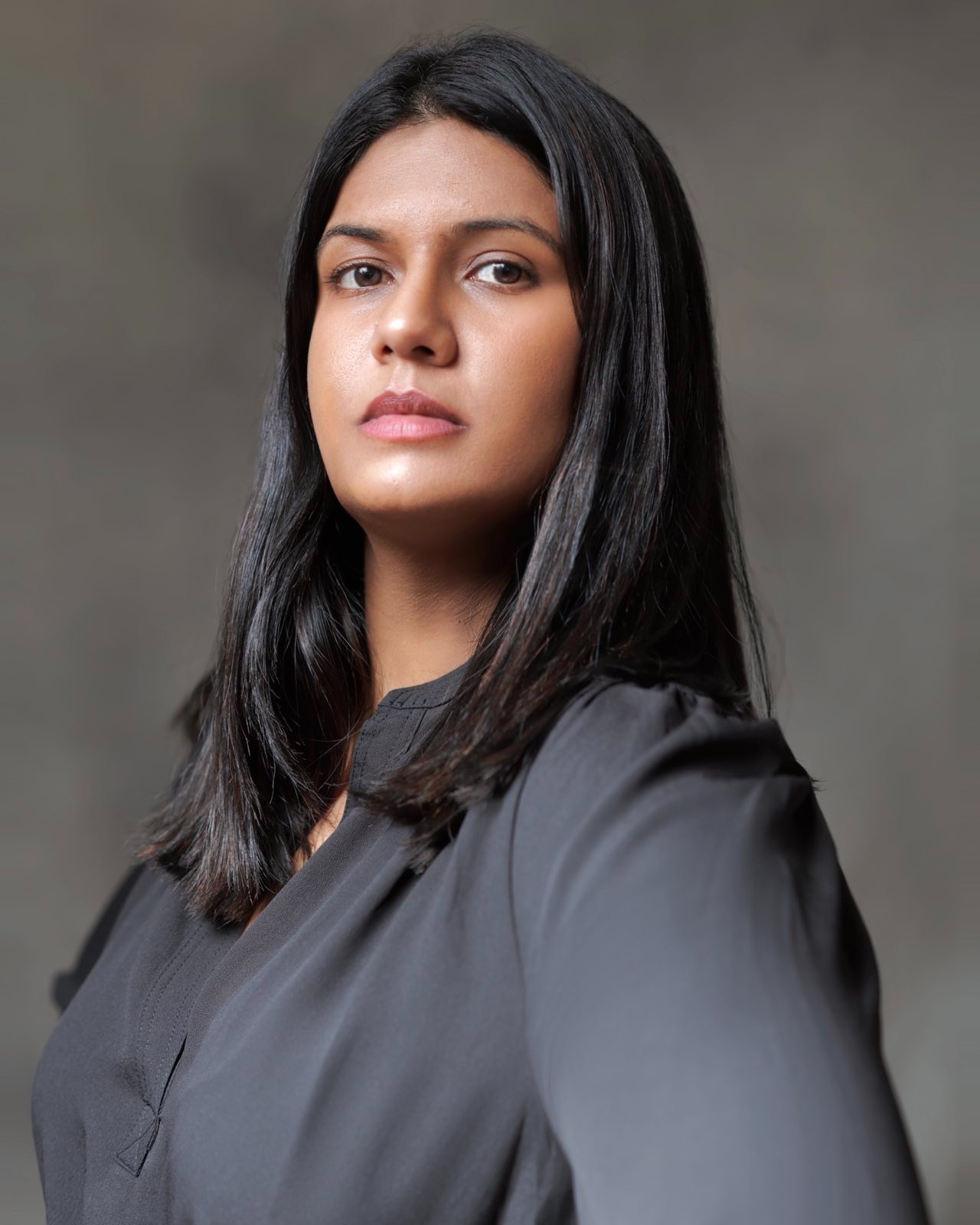
- Gonsalves in 2022
- Born: 2 November 1986 (age 39); Pune, Maharashtra, India
- Education: Dr G R Damodaran College of Science
- Occupations: Director; producer; photographer
- Organization: International League of Conservation Photographers (Associate Fellow)
- Notable work: The Elephant Whisperers (2022, director)
- Parents: Timothy A. Gonsalves; Priscilla Tapley Gonsalves
- Website: kartikigonsalves.com

Kartiki Gonsalves (born 2 November 1986) is an Indian director and producer. In 2023, she won the Best Documentary Short at the 95th Academy Awards for The Elephant Whisperers. She is also one of the first women chosen as a Sony Alpha Artisan of Imagery in India and also associated with brands like Peak Design, Swarovski Optik Nature Explorer 2021.

== Early life and education ==
Kartiki is the younger daughter of Timothy A. Gonsalves and Priscilla Tapley Gonsalves, who is from Binghamton, New York. She has one older sister, Danica Gonsalves. She grew up in Ooty, within the Nilgiri Biosphere reserve in the Nilgiris district of Tamil Nadu.

She studied at the Dr G R Damodaran College of Science in Coimbatore and graduated in 2007, before continuing her studies, focusing on photography at Light & Life Academy, Ooty.

== Career ==
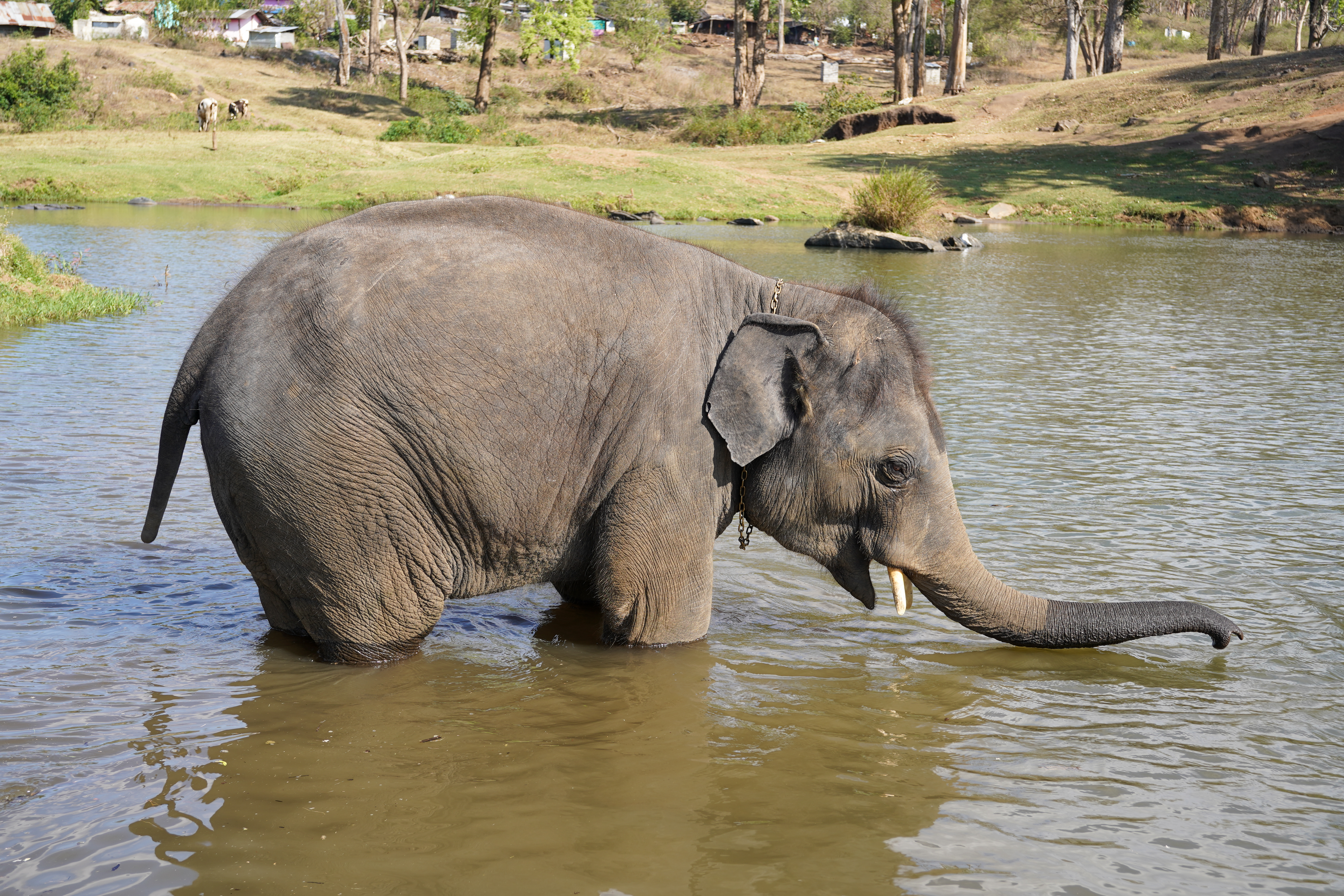
Raghu at Theppakadu Elephant Camp

Gonsalves is a documentary filmmaker and photographer and has worked as a camera operator for Animal Planet and the Discovery Channel. She is the director, co-executive producer and cinematographer of the documentary film The Elephant Whisperers produced by Sikhya Entertainment and acquired and distributed by Netflix. The 39.5-minute documentary was produced at the Mudumalai tiger reserve which is part of the Nilgiri biosphere reserve in Tamil Nadu, 30-minutes from where Gonsalves grew up.

On 13 March 2023, the film won the Academy Award for Best Documentary Short Film at the 95th Academy Awards. It was the first Indian film to win the award.

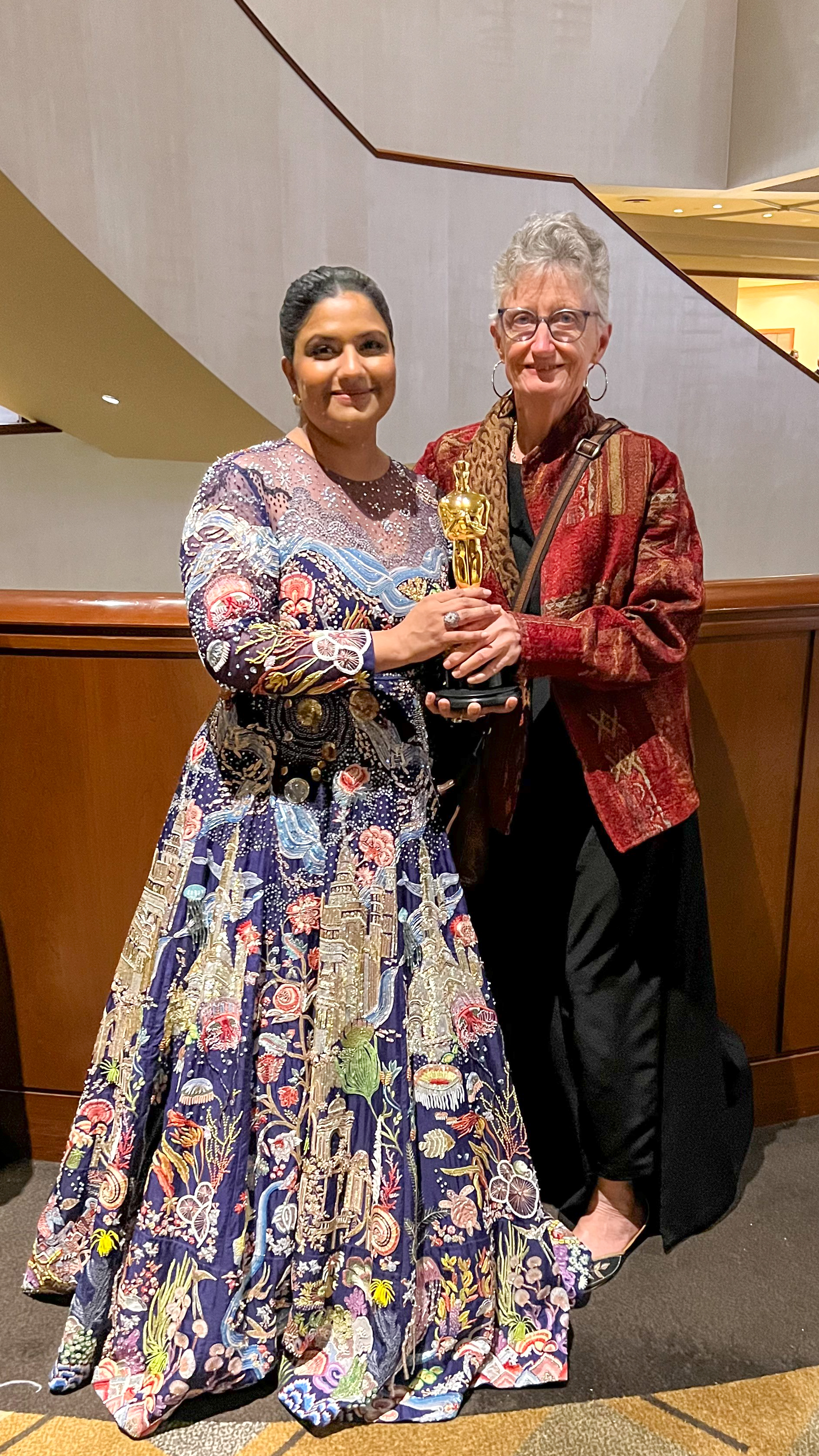
Kartiki and Priscilla Gonsalves at the 95th Academy Awards

Kartiki Gonsalves is a Sony Artisan of Imagery India since 2020, specialising in nature and social documentaries. She gives workshops on nature and wildlife photography and has conducted tours of Bangalore and Mysore cities.

Gonsalves is an International League of Conservation Photographers Associate Fellow.

== Awards ==
Award	Year	Nominated work	Category	Result	Ref.
DOC NYC	2022	The Elephant Whisperers	Shorts: Change Makers	Shortlisted	
95th Academy Awards	2023	The Elephant Whisperers	Best Documentary Short Subject	Won	
Grierson Awards	2023	The Elephant Whisperers	Best Natural History or Environmental Documentary	Shortlisted	

On 28 June 2023 King Charles III and Queen Camilla presented Kartiki with the Elephant Family award called the Tara Award, to recognise her contributions to protecting Asian wildlife.

== See also ==
- Conservation in India
- Tamil Nadu Forest Department
