= Hubbashika =

Koraga chieftain

Hubbashika (also spelled Hubashika) was a Koraga chieftain who ruled coastal areas of Karnataka and Kerala for 12 years during the 15th century CE.

== Period ==
Hubbashika invaded coastal areas of Karnataka when Lokadiraya was ruling at Banavasi. The first historian of Mysore, Colonel Mark Wilks (1759–1831), suggested that the date of Lokidiraya was 1450 CE.

== Place ==
Hubbashika ruled from a place above the Western Ghats (present-day Malenadu) and mobilised an army from this area to invade coastal areas.

== Heroics ==
Hubbashika was believed to have defeated king Mayuravarman and established a Koraga Kingdom; later Mayuravarman's nephew Lokadithya avenged the defeat in a battle fought near Manjeshwar when he defeated and drove Hubbashika and his people into the forests. A slightly different version of his heroics states that, Hubbashika mobilised army of Chandalas and low-caste people from above Western Ghat region (that is present day Malenadu) and invaded Mangalore and Manjeshwara. He defeated Angaravarma, King of Manjeshwar and ruled Manjeshwara for 12 years along with his son. He is also considered as a "hero of slave community".

- There was some effort to find connection between "Habshis" or Abyssinians with Hubbashika, but could not be established due to lack of evidence.

== End of Koraga kingdom ==
Hubbashika and his son were murdered during a wholesale massacre executed by rivals during a special dinner arranged in connection with marriage in the royal family and the remaining members of royal family and their community were made slaves by law and driven into the forest.

== See also ==
- Koraga people
- Korana kote
