= Yedakadu =

Yedakadu Edakadu
- village
- Nickname: Sokku Town
- Interactive map of Yedakadu
- Coordinates: 11.296356°N 76.637661°E
- Country: India
- State: Tamil Nadu
- District: Nilgiris

Population
  - Total: 2,000

Languages
  - Official: Tamil
- Time zone: UTC+5:30 (IST)
- PIN: 643209
- Telephone code: 0423
- Vehicle registration: TN-43
- Coastline: 0 kilometres (0 mi)
- Nearest city: Udhagamandalam
- Lok Sabha constituency: Nilgiris

Yedakadu (also known as Edakadu) is a small hamlet located in the Nilgiris Hills in the state of Tamil Nadu in South India. Yedakadu is located 26 km from Udhagamandalam (Ooty) and 38 km from Coonoor.

The major occupation of the people is tea plantation. Yedakadu is popular for its 'Sivarathiri' (Lord Shiva Festival), an annual carnival which draws a large crowd from around the Nilgiris. Badaga is the primary native language.
