= Holiya language =

Language

Holiya
- Native to: India
- Region: Madhya Pradesh, Maharashtra, Gujarat
- Native speakers: 500 (2002 survey)
- Language family: Dravidian: Southern; Southern I; Tamil–Kannada; Kannada–Badaga; Kannadoid; Holiya

Language codes
- ISO 639-3: hoy
- Glottolog: holi1239

Holiya (Golari, IPA: [holijɐ]) is a southern Dravidian language closely related to Kannada.

It was spoken by about 3,614 persons in Nagpur and Bhandara districts of Maharashtra (Vidarbha) and Seoni and Balaghat districts of Madhya Pradesh as per 1901 census.
