= Koderi =

Coordinates: 11°56′N 75°33′E

Koderi is one among the Badaga Hattis, or hamlets of the Nilgiri hills, located in Tamil Nadu, India, at a distance of 15 km (9.3 mi) from Coonoor and 20 kilometers from Ooty. Koderi is a part of the mekku nadu seeme, one of the four seemes of the Nakku Betta ("four mountains"). Koderi itself is divided into two smaller hattis, namely, Mel Koderi (Upper Koderi) and Kil/Kiye Koderi (Lower Koderi). The nearest picnic spot from Koderi is Kodaparai which is famous for its rock temple in which the rock resembles the shape of an umbrella.

The Koderi Postal Pin Code is 643213.

The primary occupation of the Koderi people is tea plantation. Khenda habba is the main festival of Mel Koderi. On this day the people of this hatti wear the sacred jangura thread. They pray to Shiva and seek his blessings. Mari Abba, the festival of goddess Mari, takes place in Kiye Koderi annually. Hethai Habba is the important festival in kiye koderi.
