= The Elephant Whisperers =

2022 short documentary film by Kartiki Gonsalves

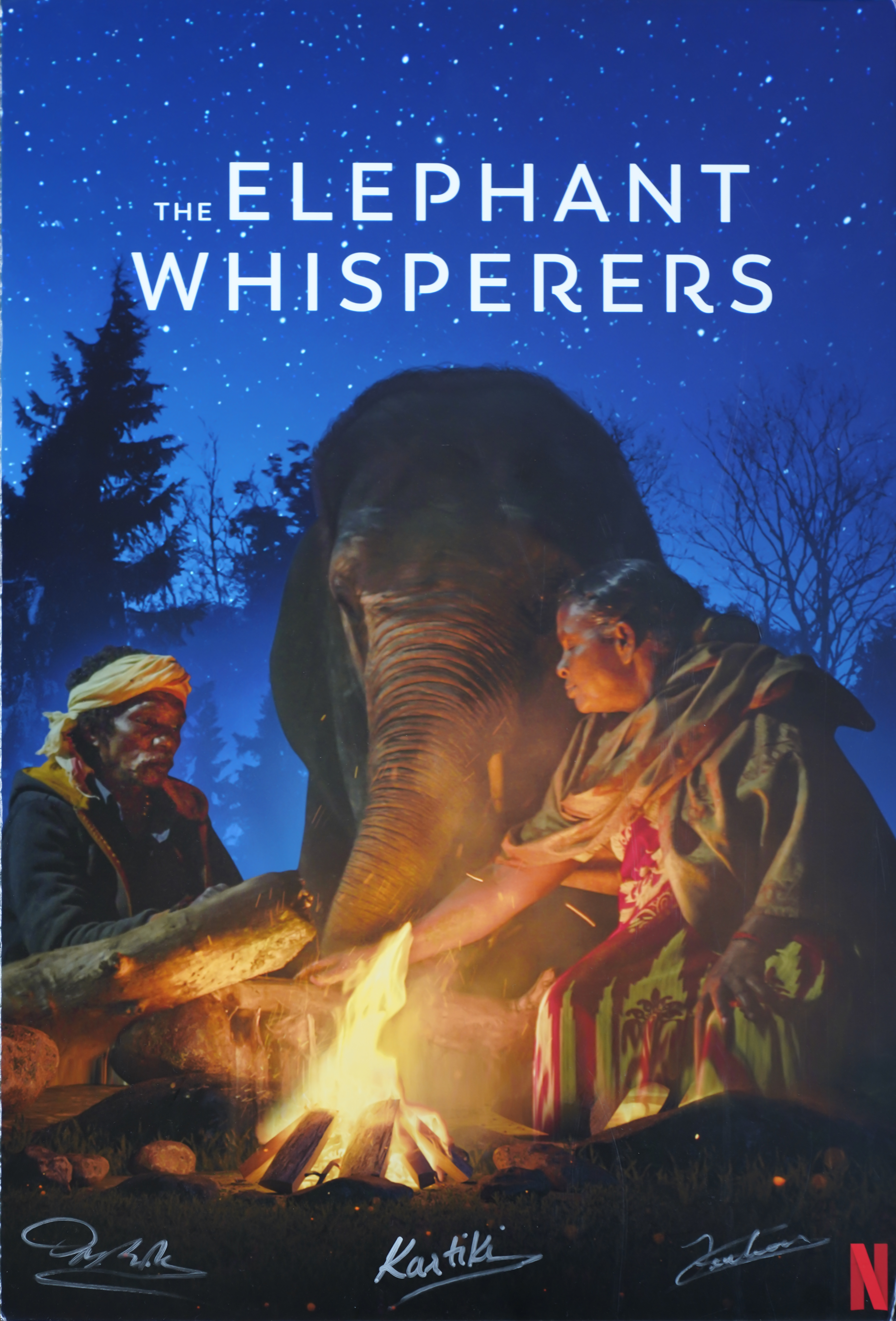
- Official release poster
- Directed by: Kartiki Gonsalves
- Produced by: Guneet Monga; Achin Jain
- Cinematography: Karan Thapliyal; Krish Makhija; Anand Bansal; Kartiki Gonsalves
- Edited by: Sanchari Das Mollick; Douglas Blush
- Music by: Sven Faulconer
- Production company: Sikhya Entertainment
- Distributed by: Netflix
- Release date: 8 December 2022
- Running time: 39 minutes
- Countries: India; United States
- Languages: Tamil; Jenu Kurumba (Note: Bomman and Bellie also speak the language of the Kattunayakan tribe, which is a mixture of Kannada, Malayalam and Tamil.)

The Elephant Whisperers is a 2022 Indian short documentary film directed by Kartiki Gonsalves. The documentary is about the bond that develops between a couple and an orphaned baby elephant, Raghu, who was entrusted to their care. The film is produced by Mumbai based production house Sikhya Entertainment, led by Guneet Monga Kapoor and Achin Jain.

The film had its world premiere on 9 November 2022 at Doc NYC Film Festival, a film festival for documentaries in the United States, and globally released for streaming by Netflix on 8 December 2022. It won the Academy Award for Best Documentary Short Film at the 95th Academy Awards, making it the first Indian film to win an Academy Award in that category, surpassing other nominees such as Stranger at the Gate and How Do You Measure a Year?.

== Plot ==
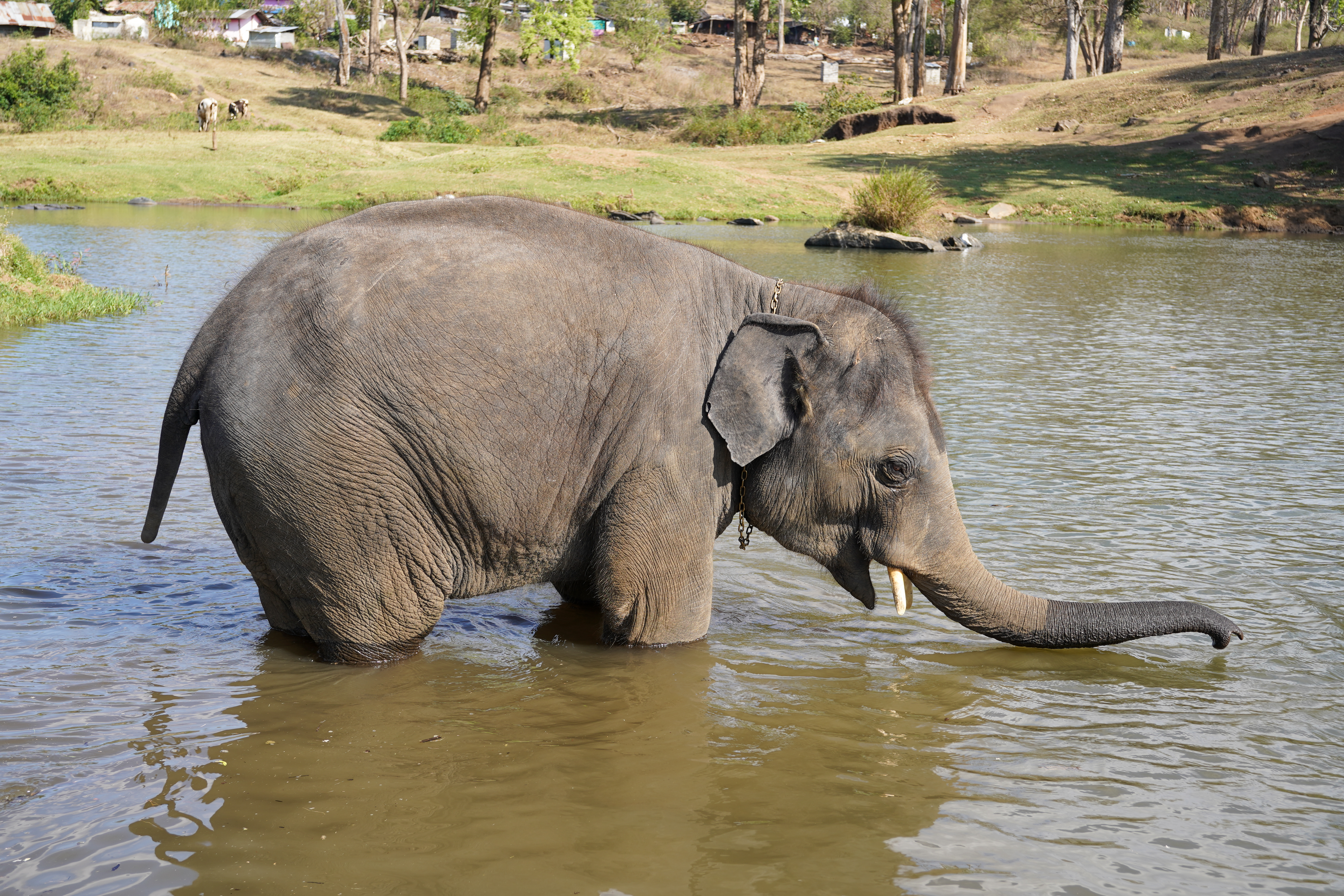
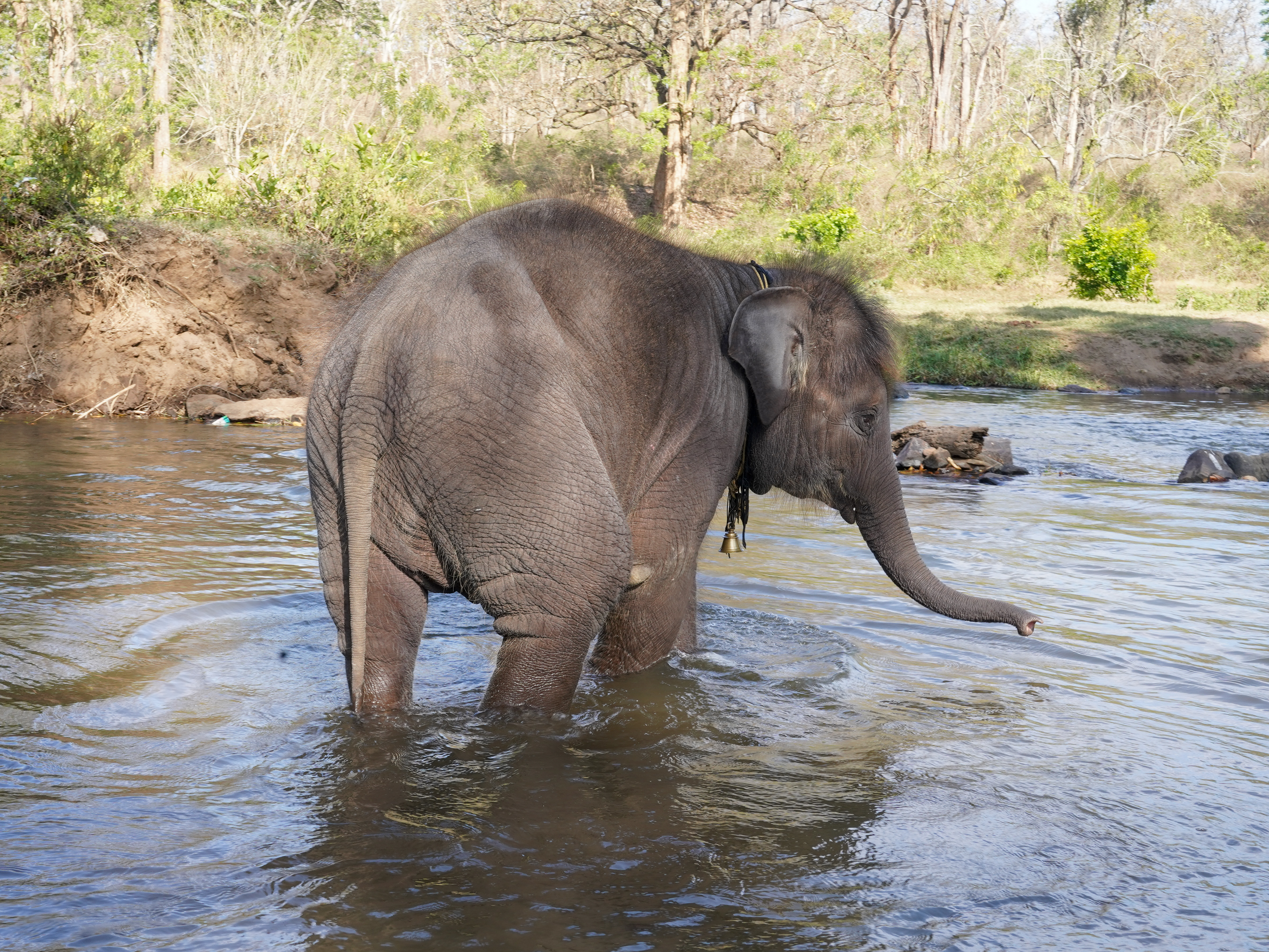
Raghu (juvenile male elephant; left) and Ammu (right), the stars of the film, at Mudumalai National Park, Tamil Nadu, India

Set in the Mudumalai National Park in the border of Karnataka and Tamil Nadu states of India, The Elephant Whisperers tells the story of Bomman and Bellie, an indigenous couple belonging to the Kattunayakan tribe who are entrusted with an orphaned baby Indian elephant named Raghu. They invest much effort to ensure that the fragile, injured infant survives and grows to be a healthy juvenile. A strong bond develops between the couple and the elephant. They adopt another elephant, Ammu, and eventually have to give up Raghu.

== Production and release ==
Director Kartiki Gonsalves encountered Raghu when he was three months old, and spent approximately a year and a half with him before shooting documentary. The documentary crew lived amongst the caregivers and their baby elephant, for almost five years, filming the daily life and events of Bomman and Bellie and their adopted elephants. The documentary focuses on the scientific aspects of elephant rescue and rehabilitation while emphasising the traditional practices of calf rearing. Wildlife Biologist Dr. Sreedhar Vijayakrishnan, who has been studying elephant behaviour in the wild and in captivity, served as the scientific advisor.

The film had its world premiere on 9 November 2022 at Doc NYC Film Festival, a film festival for documentaries in the United States. It was released globally for streaming by Netflix on 8 December 2022. It won the Academy Award for Best Documentary Short Film at the 95th Academy Awards, making it the first Indian film to win an Academy Award in that category, surpassing other nominees such as Stranger at the Gate and How Do You Measure a Year?.

== Reception ==
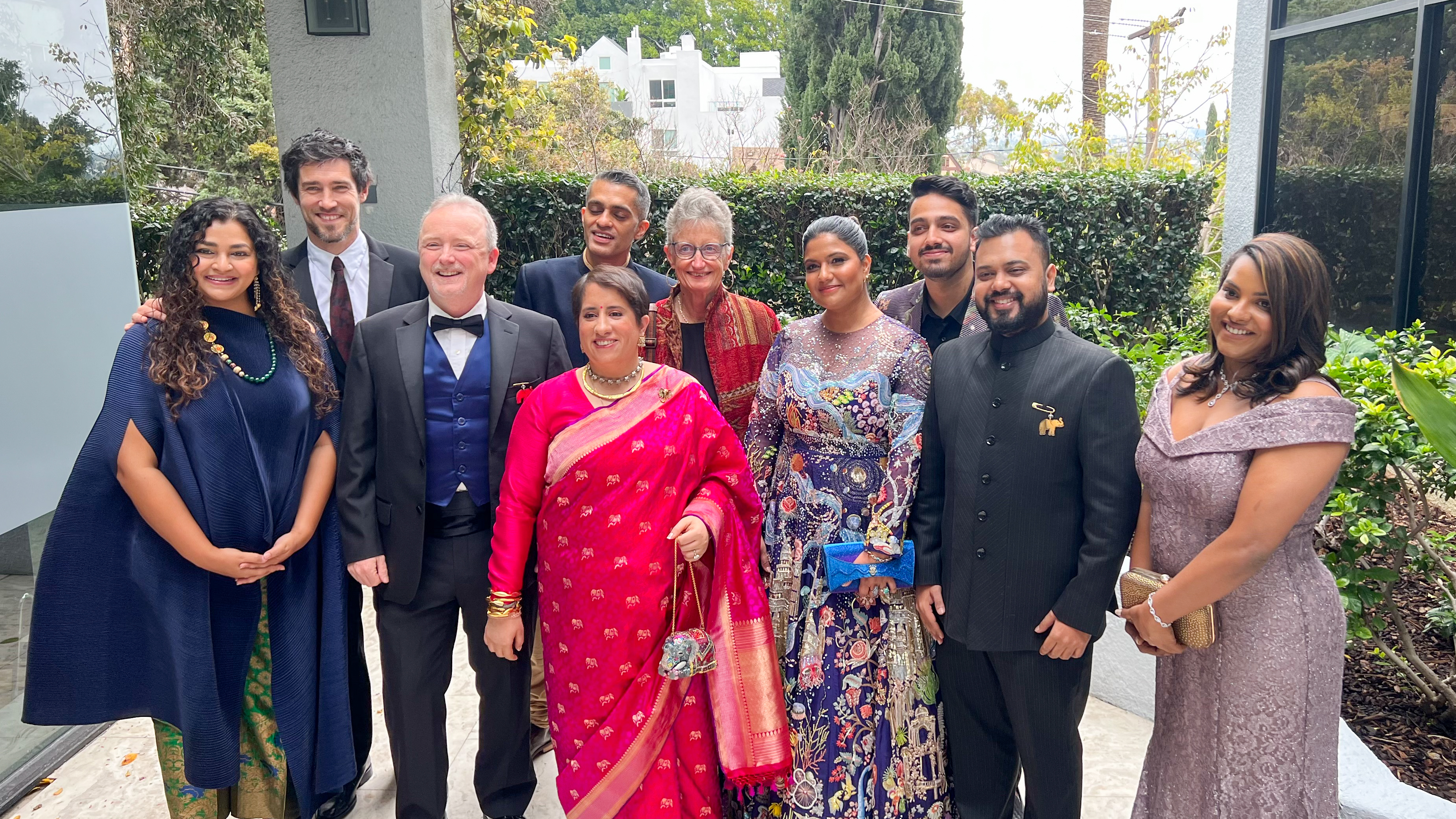
The Elephant Whisperers team at the 95th Academy Awards

On the review aggregator Rotten Tomatoes website, the film has an approval rating of 100% based on 5 reviews, with an average rating of 7.7/10.

Romey Norton of Ready Steady Cut rated the film 3.5 out of 5 and said that "It packs a small punch and is definitely worth the watch, especially if you love elephants." Poulomi Das, reviewing for Firstpost, wrote that the "narrative is fairly straightforward, [and] the storytelling manages to be simultaneously gentle and persuasive, [..] elevated by its stunning cinematography." Das opined that "much of the beauty of the film lies in the understated coming-of-age of the film’s narrative that draws ample parallels between humans and animals." Additionally, he interpreted the documentary as a "love-story about the power of community" and "the dignity of — all kinds of — life". Manjeet Singh of Leisure Byte praised its writing for ability to form "an experience that needs to be felt, than rather just to be seen", as well as capacity for crying and "the finest presentation of the year". Outlook India wrote that the film is not just a heart-touching story of a bond between animal and human and co-existence, but also a showcase of Indian culture and tradition of environment conservation.

=== Aftermath ===
In an interview with The Hindu, the tribal couple Bomman and Bellie said they were exploited by the filmmakers who did not remunerate them or deliver on the promises made, and that the director, who was amiable during the shoot, became distant after the movie won fame. All of these claims have been denied by the filmmakers. Bomman subsequently backtracked on his complaint in a video reported by India Today. He stated that he did not know who sent the legal notice, nor did he know the advocate or have any evidence.

== Accolades ==
Award	Date of ceremony	Category	Recipient(s)	Result	Ref.
Academy Awards	12 March 2023	Best Documentary Short Film	Kartiki Gonsalves, Guneet Monga	Won	
DOC NYC	9 November 2022	Shorts: Change Makers	The Elephant Whisperers	Shortlisted	
Hollywood Music in Media Awards	16 November 2022	Score – Short Film (Documentary)	Sven Faulconer	Nominated	
IDA Documentary Awards	10 December 2022	Best Short Documentary	The Elephant Whisperers	Nominated	

== See also ==
- Submissions for Best Documentary Short Academy Award
- Theppakadu Elephant Camp
- Whispers: An Elephant's Tale
