= Jenu Kuruba =

Ethnic group

Photographs of young female and males, in 1956

The Jenu Kuruba are a tribal group from the Nilgiris, numbering around 37000. They are considered a subgroup of the larger Kurumba tribal community, which also includes clans such as the Mullu Kurumbas, Betta Kurubas, Palu Kurumbas, and Shola Nayakkars. They are concentrated in the districts bordering the states of Kerala and Karnataka. 'Jenu' means 'honey' in Kannada, referring to their traditional occupation as collectors of honey in the forest. In the early 20th century they lived in huts in the forests and cultivated. Starting from the 1970s and continuing today, many of the Jenu Kurubas have been evicted from their homes due to conservation measures in the various tiger reserves of the Nilgiris, like Nagarhole and Bandipur national parks. Those who have been relocated outside the forest are daily wagers and agricultural labourers, who live in extreme poverty. Many work as labourers on coffee estates in Kodagu or for the Forest Department. They speak the Jenu Kurumba language, either classified as being related to Kodava or a rural dialect of Kannada. The tribals have fought multiple times to live in the reserved forests, most recently in 2020, under the terms of the Forest Rights Act and in 2021 protests continued against "the forest department as an encroacher, promoting eco-tourism and safaris … [in a way which] … is illegal under Indian and international laws."

Previously their women wore a sari in the style of typical Mysore rural women, and if poor, wore a cloth around the waist and another to partially cover the upper body. The men of the community cut their hair short in the style of a typical cultivator, providing some protection from heat and sun.

In May 2025, 50 Jenu Kuruba families returned to their ancestral village in Nagarhole Tiger Reserve, 40 years after they were evicted.

In June 2025, Survival International reported that 250 forest guards, tiger force members and police had raided the village, tearing down seven forest shelters where women, children and older people were staying.
