= Sholaga people =

Soliga
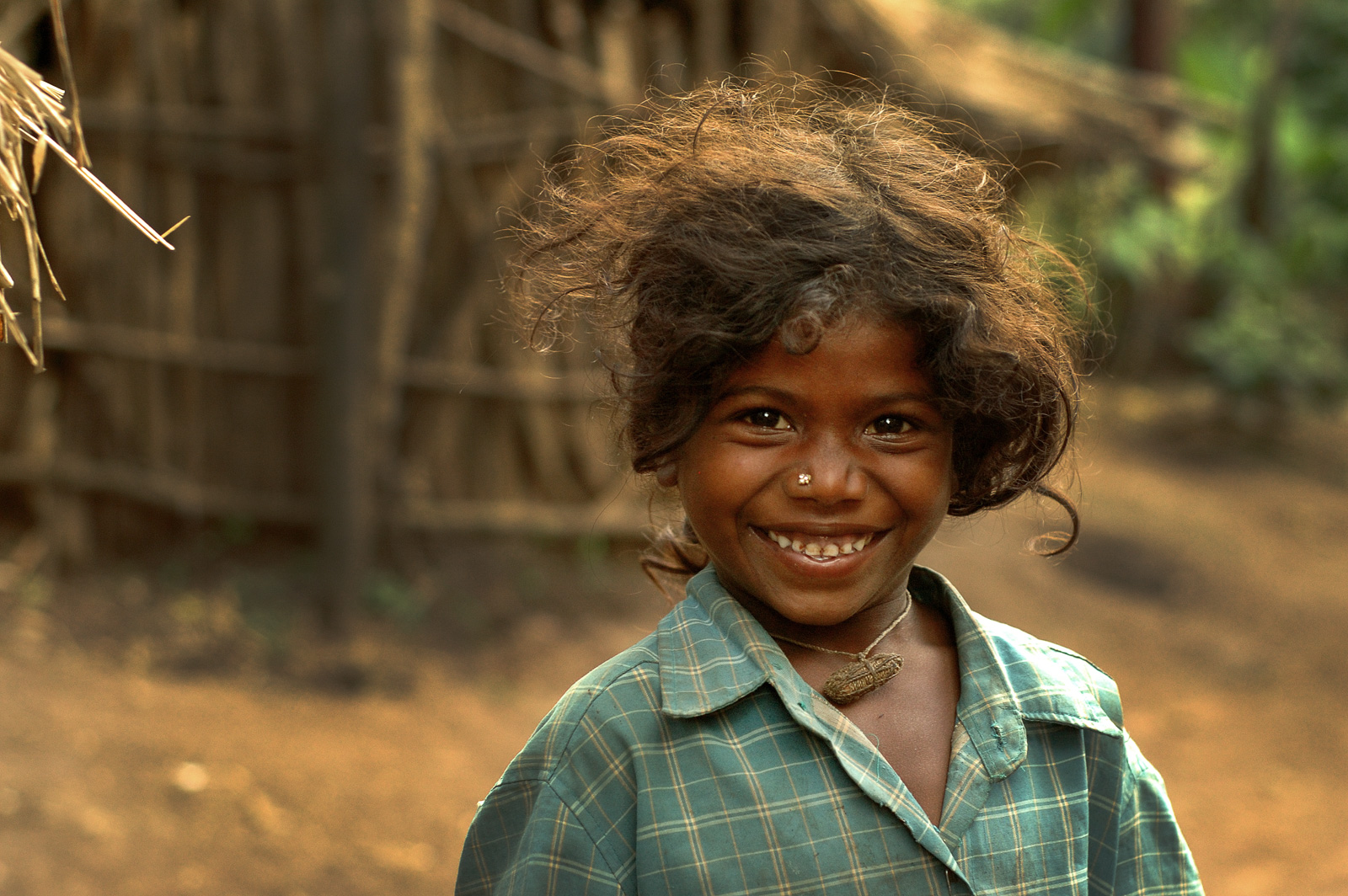
- A Soliga girl

Total population
- 40,000

Regions with significant populations
- India
- Karnataka: 33,819
- Tamil Nadu: 5,965

Languages
- First language Sholaga; Second language Kannada, Tamil,

Related ethnic groups
- Koraga, Irula, Yerukala

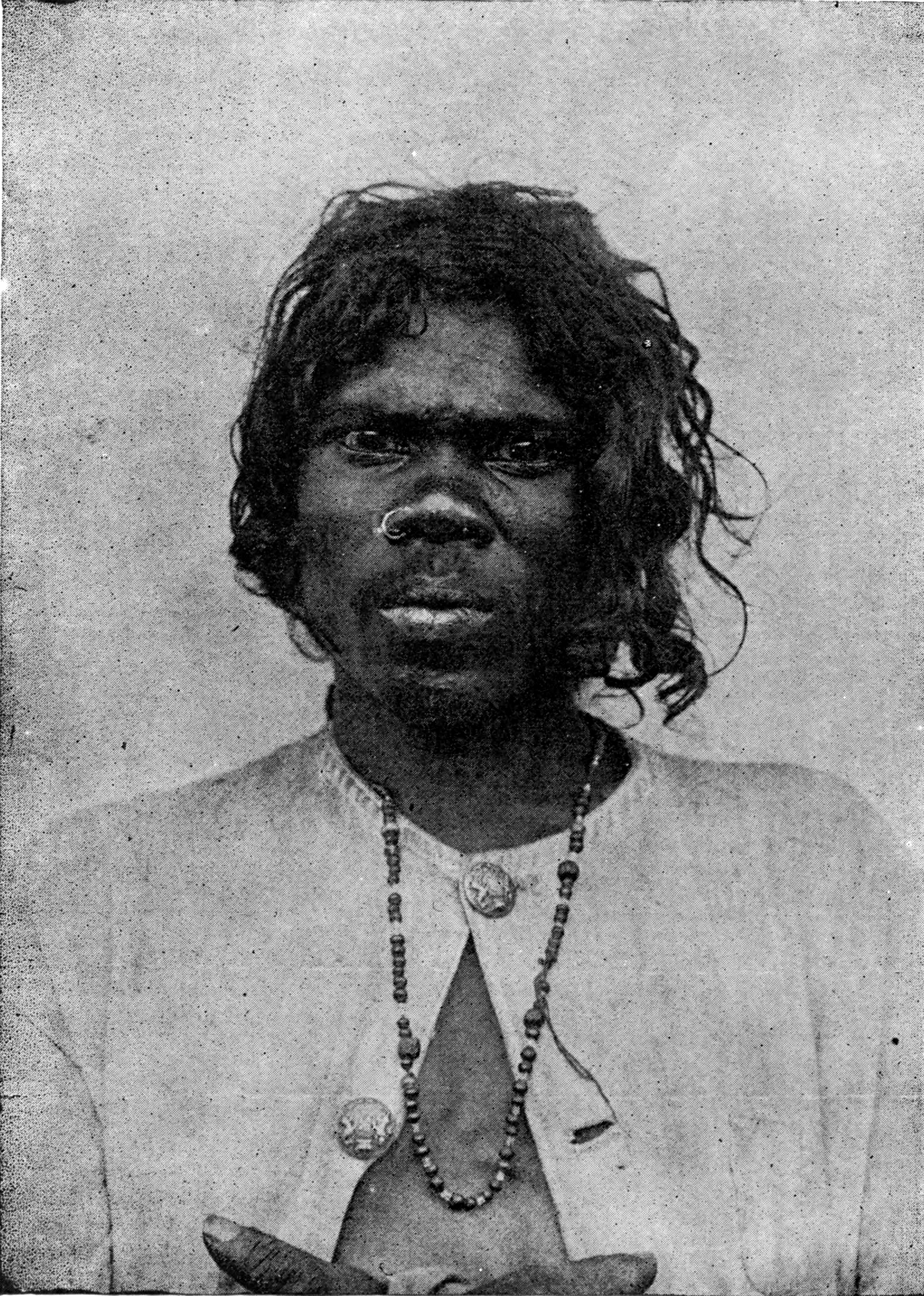
A Soliga man

Sholaga (IPA: [ʃoːlɐɡɐ, s-], also spelled S(h)olega, S(h)oliga, Soliga and S(h)ōlaga) is an ethnic group of India. Its members inhabit the mountain ranges mostly in the Chamarajanagar district of southern Karnataka and Erode district of Tamil Nadu. They are also found in Ramanagara district in smaller numbers. Many are concentrated in the Biligiriranga Hills and associated ranges, mainly in the talukas Yelandur, Kollegal and Chamarajanagar of Karnataka. The Soligas speak Sholaga, which belongs to the Dravidian family. Under Indian law, they are recognised as a scheduled tribe, they have a population of around 40,000.

== Etymology ==
The term comes from śōla "forest" and -ga "people".

== Origin ==
The Soliga tribe trace their origin to Karayya, son of the deity Maleya Mahadeshwara, swamy of Maleya Mahadeshwara Hills, Karnataka. Legend says that on seeing Karayya's affinity towards wild animals, Maleya Mahadeshwara swamy asked Karayya to reside in forests, whereas the other son Biliyayya resided in plains and became the forefather of Lingayats.

== Language ==
The Soliga speak the Sholaga language (Soliganudi) as a mother tongue. A member of the Dravidian family, it is most closely related to Kannada with several Tamil influences.

== Groups ==
There are five sub groups of Soligas:

- Male Soliga: Kannada speakers residing in Karnataka
- Urali Soliga: Kannada and Tamil speakers, residing in border areas of Tamil Nadu
- Pujari group: reside in Maleya Mahadeshwara Hills
- Kadu Soliga: reside near Bandipur Forest
- Burude Soliga: reside in Heggadadevanakote Taluk and Kodagu

Furthermore, these groups have several sub-groups.

== Occupation and social status ==
The Soliga used to practice shifting cultivation, but have more or less given up this practice now. They grow Rāgi (Finger millet, Eleusine coracana) for subsistence. Their main source of income is harvesting and sale of Non-timber Forest Produce (NTFP) like honey, nellikai (gooseberry, Emblica officinalis), bamboo, Paasi (Lichen), algae, wild turmeric, Indian blackberry, soapnut and nennari (wild root). They also make baskets using bamboo.

They are increasingly being brought to the "mainstream" with active Government and NGO initiative. Many have been given lands closer to 'civilised areas' and most of the forest-dwelling population have been brought together into clusters called Podus. Most of the forest area they stay comes under wild life protection area. The Biligiriranga Hills is a Wildlife Sanctuary under Wildlife Protection Act, 1972, the Male Mahadeswara Hills is a Reserve Forest, and Bandipur is a National Park. Their rights on harvesting NTFP is being sought to be withdrawn citing conservation concerns, sparking a debate about the rights of indigenous people. The Soligas later won a court case to stay on their land.

== Religion ==
Soliga people follow naturism and animism along with following Hindu practices and their main deities are Madeshwara, Rangaswamy of Biligirirangana Hills (who is considered the brother-in-law of the clan), Karayya, Kyate Devaru and Jadeswamy. her deities worshipped by them include Madeshwara, Basaveshwara and Nanjundeshwara and Sri Alamelu Ranganayaki smetha Sri hanuma.

== See also ==
- Koraga
