= Kannadoid languages =

Dravidian languages spoken in South India

Kannadoid
- Kannada–Badaga
- Geographic distribution: South India
- Linguistic classification: Dravidian: Southern; Southern I; Tamil–Kannada; Kannadoid
- Subdivisions: Kannada; Holiya; Badaga; Sholaga; Alu Kurumba; Betta Kurumba; Jenu Kurumba; Maundadan Chetti

Language codes
- Glottolog: bada1263
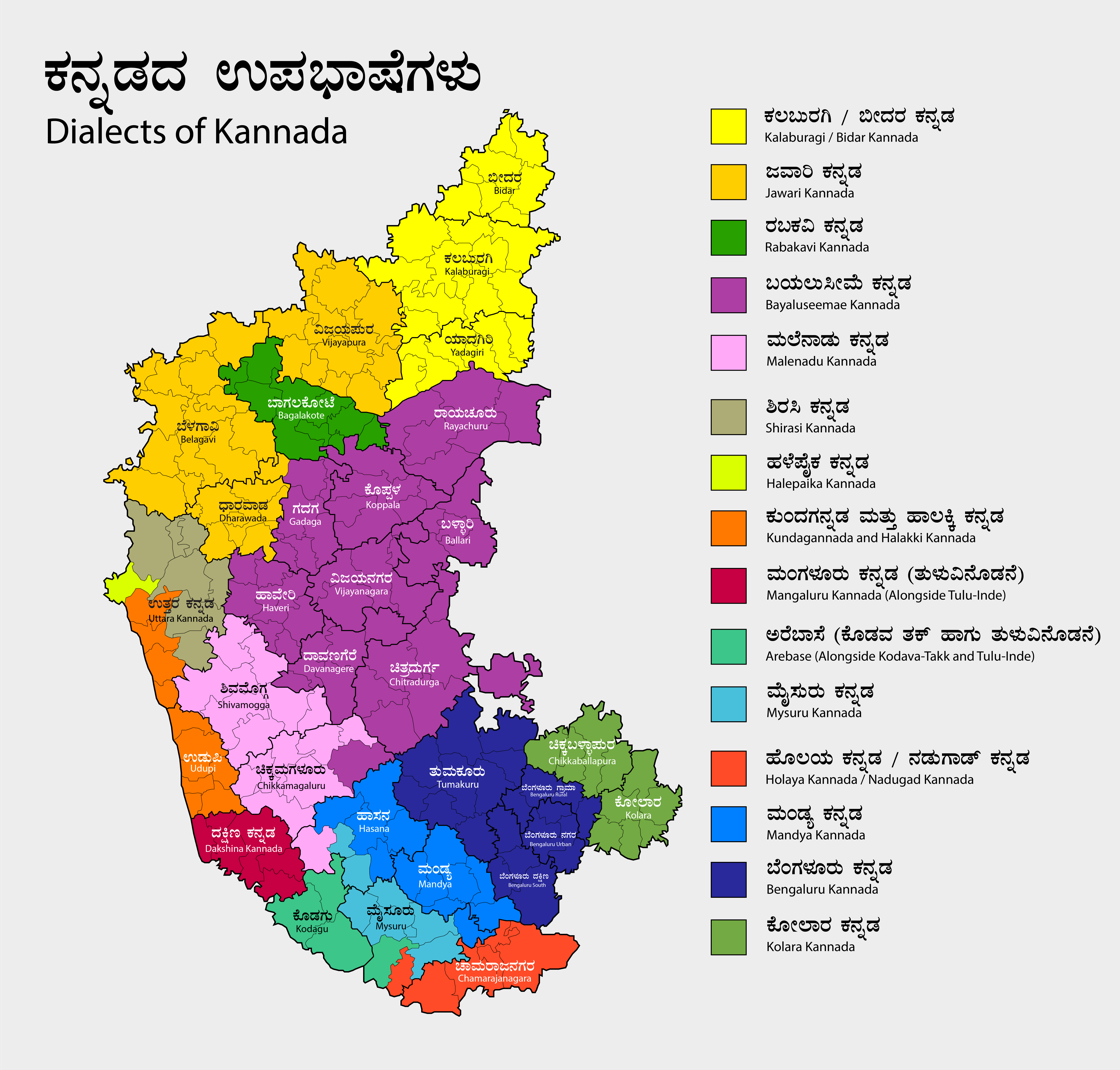
- Map of Kannada dialects in the state of Karnataka.

Kannadoid languages, in the broad sense incorporating the Kannada–Badaga languages, are spoken in and around Karnataka. Apart from literary Kannada, used in television, news and literature, there are many spoken dialects.

== Kannadoid languages ==
Badaga is a Kannada-related language spoken by the Badaga community in the Nilgiri region in Tamil Nadu.

Betta Kurumba, Holiya and Sholaga are also close to Kannada.

== Kannada Dialects ==
Dialects of Kannada language fall into four groups:

Coastal
- Mangaluru
- Halakki Achchagannada
- Barkur
- Havyaka
- Kundagannada
- Sirsi Kannada
- Malenadu
- Nador Kannada

Northern
- Vijayapura
- Kalaburagi
- Dharwad

South-Western
- Arebhashe
- Tiptur
- Rabakavi
- Nanjangudu Kannada

Southern
- Aruvu
- Bengaluru Kannada
- Chamarajanagar
- Mandya
- Banakal Kannada

== See also ==
- Dialect or language
- South Dravidian I
- Kannada
