= Sholaga language =

Kannadoid language of India

Sholaga
- Soliga
- Native to: India
- Region: Karnataka, Tamil Nadu
- Ethnicity: Soliga
- Native speakers: 24,000 (2006)
- Language family: Dravidian: Southern; Southern I; Tamil–Kannada; Badaga–Kannada; Kannadoid; Sholaga

Language codes
- ISO 639-3: sle
- Glottolog: shol1240
- ELP: Sholaga

The Sholaga language (IPA: [ʃoːlɐɡɐ, s-]) is a Dravidian language that is related to Kannada and Tamil and is spoken by the Soliga people. The language is also known as Kadu Sholigar, Sholiga, Sholigar, Solaga, Solega, Soliga, Soligar, Solanayakkans, Sholanayika.

== Etymology ==
The language's name comes from śōla "forest" and -ga "people".

== Classification ==
Sholaga is classified as a Dravidian language. The Dravidian languages are split into five main categories, called Southern, South Central, Central, North and Unclassified. Sholaga falls into the Southern category, which has three subcategories: Tamil-Kannada, Macro-Tulu, and unclassified. Sholaga is a Tamil-Kannada language.

== Phonology ==
Here are the vowel and the consonant phonemes of Sholaga:

=== Vowels ===
	Front		Central				Back	
	short	long	short	long	short	long	short	long
High	i	iː	ɨ	ɨː	ʉ	ʉː	u	uː
Mid	e	eː	ə	əː	ɵ	ɵː	o	oː
Low			a	aː				

Kamil Zvelebil listed centralized <ä, ǟ> in the phonology. The real quality distinguishing <ä, ǟ> and <a, ā> is unclear.

- There are phonemic nasal vowels. All plain vowels have nasal counterparts, mostly from old final nasals: akkã "sister", mö̃yi "body".

=== Consonants ===
Consonants
		Labial	Dental/ Alveolar	Retroflex	Palatal/ Pst.alv	Velar	Glottal
Nasal		m	n̪	ɳ		ŋ	
Plosive/ Affricate	voiceless	p	t̪	ʈ	t͡ʃ	k	
Plosive/ Affricate	voiced	b	d̪	ɖ	d͡ʒ	ɡ	
Fricative			s				h
Approximant		ʋ	l	ɭ	j		
Rhotic			ɾ⠀r	ɽ			

- /s/ is in free variation with [ʃ] and does not clash with /t͡ʃ, d͡ʒ/.
- p- > h- > ∅-: Sholaga aga, Kannada hoge; Sholaga haḍagu, Kannada haḍagu. Initial p-. also exists like in paḍḍe.
- /ɖ, ɽ/ contrast: nōṛ- "see", ōḍ- "run".
- /k/ palatalization does not occur like in Kannada: Sholaga kimi, Kannada kivi, Tamil cevi.
- Rare /g/ > /ŋ/: Sholaga maṅa, Kannada maganu.

== Grammar ==
- The formative morpheme *-ay is -a: Tamil iṯappay "eyelid", Kannada rappe, Sholaga ṟappa.
- Like Irula and nearby Nilagiri languages, it lacks the oblique form in compounds with a modifier followed by the modified: kāḍu aṉḏi "forest pig", Tamil kāṭṭu (< kāṭu) paṉṟi.
- Unlike Jenu Kuruba, it has a rich use of plural forms. Most take -ga, but most nouns that end with -ã take -diru, but others take -ru.
- Most cases are like in Kannada, but the forms are not identical.
- There are only two tense stems: past/non-past (which is more like verb finished vs unfinished). From the past tense, the preterite tense is frmed, and from the non-past tense, the present-future tense is formed.

== Words ==
English	Sholaga
tiger	dodinayi
elephant	coquedana
elephant with huge tusks	coquedonga
female elephant with growing tusks	coreyani
deer	Maan
Sambar deer	kadave
Chital	saraga
Moss Deer	koore
muntjac	tadu-koori
Area with boulders and rarely any rain	udugaru
An evergreen forest	Patchai kadu

== Sources ==
- Zvelebil, Kamil V. (1990). "The Language of the Shōlegas, Nilgiri Area, South India". Journal of the American Oriental Society. 110 (3): 417–433. doi:10.2307/603185. JSTOR 603185.
