= Jakkamma =

Caste deity of Rajakambalam Nayakar peoples

Jakkamma is the caste deity of Rajakambalam Nayakar peoples. It is the family deity of all the 9 subcastes of Kambalatars. In Panchalankurichi, a temple for Jakkamma had been built by Veerapandiya Kattabomman family. Jakkamma also called in some places as Bommamma.
