= Betta Kurumba language =

Dravidian language of India

Betta Kurumba
- ಬೆಟ್ಟ ಕುರುಬ; பெட்ட குறும்பர்
- Native to: India
- Region: Nilgiri mountains (Tamil Nadu, Karnataka, Kerala)
- Native speakers: 32,000 (2003)
- Language family: Dravidian: Southern; Southern I; Tamil–Kannada; Badaga–Kannada; Kannadoid; Betta Kurumba
- Writing system: Kannada script Malayalam script Tamil script

Language codes
- ISO 639-3: xub
- Glottolog: bett1235
- ELP: Betta Kurumba

The Betta Kurumba language (Beṭṭa Kurumba, IPA: [beʈːɐ kurumbɐ]) is a Dravidian language closely related to Kannada and Tamil, and is spoken by 32,000 people in the Nilgiri mountains and in adjoining areas in Tamil Nadu, Karnataka and Kerala. Beṭṭa (ಬೆಟ್ಟ) means “hills” in Kannada and kurumba (ಕುರುಬ) means “shepherd”.

== See also ==
- Kuruba
- Kurumba languages
- Dravidian languages
- List of languages by number of native speakers in India
- Languages of South Asia
