= Peak Design =

Camera accessories manufacturer

- Industry: Consumer goods
- Founded: 2010; 16 years ago
- Founder: Peter Dering
- Headquarters: San Francisco, California, US
- Number of locations: 4
- Products: Backpacks, Capture camera clip, camera accessories
- Website: peakdesign.com

Peak Design is an American design and manufacturing company that manufactures travel gear, camera accessories, and lifestyle products. It was founded in 2010 by Peter Dering and started with a Kickstarter campaign for its Capture clip device. Peak Design is headquartered in San Francisco, California.

== History ==
Peak Design was founded in 2010 by Peter Dering. Its first product, the Capture Camera Clip, was launched on Kickstarter in 2011, raising over $360,000. Since then, Peak Design has launched multiple products through crowdfunding platforms, including the Everyday Backpack and Travel Tripod. The company is notable for continued use of Kickstarter (its 14th campaign launched in March 2025) for launching new products, rather than pursuing traditional venture capital funding.

Peak design received its B-Corp certification in 2019.

== Products ==
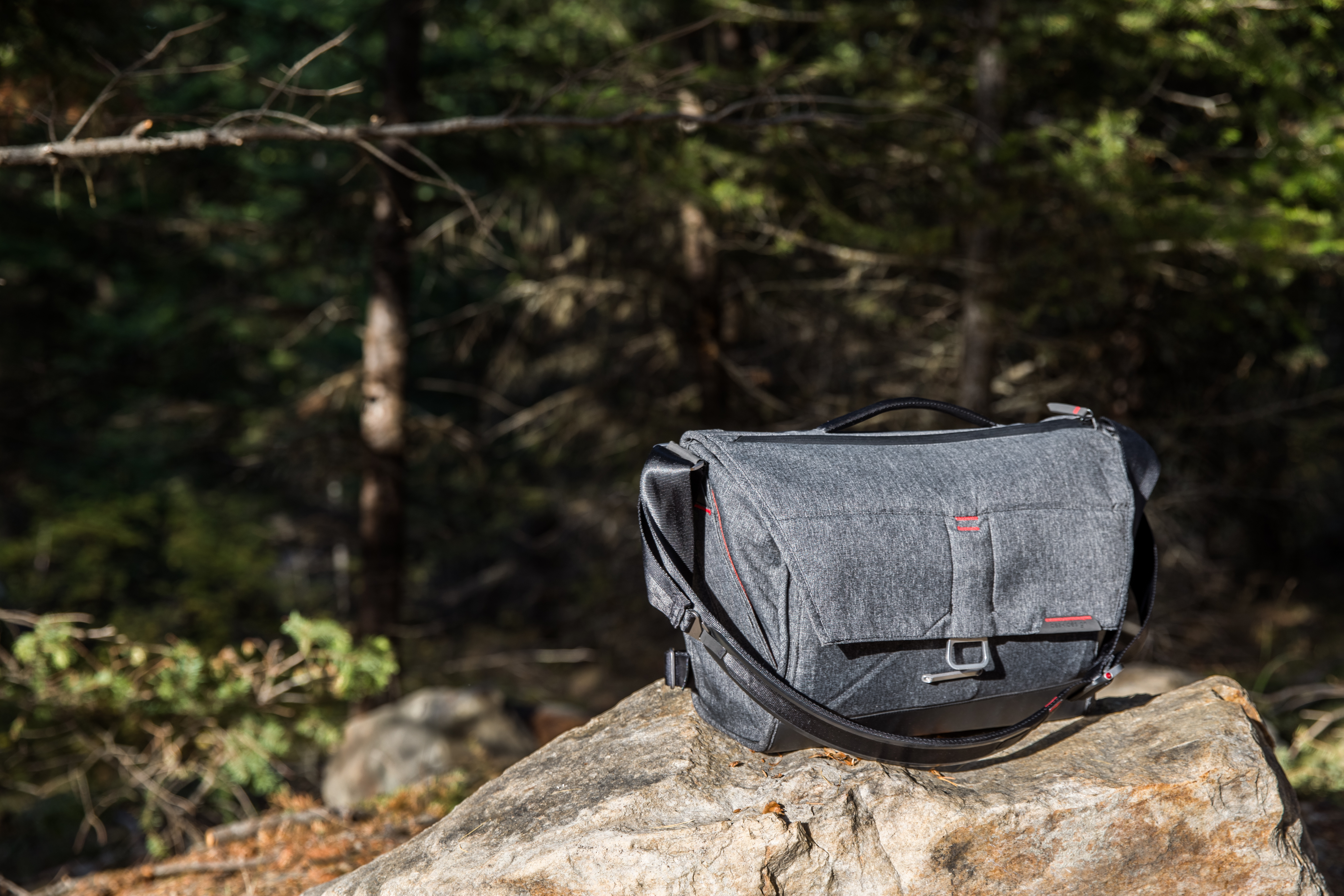
An example of a Peak Design bag

Peak Design offers a range of products designed for photographers, travelers, and everyday users. Its key product categories include camera accessories, travel bags, tripods, and mobile accessories.

Kickstarter campaigns
KS #	Campaign Name	Launch Date	Backers	Total USD
1	Capture Camera Clip System	May 2, 2011	5,258	$364,698
2	Leash and Cuff	November 22, 2012	3,108	$215,721
3	Capture Camera Clip v2	June 29, 2013	8,090	$819,108
4	Slide Camera Sling and Clutch Hand Strap	June 16, 2014	9,455	$861,164
5	The Everyday Messenger: A Bag For Cameras & Essential Carry	July 22, 2015	17,029	$4,869,472
6	The Everyday Backpack, Tote, and Sling	July 12, 2016	26,359	$6,565,782
7	Camera Carry, Reimagined: Capture v3, Slide, and Slide Lite	November 6, 2017	12,196	$1,330,583
8	The Travel Line: Versatile Travel Backpack + Packing Tools	July 23, 2018	13,752	$5,206,611
9	Travel Tripod	May 21, 2019	27,168	$12,143,435
10	Mobile: A phone case that does more, with zero bulk.	October 19, 2020	14,169	$2,000,497
11	Micro Clutch: Never drop your mirrorless camera again	May 16, 2023	11,310	$1,492,392
12	Motorcycle Phone Mounts with Ripping Fast Qi2 Charging	July 9, 2024	1,509	$273,024
13	The Outdoor Line	September 3, 2024	10,170	$3,438,028
14	Roller Pro Carry-On Luggage	March 4, 2025	24,219	$13,408,553
15	Pro Tripod	June 17, 2025		

== Sustainability ==
Peak Design emphasizes environmental sustainability in its operations. The company became carbon neutral in 2018. Many of its products are made using recycled materials, and its lifetime warranty policy promotes product longevity.

In 2020, Peak Design co-founded the Climate Neutral Certified label, encouraging companies to measure, reduce, and offset carbon emissions. This initiative has grown to include hundreds of companies globally.

== Recognition ==
The company has received multiple design awards, including the Red Dot Design Award, iF Design Award, and ISPO Award, for its products.

== Controversies ==
In 2021 Peak Design accused Amazon for creating a copycat version of their Everyday Sling bag called, "Amazon Basics Everyday Sling". Amazon later changed the name of the bag.

After the killing of Brian Thompson, Peak Design CEO Peter Dering reported to police that the suspect was carrying a Peak Design backpack. Dering and Peak Design received death threats after this reporting. According to Dering, no private customer information was provided to the police.
