= Badagas =

Ethno-linguistic group in Tamil Nadu, India

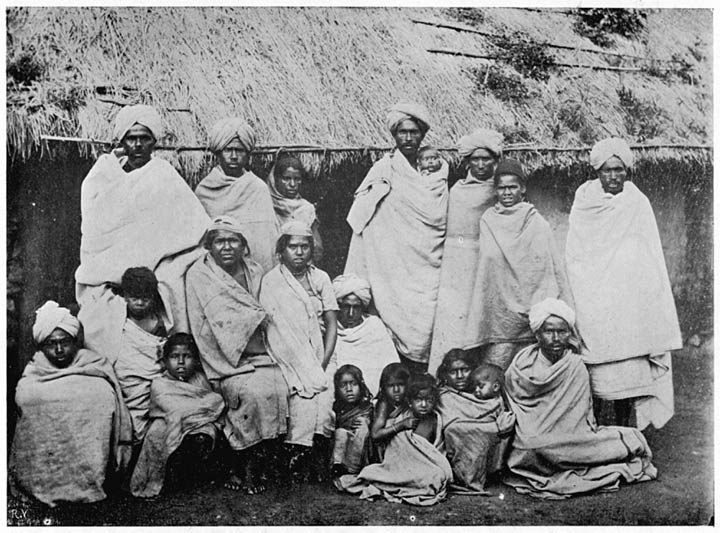
- Badaga family in the Nilgiri Hills, 1909

Languages
- Badaga

Religion
- Hinduism

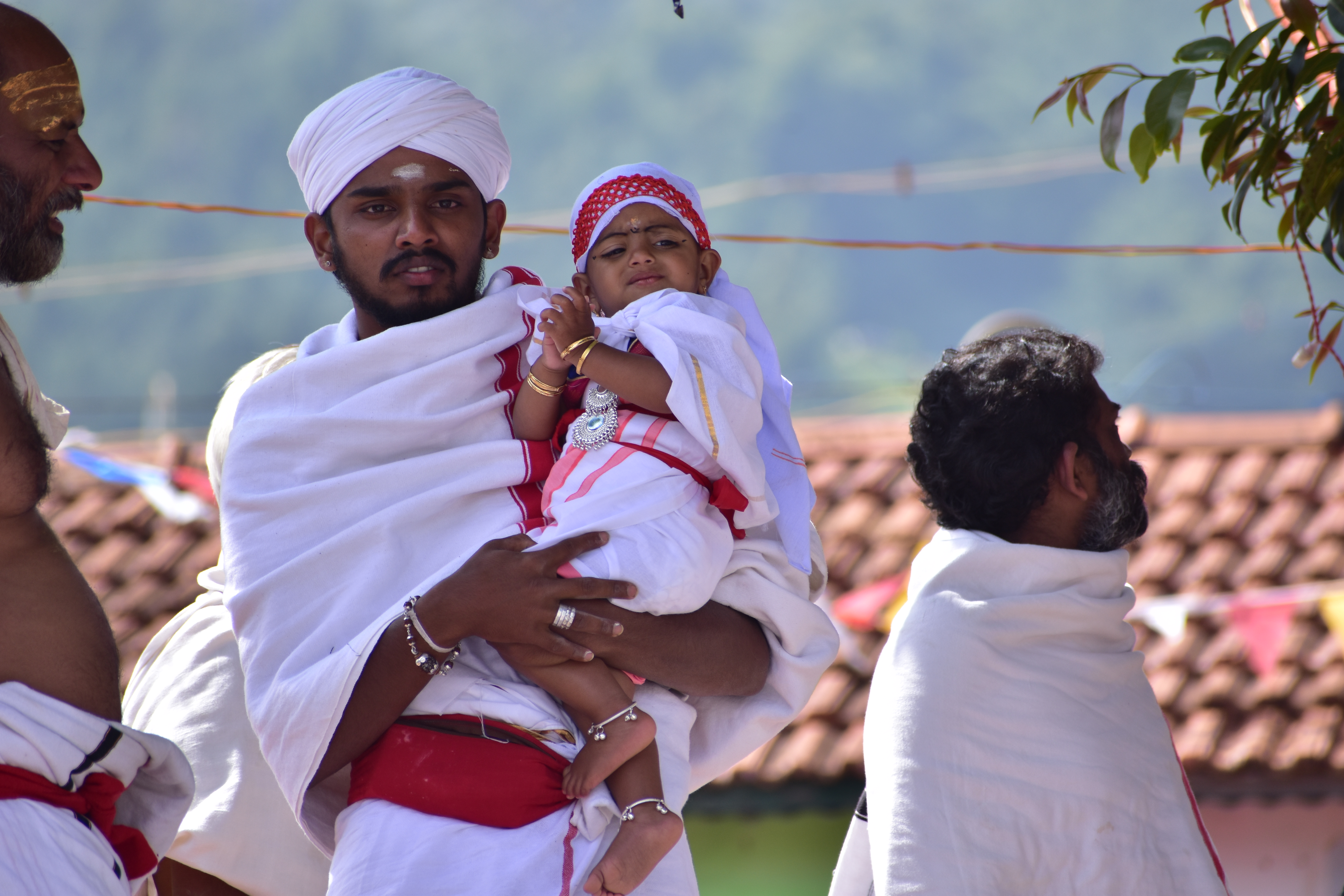
Badagas celebrating the festival of Hetha Habba.

The Badagas are an ethno-linguistic community living in the Nilgiris district in Tamil Nadu, India. Throughout the district the Badugas live in nearly 400 villages, called Hattis. The Badagas speak a language called Badaga.

== History ==
The name Badaga, meaning 'northerner', comes from Old Kannada Badagana, meaning 'north.' According to the Badaga oral tradition, their ancestors were presumed to be Vokkaligas who migrated from the plains of Mysore to avoid Muslim persecution. According to American anthropologist Paul Hockings, whose research on the Badagas spans nearly six decades, "the (Badaga) tribe despite its sketchy history is as indigenous to the Nilgiris as the English are to Britain."

They claim to come from seven siblings living in the Thalaimalai Hills. After they fled from a Muslim ruler who tried to rape their sister, they settled in different parts of the Nilgiris. The second brother, Hethappa, was working outside when two Todas raped his wife and took his goods. He sought the aid of two Bayaluru, who agreed to help him if he married his two daughters with them. They killed the Todas, and the inhabitants of the village at the time claimed descent from the Bayalurus and Badaga's daughters.

== Culture ==
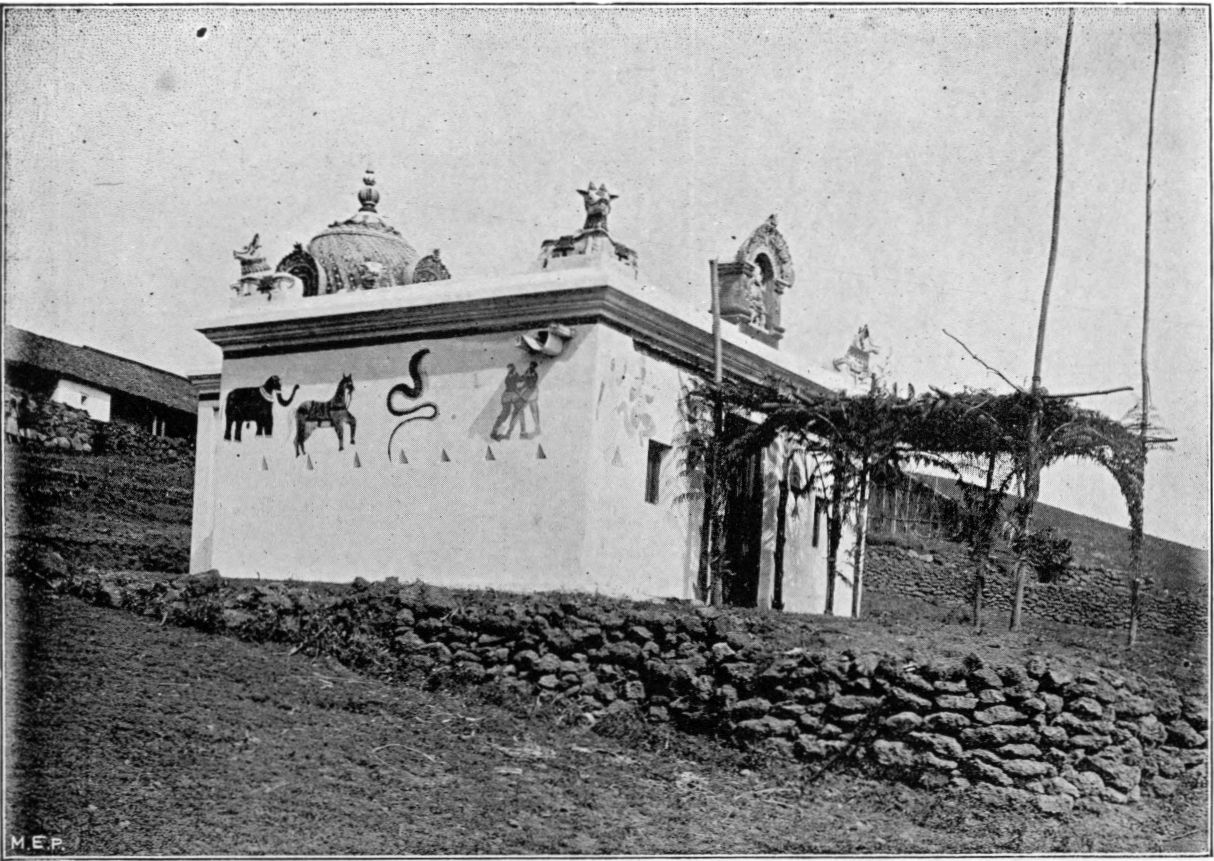
Badaga temple

Throughout the district the Badagas live in nearly 400 villages, called Hattis.

Thundu (a white piece of cloth) and Seeley forms an integral part of the attire of the Badugu women.

Badugas marry within their community and follow their own marriage traditions. Their important festival is Devva Habba. Devva Habba provides significant insights into the origin of Badugas. They have certain rules and regulations to be followed in implementing their cultural rituals from the birth of a child and follows through functions like puberty, marriage, naming ceremony, seventh-month pregnancy, housewarming, and finally in death.

They worship their seven founding ancestors under the name Hethappa or Hetha.

During time of early 1900s they were known to swear very solemn oaths by the Sri Mariamman temple. For this they bathed, brought coconut and fruit, and killed an animal. The head they put on the step of the shrine, and from seven feet off they would walk to the temple step and put out the light that was shining in front of the idol. Even the Britisher judges, in court, would also abide by this practice and occasionally send witnesses to do this ritual along with a Court official to ensure they were telling the truth. Even today they place great reverence in Sri Mariamman: in April they celebrate a car festival at the Sri Mariamman temple in Ooty when they pull the car with the image of Sri Mariamman to their music and dance.

== Language ==
The Badaga language is spoken by the Badaga community. The language is closely related to Kannada. LACITO in Paris houses numerous varieties of Badaga stories and songs collected over the past two decades.

== Education ==
Several Badaga have become officials in various parts of the Indian Government. Former Lok Sabha MP, the late Akkamma Devi, was the first Badaga woman to graduate from college and represented the Nilgiris Lok Sabha constituency from 1962 to 1967. Belli Lakshmi Ramakrishnan M.A. was the first Badaga woman post graduate in social work, and went on to be the first woman gazetted officer to serve in the Tamil Nadu State Government Department of Health and Family Welfare.

== Scheduled Tribe Status ==
There is a long-standing demand to restore the status of the Badagas in the list of Scheduled Tribes under the Indian Constitution. The Badagas were on the tribes list during the British Raj, as per the 1931 census. After Independence, Badagas were on the Scheduled Tribe list during the 1951 census, but were later removed.

== See also ==
- Koderi
