= Badaga language =

Dravidian language spoken in Southern India

Badaga
- படக, ಬಡಗ, ബഡഗ
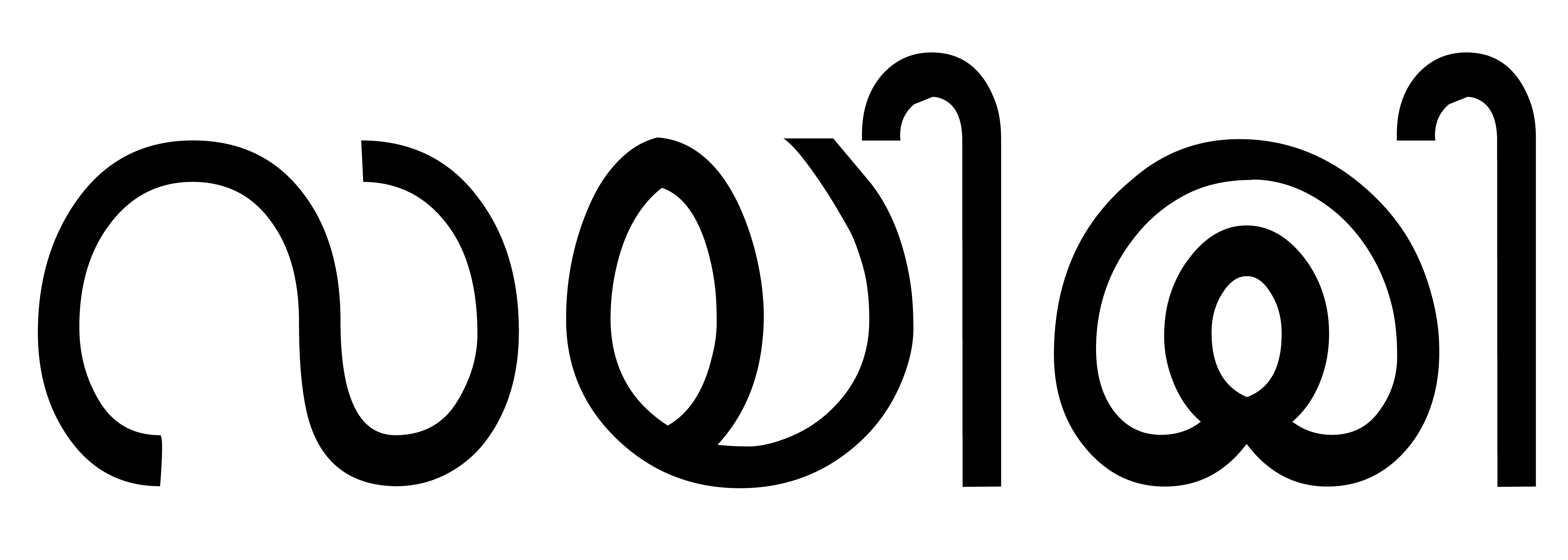
- The word "Badugu" written in Badagu script
- Native to: India
- Region: Tamil Nadu (The Nilgiris)
- Ethnicity: Badaga
- Native speakers: 134,000 (2011 census)
- Language family: Dravidian: Southern; Southern I; Tamil–Kannada; Kannada–Badaga; Badaga
- Writing system: Tamil; Badaga; Kannada

Language codes
- ISO 639-3: bfq
- Glottolog: bada1257

Badaga (IPA: [bɐɖɐɡɐ]) is a southern Dravidian language spoken by the Badaga people of the Nilgiris district of Tamil Nadu. The language is closely related to the Kannada language with influence from the Tamil language. Of all the tribal languages spoken in Nilgiris (Badaga, Toda language, Kota language, Irula language), Badaga is the most spoken language.

== Origins ==
Badaga, like modern Kannada, likely originates from Old Kannada. This is suggested by the fact that Badaga shares many common features with modern Kannada. One such feature shared by both Badaga and Kannada is initial /h/ where other Dravidian languages, and Old Kannada, have an initial /p/, a process which began around the 13th century.

== Phonology ==
Badaga has five vowel qualities, /i e a o u/, where each of them may be long or short, and until the 1930s they were contrastively half and fully retroflexed, for a total of 30 vowel phonemes. (Note: Emenau (1931) reports no tokens of /i˞˞/, but suggests this is an accidental gap.) Current speakers only distinguish retroflection of a few vowels.

Example words
IPA	Gloss
/noː/	disease
/po˞˞ː/	scar
/mo˞e˞/	sprout
/a˞e˞/	tiger's den
/ha˞ːsu/	to spread out
/ka˞˞ːʃu/	to remove
/i˞ːu˞˞/	seven
/hu˞˞ːj/	tamarind
/be˞ː/	bangle
/be˞˞ː/	banana
/huj/	to strike
/u˞˞j/	chisel

Note on transcription: rhoticity ⟨◌˞⟩ indicates half-retroflexion; doubled ⟨◌˞˞⟩ it indicates full retroflexion.

		Bilabial	Alveolar	Retroflex	Palatal	Velar	Glottal
Nasal		m	n	ɳ	ɲ	ŋ	
Stop	Voiceless	p	t	ʈ	c	k	
Stop	Voiced	b	d	ɖ	ɟ	ɡ	
Fricative			s				h
Approximant		ʋ	l	ɻ	j		
Trill			r				

== Writing system ==
Badaga is presently written in the Kannada and Tamil scripts, but they pose difficulties in accurately representing the sounds of Badaga. Several attempts have been made at constructing an orthography based on English, Kannada and Tamil. Among these, the Badagu script developed by Yogesh Raj has seen the most acceptance within the community.

=== Badagu script ===
Badagu script Badagu Barego
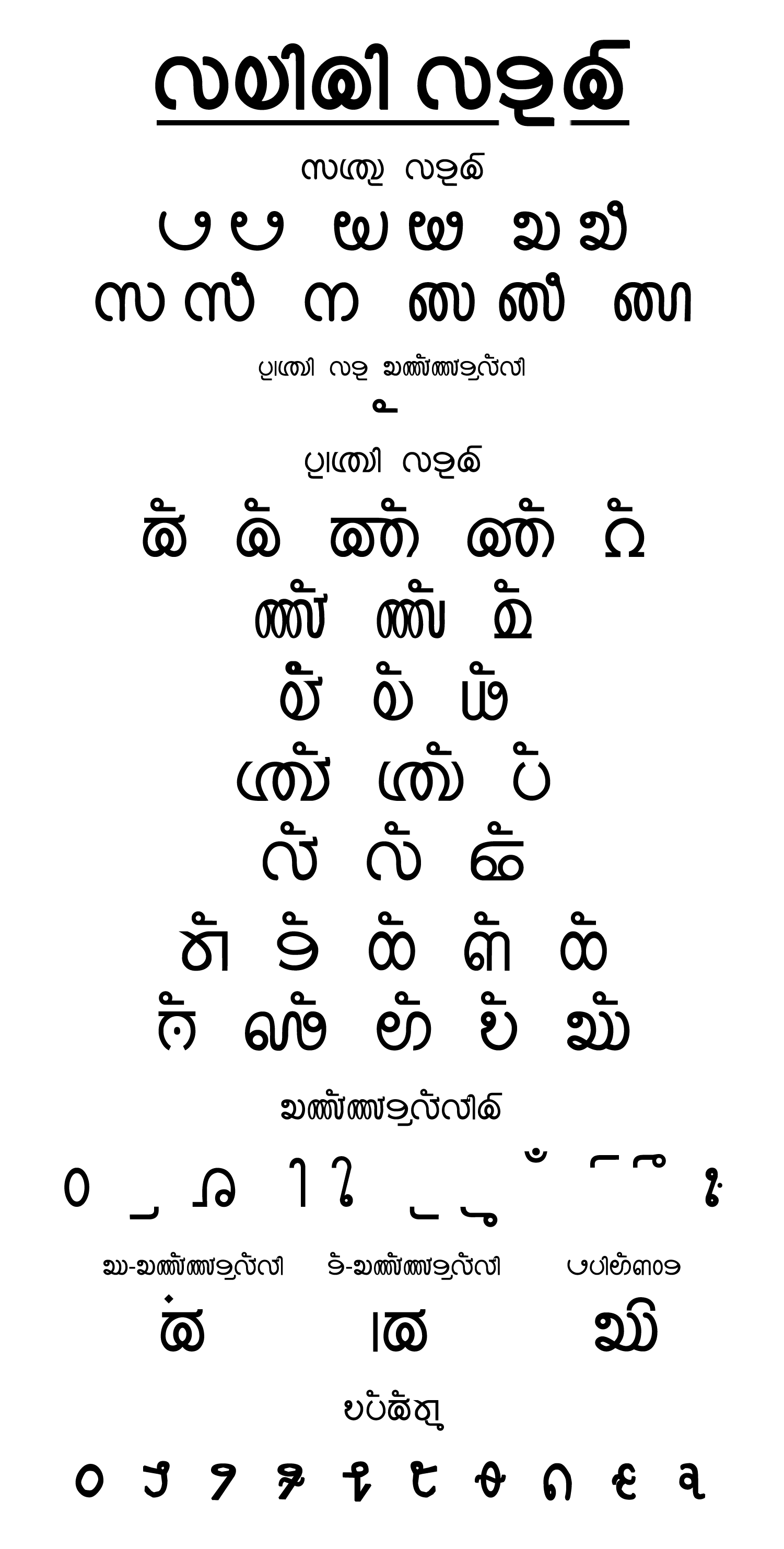
- Badaga Barego (Alphabet Chart)
- Script type: Abugida
- Creator: Yogesh Raj Kadasoley
- Created: 1968
- Period: 1968–present
- Direction: Left-to-right
- Languages: Badaga

Related scripts
- Parent systems: Brahmic scripts: Original Invention; Badagu script

The Badagu script is a Brahmic abugida used to write the Badaga language. It was invented by Yogesh Raj in 1968, and various school primers and educational materials have been published in this script. It has 12 consonants, 27 basic consonants and 16 diacritic markers. Though the predominant script for writing Badaga remains Tamil, community-led efforts have increased its use across Ooty.

=== Tamil script ===
The Badagu language has been written in the Tamil script since 2009, based on orthographic reforms by Anandhan Raju, a native speaker and educator. Tamil remains the predominant script in the Udhagamandalam district.One unique feature is the usage of the nuqta (single dot below) not used in Tamil to denote allophonic sounds in Badaga.

Tamil Alphabet for Badaga (Badaga: படக)
Vowels
அ a IPA: a	ஆ ā IPA: aː	இ i IPA: i	
ஈ ī IPA: iː	உ u IPA: u	ஊ ū IPA: uː	
எ e IPA: e	ஏ ē IPA: eː	ஐ ai IPA: ai	
ஒ o IPA: o	ஓ ō IPA: oː	ஔ au IPA: au	
் ṁ IPA: m̃	ஃ ḥ IPA: h	𑌻 nukta	
Consonants
க k IPA: ka	க g IPA: ga	ங ṅ IPA: ŋa	
ச c IPA: t͡ʃa	ஜ j IPA: d͡ʒa	ஞ ñ IPA: ɲa	
ட ṭ IPA: ʈa	ட ḍ IPA: ɖa	ண ṇ IPA: ɳa	
த t IPA: t̪a	த d IPA: d̪a	ந n IPA: n̪a	
ப p IPA: pa	ப b IPA: ba	ம m IPA: ma	ய y IPA: ja
ர r IPA: ra	ல l IPA: la	வ v IPA: ʋa	ழ ḻ IPA: ɻa
ன ṉ IPA: na	ஸ s IPA: sa	ஹ h IPA: ha	ள ḷ IPA: ɭa

=== Kannada script ===
The earliest printed book using Kannada script was a Christian work, "Anga Kartagibba Yesu Kristana Olleya Suddiya Pustaka" by Basel Mission Press of Mangaluru in 1890. Badaga orthography generally avoids aspirated Kannada letters, instead denoting it through diacritics. The archaic ೞ, and its subjoined form, is used to denote the unique Badaga phoneme /ɻ/. Another unique adaptation for Badaga is the independent Candrabindu sign ಀ to denote the nasalised sound /m̃/.

Kannada Alphabet for Badaga (Badaga: ಬಡಗ)
Vowels
ಅ a IPA: a	ಆ ā IPA: aː	ಇ i IPA: i	
ಈ ī IPA: iː	ಉ u IPA: u	ಊ ū IPA: uː	
ಎ e IPA: e	ಏ ē IPA: eː	ಐ ai IPA: ai	
ಒ o IPA: o	ಓ ō IPA: oː	ಔ au IPA: au	
ಅಂ aṁ IPA: am̃	ಅಃ aḥ IPA: ah	ಀ ṁ IPA: m̃	
Consonants
ಕ k IPA: ka	ಗ g IPA: ga	ಙ ṅ IPA: ŋa	
ಚ c IPA: t͡ʃa	ಜ j IPA: d͡ʒa	ಞ ñ IPA: ɲa	
ಟ ṭ IPA: ʈa	ಡ ḍ IPA: ɖa	ಣ ṇ IPA: ɳa	
ತ t IPA: t̪a	ದ d IPA: d̪a	ನ n IPA: n̪a	
ಪ p IPA: pa	ಬ b IPA: ba	ಮ m IPA: ma	ಯ y IPA: ja
ರ r IPA: ra	ಲ l IPA: la	ವ v IPA: ʋa	ೞ ḻ IPA: ɻa
ಶ ś IPA: ʃa	ಸ s IPA: sa	ಹ h IPA: ha	ಳ ḷ IPA: ɭa

== Linguistic documentation ==
Badaga has been studied and documented by linguists. Several Badaga-English Dictionaries have been produced since the latter part of the nineteenth century.

A collection of proverbs and other traditional sayings of the Badaga has been collated and edited by Paul Hockings. It is the result of the work of many people, collecting material over many decades.

== Relevant literature ==
- Hockings, Paul. Counsel from the ancients: A study of Badaga proverbs, prayers, omens, and curses. Mouton de Gruyter, 1988. Archive.org
- Hockings, Paul, and Christiane Pilot-Raichoor. A Badaga and English dictionary — glossary and gazetteer. Manohar Publishers & Distributors, 2023. ISBN 978-93-91928-17-9
