= Kongarahalli =

- village
- Location in Karnataka, India Kongarahalli (India)
- Coordinates: 12.15°N 77.10°E
- Country: India
- State: Karnataka
- District: Chamarajanagar
- Talukas: Kollegal

Government
  - Body: Gram panchayat

Population (2001)
  - Total: 8,329

Languages
  - Official: Kannada
- Time zone: UTC+5:30 (IST)
- ISO 3166 code: IN-KA
- Vehicle registration: KA
- Website: karnataka.gov.in

Kongarahalli is a village in the southern state of Karnataka, India. It is located in the Kollegal taluk of Chamarajanagar district.

== Demographics ==
As of 2001 India census, Kongarahalli had a population of 8329 with 4052 males and 4277 females.

== See also ==
- Chamarajanagar
- Districts of Karnataka
