= S. Srinivasan (Kural translator) =

Translation history

- Born: Kollegal, Karnataka, India
- Occupation: Civil engineer
- Known for: Translating Tirukkural into Kannada

S. Srinivasan is an Indian civil engineer, who is best known for translating the Tirukkural into Kannada.

== Biography ==
S. Srinivasan was born in Kollegal in Karnataka into a Tamil-speaking family. He did his schooling at Tharagapura and Alahalli villages. He then attended St. Philomena's College in Mysore and Sri Ramakrishna Mission Polytechnic at Coimbatore. He began his career in 1965 as civil engineer and retired in 2003. He then started writing for the Tamil magazine Udayam and came to be known to the Tamil readers as 'Udayam' Srinivasan. His translation of Girish Karnad's 'Hayavadhana' was staged at the Delhi Tamil Sangam.

In 2014, Srinivasan translated the entire Kural text into Kannada in verse. It was published by the Central Institute of Classical Tamil in Chennai.

== See also ==
- Tirukkural translations
- Tirukkural translations into Kannada
- List of translators
