= Ajjipura =

- Village
- Location in Karnataka, India Ajjipura (India)
- Coordinates: 12.15°N 77.10°E
- Country: India
- State: Karnataka
- District: Chamarajanagara
- Taluk: Hanur

Government
  - Body: Gram panchayat

Area
  - Total: 34.66 km^{2} (13.38 sq mi)
- Elevation: 736 m (2,415 ft)

Population (2011)
  - Total: 9,145
  - Density: 263.8/km^{2} (683.4/sq mi)

Languages
  - Official: Kannada
- Time zone: UTC+5:30 (IST)
- PIN: 571439
- Telephone code: 08224
- ISO 3166 code: IN-KA
- Vehicle registration: KA 10
- Nearest city: Kollegal

Ajjipura is a village in the southern state of Karnataka, India. It is located in the Hanur taluk of Chamarajanagar district. It is surrounded by Hanur, Ramapura, Cowdalli and Male Mahadeshwra Hills. Ajjipura is closely surrounded by Kurubaradoddi, Suleripalya (Kanchalli), Basappanadoddi and K Gundapura. Dommanagadde, G R Nagara, Naganna Nagara, Vaddaradoddi, Ambikapura are sub-villages.

== People ==
The popular spoken language is Kannada. Most of the people in Ajjipura and the surrounding villages are occupied in agriculture. Some of them are in business too. Also in the district around 150 - 160 number of Hitachi and JCB backhoe loader/excavator operators are from here, which made Chamarajanagara is the second largest district of operators in the State.

== Crops ==
Udutore Halla dam located near K Gundapura which serves water for cultivation to some of the lands of K Gundapura, Ajjipura, Basappanadoddi and Suleripalya (Kanchalli) villages. The majority of the crops are depending on seasonal rains, few are drilled bore-wells on their land to get water for agriculture. Depends on the water some major crops as Ragi(finger millet), bhatta(paddy), mekkejola(maize), kambu(pearl millet), hatti(cotton), arisina (turmeric), kabbu(sugarcane), suryakanti(sunflower), bellulli(garlic), nelagadale(groundnut) and some vegetables are cultivating here.

== Education ==
Government Higher Primary School providing education up to 7th. Currently JSS High School is the only school providing education up to 10th, which was established on 5 August 1985, apart from this a private school called Priyadarshini Vidyakendra provides education up to 7th, which was established in 1997. There is not much facility for Higher Education. Students have to travel around 8 to 30km to find degree colleges in nearby towns. For graduation need to choose more distanced cities like Mysuru and Bengaluru.

== Temples ==
The following major temples can be found around Ajjipura

1. Ankaala Parameswari Temple
2. Kote Maaramma Temple
3. Karagada Maaramma Temple
4. Kaalamma Temple
5. Om Shakthi Temple
6. Basaveswara Temple
7. Muneswara Temple
8. Jadeswamy Temple
9. Kanive Anjaneya Temple

== Demographics ==
As of 2011 India census, Ajjipura had a population of 9,145 of which 4,658 males and 4,487 females. Ajjipura has an average literacy rate of 58%, lesser than the national average of 59.5%: male literacy is 64% and female literacy is 51%. In Ajjipura, 12% of the population are under 6 years of age.

== See also ==
- Chamarajanagar
- Districts of Karnataka
