= Hoogya =

- village
- Location in Karnataka, India Hoogya (India)
- Coordinates: 12.15°N 77.10°E
- Country: India
- State: Karnataka
- District: Chamarajanagar
- Talukas: Kollegal

Government
  - Body: Gram panchayat

Population (2001)
  - Total: 8,131

Languages
  - Official: Kannada
- Time zone: UTC+5:30 (IST)

Hoogya is a village in the southern state of Karnataka, India. It is located in the Kollegal taluk of Chamarajanagar district.

== Demographics ==
As of 2001 India census, Hoogya had a population of 8131 with 4280 males and 3851 females.

== See also ==
- Chamarajanagar
- Districts of Karnataka
