= Shagya =

- Village
- Location in Karnataka, India Shagya (India)
- Coordinates: 12.15°N 77.10°E
- Country: India
- State: Karnataka
- District: Chamarajanagar
- Talukas: Kollegal

Government
  - Body: Gram panchayat

Population (2001)
  - Total: 5,802

Languages
  - Official: Kannada
- Time zone: UTC+5:30 (IST)
- Postal code: 571439
- ISO 3166 code: IN-KA

Shagya is a village in the southern state of Karnataka, India. It is located in the Kollegal taluk of the Chamarajanagar district.

== Demographics ==
As of the 2001 Indian census, Shagya had a population of 5,802, with 3,039 men and 2,763 women.

== See also ==
- Chamarajanagar
- Districts of Karnataka
