= Tellanur =

- village
- Location in Karnataka, India Tellanur (India)
- Coordinates: 12.15°N 77.10°E
- Country: India
- State: Karnataka
- District: Chamarajanagar
- Talukas: Kollegal

Government
  - Body: Gram panchayat

Population (2001)
  - Total: 6,993

Languages
  - Official: Kannada
- Time zone: UTC+5:30 (IST)
- ISO 3166 code: IN-KA

Tellanur is a village in the southern state of Karnataka, India. It is located in the Kollegal taluk of Chamarajanagar district.This is a gram panchayath which includes surrounding villages of Balagunase, Ankanapura, Masti gowdana doddi, Bolegowdana doddi, Chikkalluru.Tellanuru Maramma and Dannavva is the most popular god's in this area.They worship Malemahadeshwara, Kendagannayya also.

== Demographics ==
As of 2001 India census, Tellanur had a population of 6993 with 3575 males and 3418 females.

== See also ==
- Chamarajanagar
- Districts of Karnataka
