= Madhuvanahalli =

Madhuvanahalli jenukadinahalli
- village
- Location in Karnataka, India Madhuvanahalli (India)
- Coordinates: 12°9′14.287″N 77°8′48.817″E
- Country: India
- State: Karnataka
- District: Chamarajanagar
- Talukas: Kollegal

Government
  - Body: Gram panchayat

Population (2001)
  - Total: 7,866

Languages
  - Official: Kannada
- Time zone: UTC+5:30 (IST)
- PIN: 571801
- Telephone code: 08224
- ISO 3166 code: IN-KA
- Vehicle registration: ka
- Nearest city: kollegal
- Lok Sabha constituency: chamarajanagar
- Vidhan Sabha constituency: hanur
- Website: karnataka.gov.in

Madhuvanahalli is a village in the southern state of Karnataka, India. It is located in the Kollegal taluk of Chamarajanagar district in Karnataka.

== Demographics ==
As of 2001 India census, Madhuvanahalli had a population of 7866 with 4023 males and 3843 females.

== See also ==
- Chamarajanagar
- Districts of Karnataka
