= Doddinduvadi =

- village
- Location in Karnataka, India Doddinduvadi (India)
- Coordinates: 12.15°N 77.10°E
- Country: India
- State: Karnataka
- District: Chamarajanagar
- Talukas: Kollegal

Population (2001)
  - Total: 5,700

Languages
  - Official: Kannada
- Time zone: UTC+5:30 (IST)
- ISO 3166 code: IN-KA

Doddinduvadi is a village in the southern state of Karnataka, India. It is located in the Kollegal taluk of Chamarajanagar district.

== Demographics ==
As of 2001 India census, Doddinduvadi had a population of 5700 with 2890 males and 2810 females.

== See also ==
- Chamarajanagar
- Districts of Karnataka
