= Kunagalli =

- village
- Location in Karnataka, India Kunagalli (India)
- Coordinates: 12°6′50.714″N 77°4′54.267″E
- Country: India
- State: Karnataka
- District: Chamarajanagar
- Talukas: Kollegal

Government
  - Body: Gram panchayat

Population (2001)
  - Total: 5,015

Languages
  - Official: Kannada
- Time zone: UTC+5:30 (IST)
- PIN: 571442

Kunagalli is a village in the southern state of Karnataka, India. It is located in the Kollegal taluk of Chamarajanagar district.

== Demographics ==
As of 2001 India census, Kunagalli had a population of 5015 with 2538 males and 2477 females.

== See also ==
- Chamarajanagar
- Districts of Karnataka
