= Agathagowdanahalli =

- village
- Interactive map of Agathagowdanahalli
- Coordinates: 11.8811°N 76.6721°E
- Country: India
- State: Karnataka
- District: Chamarajanagar
- Talukas: Gundlupet

Government
  - Body: Village Panchayat

Languages
  - Official: Kannada
- Time zone: UTC+5:30 (IST)
- ISO 3166 code: IN-KA
- Vehicle registration: KA
- Nearest city: Chamarajanagar
- Civic agency: Village Panchayat
- Website: karnataka.gov.in

Agathagowdanahalli is a village in the southern state of Karnataka, India. It is located in the Gundlupet taluk of Chamarajanagar district.

== See also ==
- Chamarajanagar
- Districts of Karnataka
