= Chamarajnagara =

Chamarajnagara is an alternate way to spell the following places in India:

- Chamarajanagar, a city in the state of Karnataka
- Chamarajanagar district, the district thereof
