= Bandalli =

- village
- Location in Karnataka, India Bandalli (India)
- Coordinates: 12.15°N 77.10°E
- Country: India
- State: Karnataka
- District: Chamarajanagar
- Established: 1300CE - 1400CE
- Taluk: Kollegal

Population (2001)
  - Total: 9,418

Languages
  - Official: Kannada
- Time zone: UTC+5:30 (IST)
- ISO 3166 code: IN-KA

Bandalli is a village in the southern state of Karnataka, India. It is located in the Kollegal taluk of Chamarajanagar district.

Bandalli betta is the place you can have a good trek with having permission from Kaveri Vannya Dhama Bandalli.

Nearest places to visit

1 Hukunda (approx. 15 km)

2 Mekedhatu (20 km)

3 Bandalli betta

4 Bandallidurga - fort (less than 1 km)

5 Kootle Basaveshwara Betta (20 km)

6 Sangama (25 km)

7 Chikkaluru (25 km)

8 Mutatti (35 km)

== Demographics ==
As of 2001 India census, Bandalli had a population of 9418 with 4936 males and 4482 females.

== See also ==
- Chamarajanagar
- Districts of Karnataka
