= Amachavadi =

- village
- Location in Karnataka, India Amachavadi (India)
- Coordinates: 11.94°N 76.95°E
- Country: India
- State: Karnataka
- District: Chamarajanagar
- Talukas: Chamarajanagar

Population (2001)
  - Total: 6,383

Languages
  - Official: Kannada
- Time zone: UTC+5:30 (IST)
- Postal code: 571127

Amachavadi is a village in the southern state of Karnataka, India. It is located in the Chamarajanagar taluk of Chamarajanagar district in Karnataka.

The village is house to many small temples, Maastigallu and Veeragallu in the village, which are memorial stones for slain warriors.

== Demographics ==
The village has population of 7221 of which 3524 are males while 3697 are females as per Population Census 2011.

== See also ==
- Chamarajanagar
- Districts of Karnataka
