= Hebbasur =

- village
- Location in Karnataka, India Hebbasur (India)
- Coordinates: 11.94°N 76.95°E
- Country: India
- State: Karnataka
- District: Chamarajanagar
- Talukas: Chamarajanagar

Government
  - Body: Gram panchayat

Population (2001)
  - Total: 5,076

Languages
  - Official: Kannada
- Time zone: UTC+5:30 (IST)
- ISO 3166 code: IN-KA

Hebbasur is a village in the southern state of Karnataka, India. It is located in the Chamarajanagar taluk of Chamarajanagar district.

== Demographics ==
As of 2001 India census, Hebbasur had a population of 5076 with 2586 males and 2490 females.

== See also ==
- Chamarajanagar
- Districts of Karnataka
