= Biligiriranga Hills =

Wildlife sanctuary in South India

Biligirirangana Hills
- IUCN category IV (habitat/species management area)
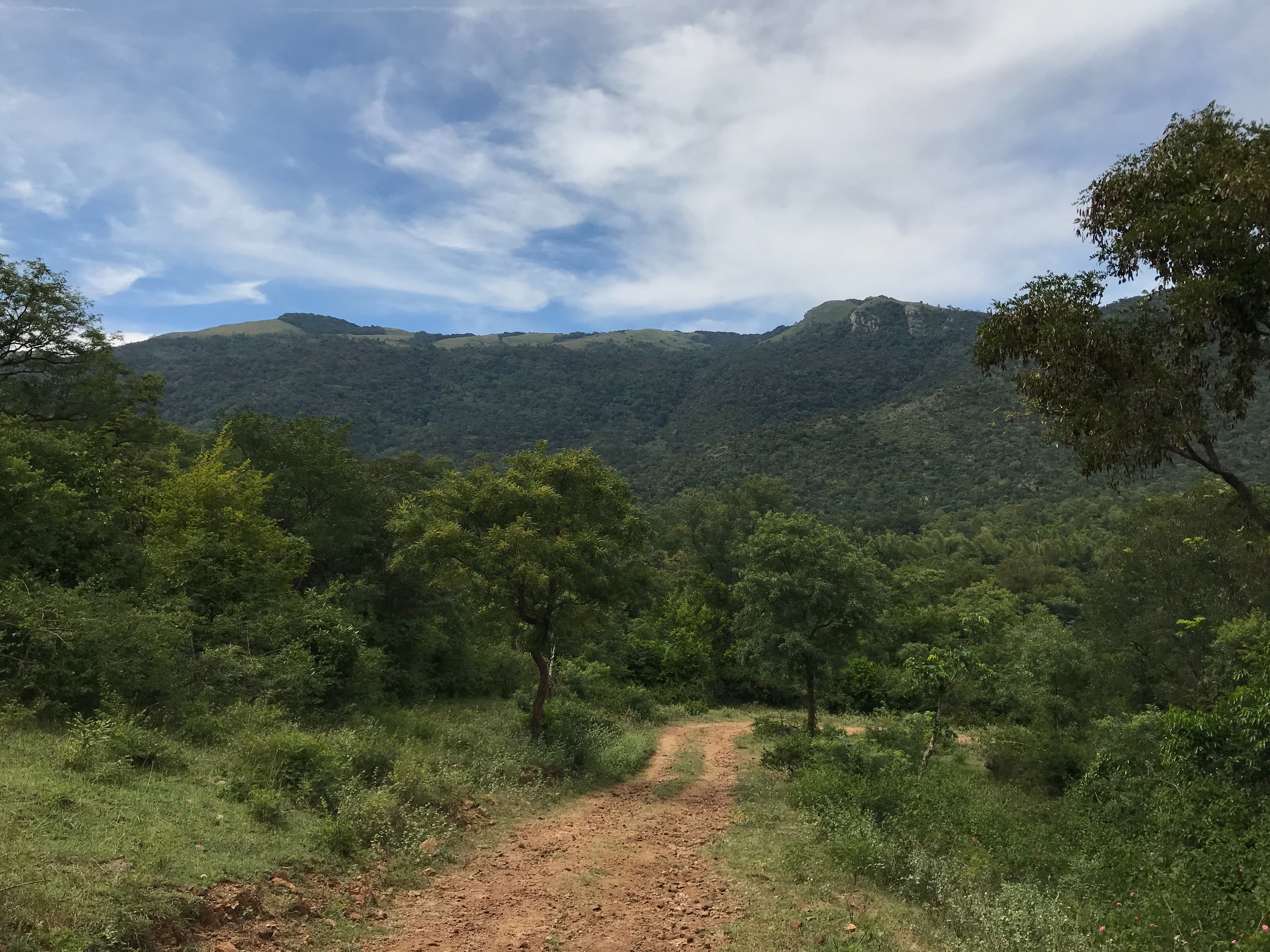
- Peaks of Hokkubare and Honnebare

- Location within Karnataka Location within India

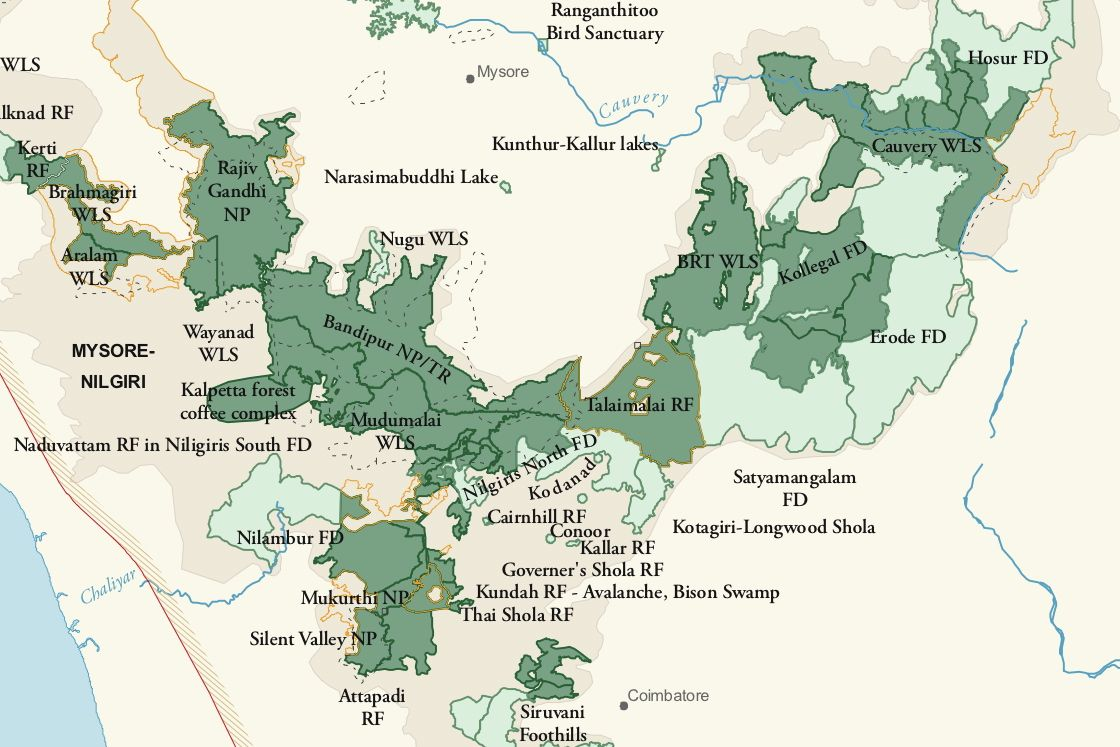
- Map of Nilgiris Biosphere Reserve, showing Biligiriranga Swamy Temple Wildlife Sanctuary in relation to multiple contiguous protected areas
- Interactive map of Biligirirangana Hills
- Location: Yelandur Taluk, Chamarajanagar, India
- Nearest city: Kollegal 30 kilometres (19 mi)
- Coordinates: 11°59′38″N 77°8′26″E
- Elevation: 1,707 m (5,600 ft)
- Established: 27 June 1974
- Governing body: Karnataka Forest Department

The Biligirirangana betta or Biligiriranga Hills (as referred to in biology and geology) is a hill range situated in Chamarajanagar District in south-western Karnataka, at its border with Tamil Nadu (Erode District) in South India. The area is called Biligiri Ranganatha Swamy Temple Wildlife Sanctuary or simply BRT Wildlife Sanctuary. It is a protected reserve under the Wildlife Protection Act of 1972. Being close to the Eastern Ghats as well as the Western Ghats, the sanctuary has floral and faunal associations with both regions. The site was declared a tiger reserve in January 2011 by the Government of Karnataka, a few months after approval from India's National Tiger Conservation Authority.

== Location ==
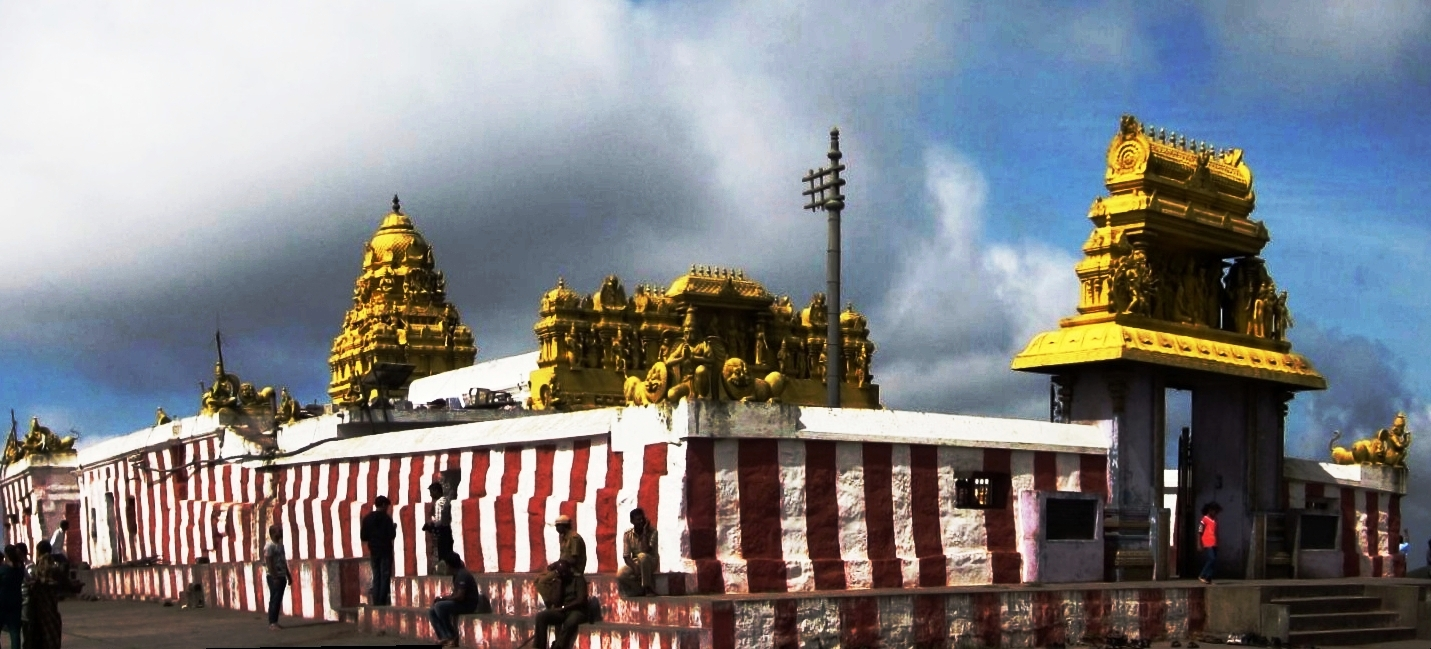
Biligiri Ranganatha Swamy temple

The hills are located at the north-west of the Western Ghats and the westernmost edge of the Eastern Ghats. Thus this area supports a diverse flora and fauna in view of the various habitat types present. A wildlife sanctuary of 322.4 square kilometres (124.5 sq mi) was created around the temple on 27 June 1974, and enlarged to 539.52 square kilometres (208.31 sq mi) on 14 January 1987. The sanctuary derives its name Biligiri (white hill in Kannada) from the white rock face that constitutes the major hill crowned with the temple of Ranganathaswamy (Vishnu), a major deity in Hinduism, or from the white mist and the silver clouds that cover these hills for a greater part of the year. An annual festival is held in the month of April, draws pilgrims from far and wide. Once in two years, the Soliga Tribe presents a 1-foot and 9 inches slipper, made of skin, to the deity in Biligiriranga Hills.

The hills are in the Yelandur, Kollegal and Chamarajanagar talukas of Chamarajanagar District of Karnataka. They are contiguous with hills in Sathyamangalam Wildlife Sanctuary in Erode District of Tamil Nadu to the south. By road, they are about 90 kilometres (56 mi) from Mysore and 160 kilometres (99 mi) from Bangalore. The road leading to the village on top of the hills may be approached either from Yelandur or Chamarajanagar. Kyathadevara Gudi or K Gudi is located close to BR Hills, where safari is conducted.

== Geography ==
The BR hills are a starting point of the Eastern Ghats and contact the border of the Western Ghats, allowing animals to move between them and facilitating gene flow between populations of species in these areas. Thus, this sanctuary serves as an important biological bridge for the biota of the entire Deccan Plateau.

The BR hills along with the Male Mahadeshwara Hills (MM Hills) range form a distinctly unusual ridge running north–south amidst the plains of Bangalore (~900 m), Mysore (~800 m) and Krishnagiri(~450 m). The peaks of these lofty ranges rise as high as 1,800 metres (5,900 ft) (BR hills 1,400–1,800 metres (4,600–5,900 ft); MM Hills 1,000–1,200 metres (3,300–3,900 ft)). The highest hill is Kattari Betta, at 1800 metres. Various observations point to a possible biogeographic link between BR hills and Nilgiri ranges.

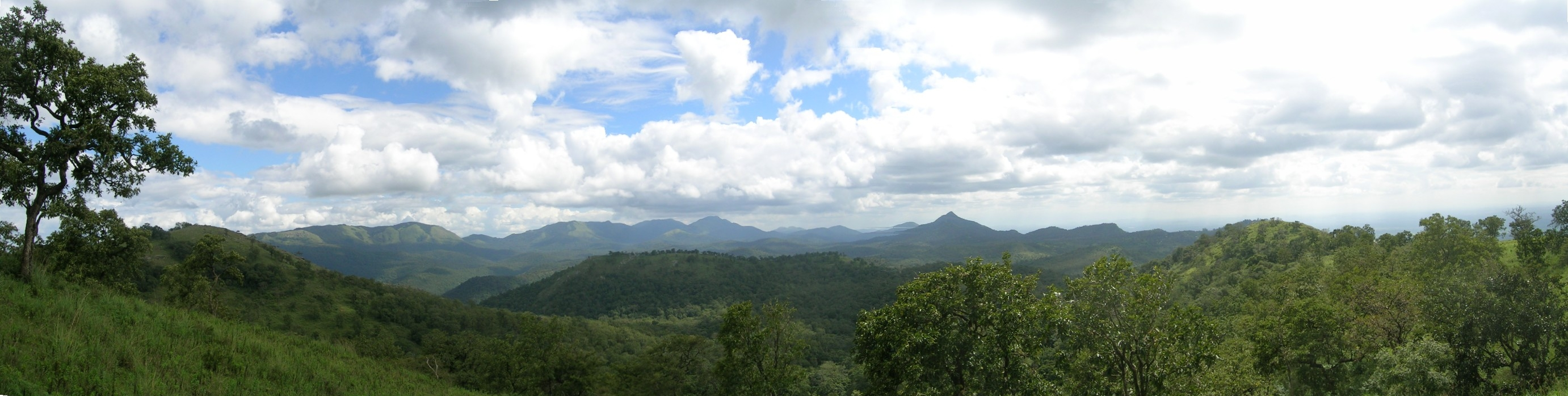
Panoramic view of the Biligiriranga Hills. The pointed peak is Malkibetta, to its left is the high ridge of Honnematti.

Biogeographically, the sanctuary is unique. It is located between 11° and 12° N and the ridges of the hills run in the north–south direction. It is a projection of the Western Ghats in a north-easterly direction and meets the splintered hills of the Eastern Ghats at 78° E. This unique extension / offshoot of Western Ghats constitutes a live bridge between the Eastern Ghats and Western Ghats with the sanctuary located almost in the middle of this bridge. Thus, the biota of BRT sanctuary can be expected to be predominantly of Western Ghats in nature with significant proportion of eastern elements as well.

== Climate and vegetation ==
The sanctuary, ~35 km long north–south and ~15 km wide east–west, is spread over an area of 540 km^{2} with a wide variation in mean temperature (9 °C to 16 °C minimum and 20 °C to 38 °C maximum) and annual rainfall (600 mm at the base and 3000 mm at the top of the hills) The hill ranges, within the sanctuary raise as high as 1200 m above the basal plateau of 600 m and run north–south in two ridges. The wide range of climatic conditions along with the altitude variations within the small area of the sanctuary have translated it into a highly heterogeneous mosaic of habitats such that we find almost all major forest vegetation types – scrub, deciduous, riparian, evergreen, sholas and grasslands.

The forests harbour close to 800 species of plants from various families and shows a close affinity to the Western Ghats.

== Flora and fauna ==
The Biligiris are charnockite hills, covered with tropical dry broadleaf forest, part of the South Deccan Plateau dry deciduous forests ecoregion. The forests range from scrub forests at lower elevations, degraded by over-use, to the tall deciduous forests typical of the ecoregion, to stunted shola forests and montane grasslands at the highest elevations, which exceed 1800 meters. The forests form an important wildlife corridor between the Western Ghats and the Eastern Ghats, linking the largest populations of Asian elephants and tigers in southern India.

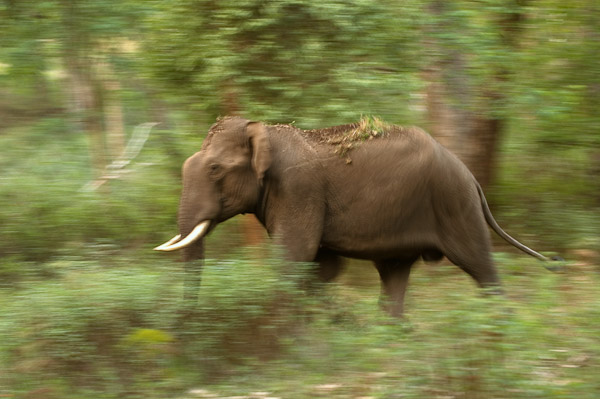
Bull elephant walking in BR Hills forest

The most conspicuous mammals in the BR Hills are the herds of wild elephants. The BR hills is the only forest east of the main Western Ghats mountain ranges in the central southern peninsula to harbor these pachyderms in large numbers. The forests were the study area for R. Sukumar, a scientist who studied the elephants of the area in the early eighties. A recent (2017) survey has revealed the presence of 62 tigers in this sanctuary. The forests are well known for many gaur, the largest bovines. BR hills are a good place for viewing many other large and small animals. There are about 26 species of mammals recorded in the sanctuary.

The other mammals include sambhar, chital, the shy barking deer which are quite common here and the rare four-horned antelope. Carnivores include tigers, leopards, wild dogs, lesser cats and sloth bears and among arboreal mammals two species of primates and three species of squirrels including the giant flying squirrel are recorded. A recent (2017) survey of tigers by DNA analysis of scat samples has revealed 62 tigers, although the number may be more. 254 species of birds have been recorded in the BR hills. These include the enigmatic southern population of the white-winged tit (Parus nuchalis), a specimen of which was collected by R. C. Morris and is now housed in the Natural History museum at Tring. A recently discovered species is the microhylid frog Microhyla sholigari, named after the Soligas, an indigenous tribe that inhabit these hills.

== Threats ==
Quarrying in the fringes of the hills is rampant after the brief lull of activities during the time when the dreaded bandit Veerappan was on the run. After his death, the quarrying activities have taken off with renewed vigour with strong political backing. The forest department and the local NGOs were instrumental in banning disposal of plastic within the sanctuary. After wildlife environmentalist, Giridhar Kulkarni informed the NTCA of the proliferation of illicit resorts inside the tiger reserve, the Chief wildlife warden of Karnataka recently issued orders against illegal resorts and homestays in the BRT Tiger Reserve.

== Gallery ==
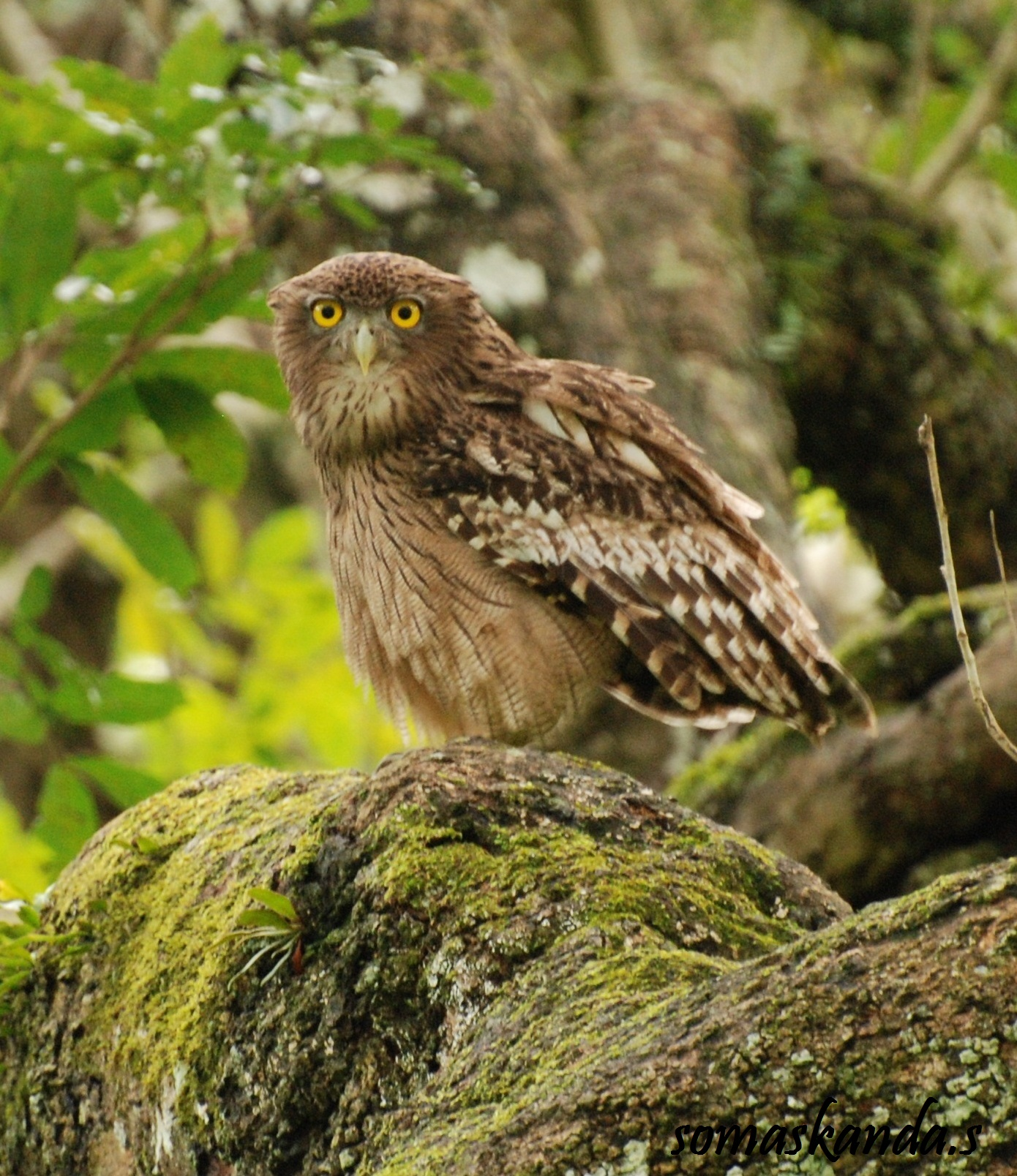
Brown fish owl, BRT Chamarajanagar

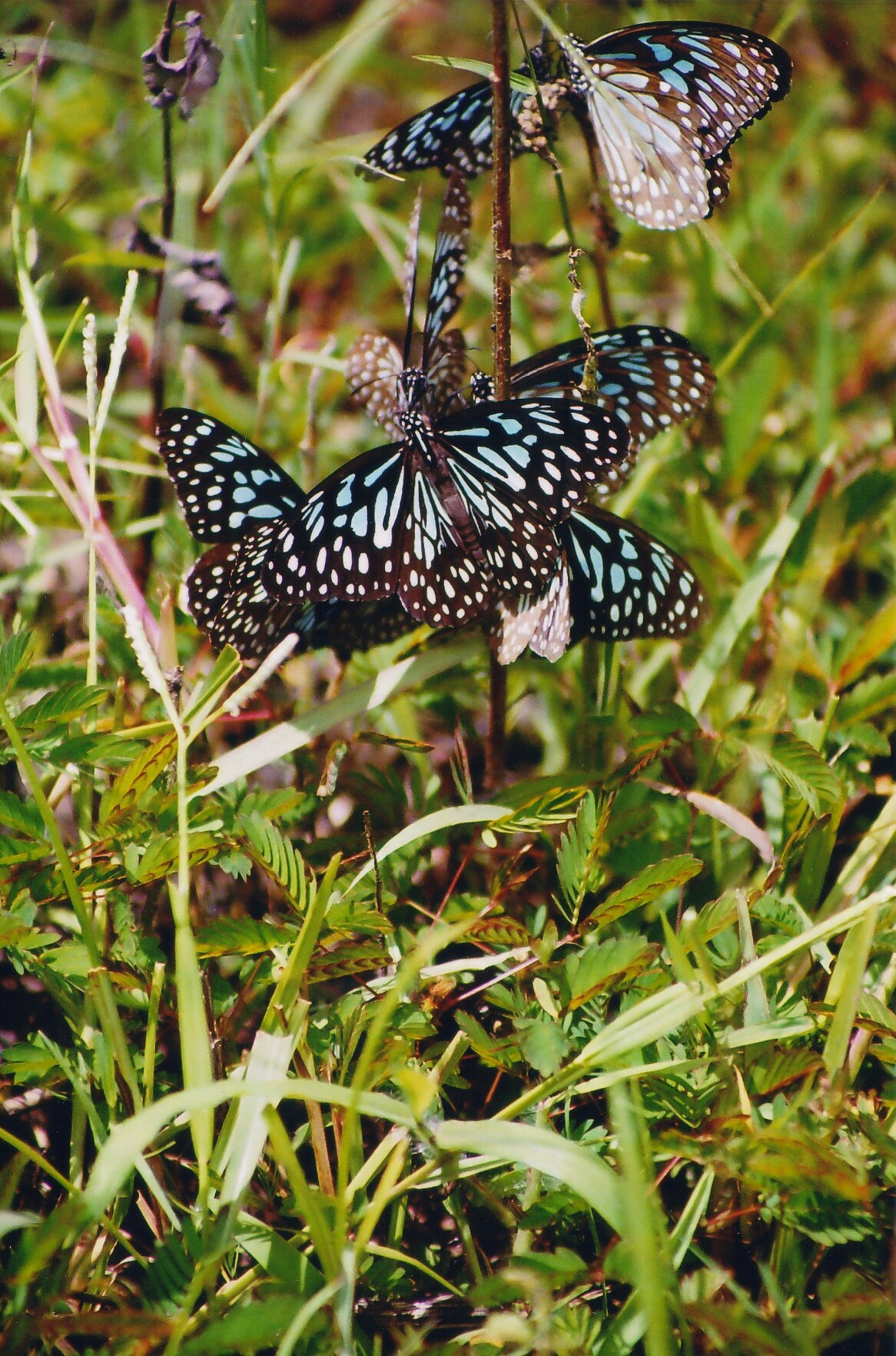
Dark blue tiger butterflies, BRT WLS Chamarajanagar

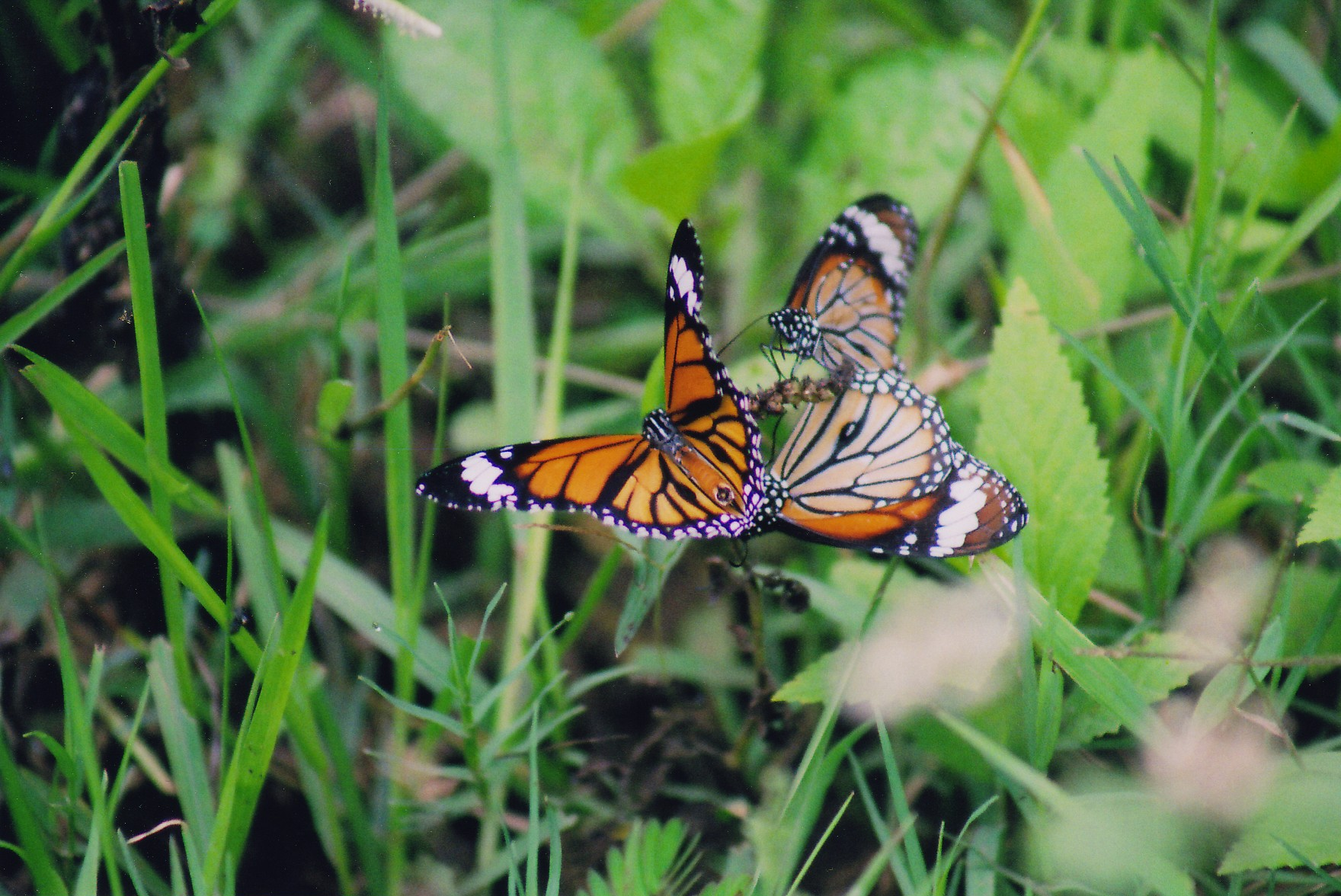
Striped tiger and common Indian crow butterflies, BRT WLS Chamarajanagar

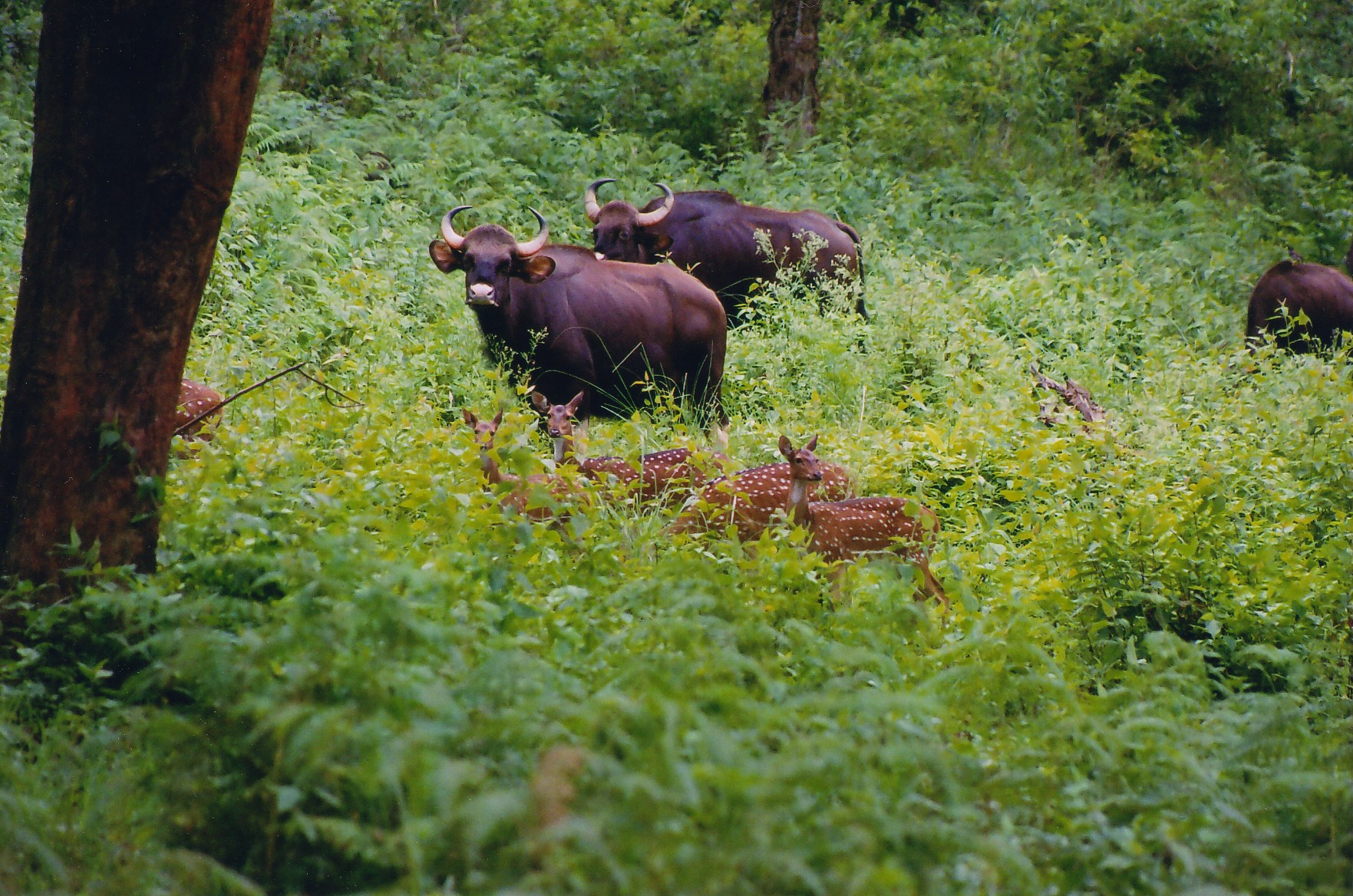
Gaur (bison) chital herd, BRT WLS Chamarajanagar

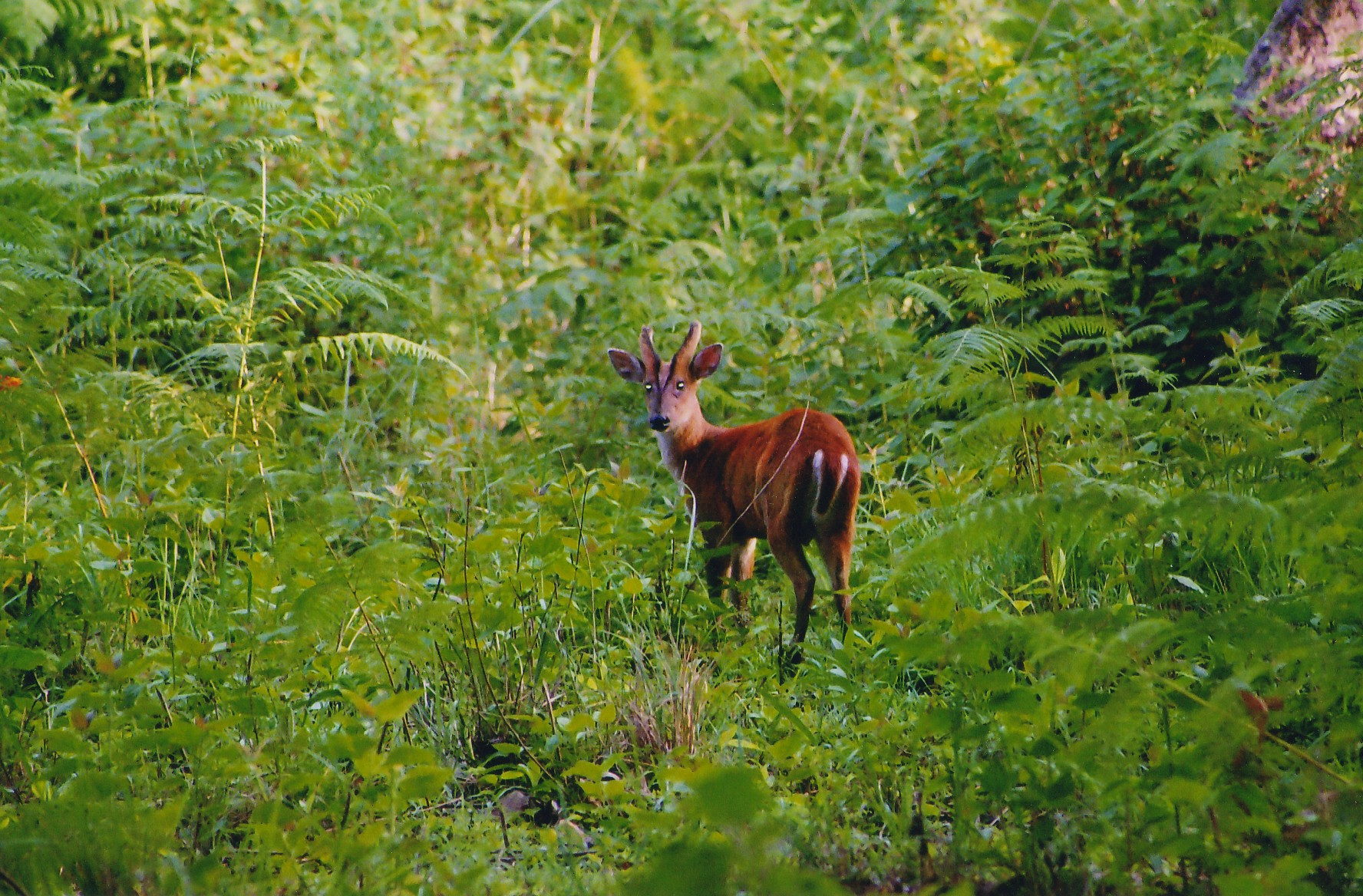
Common Indian muntjac or barking deer (male), BRT WLS Chamarajanagar

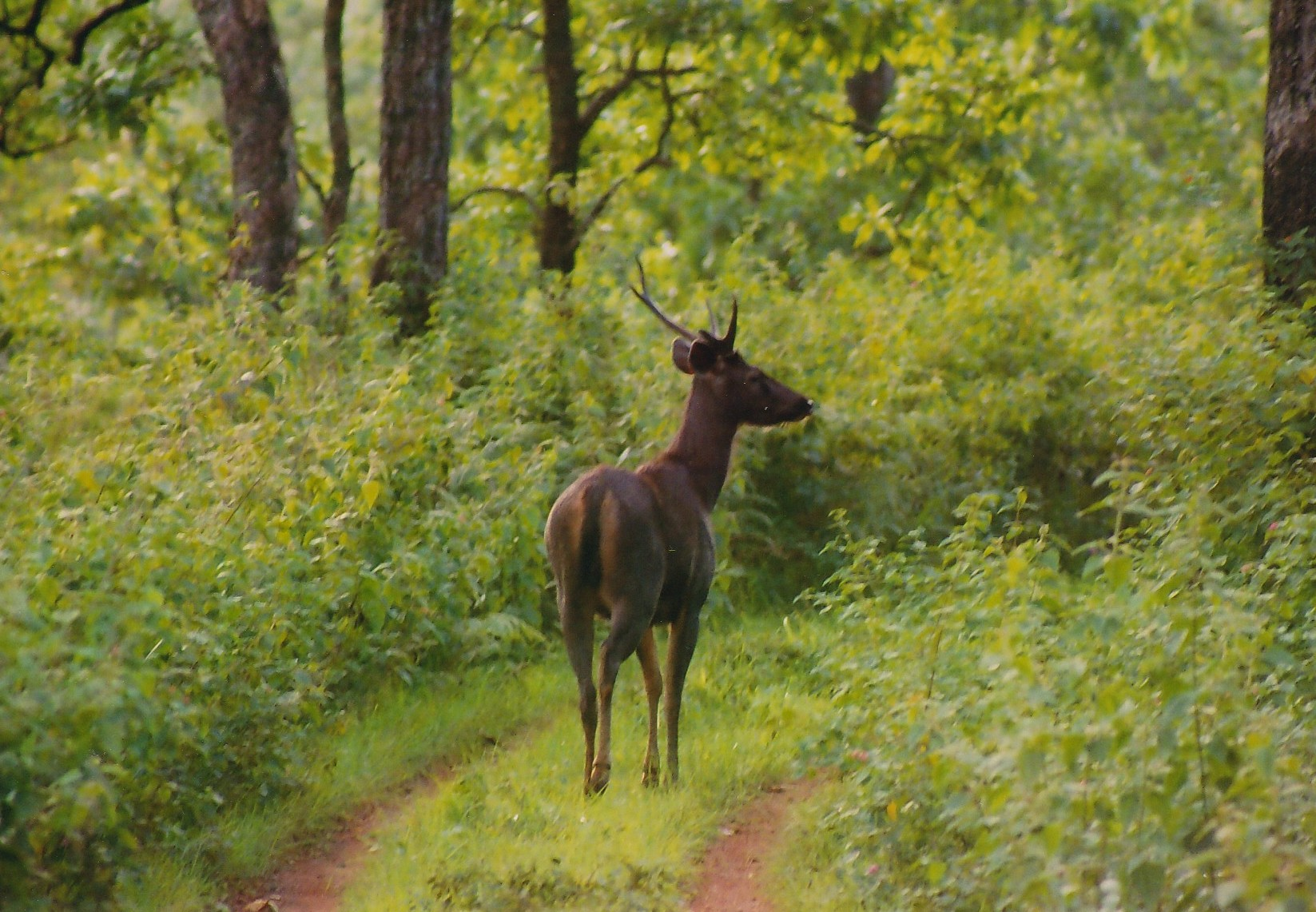
Sambar stag, BRT WLS Chamarajanagar

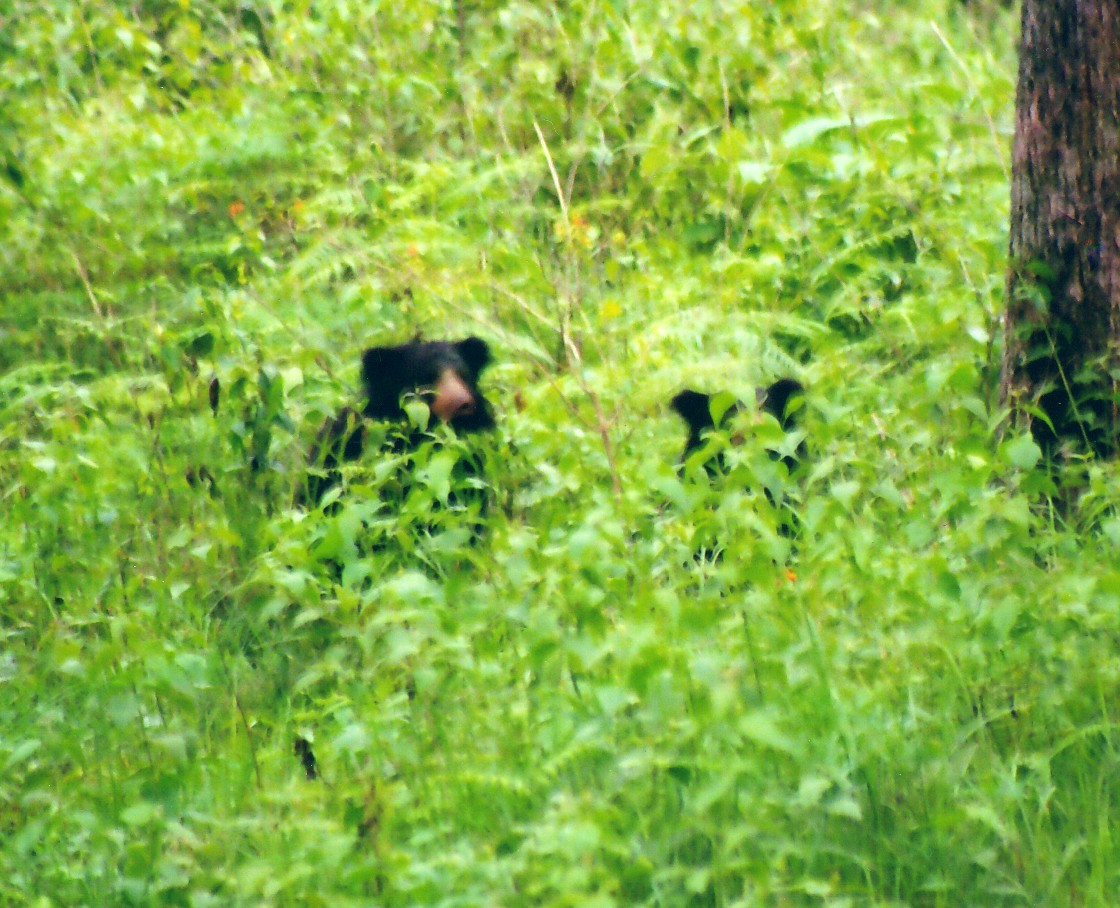
Sloth bear pair, BRT WLS Chamarajanagar

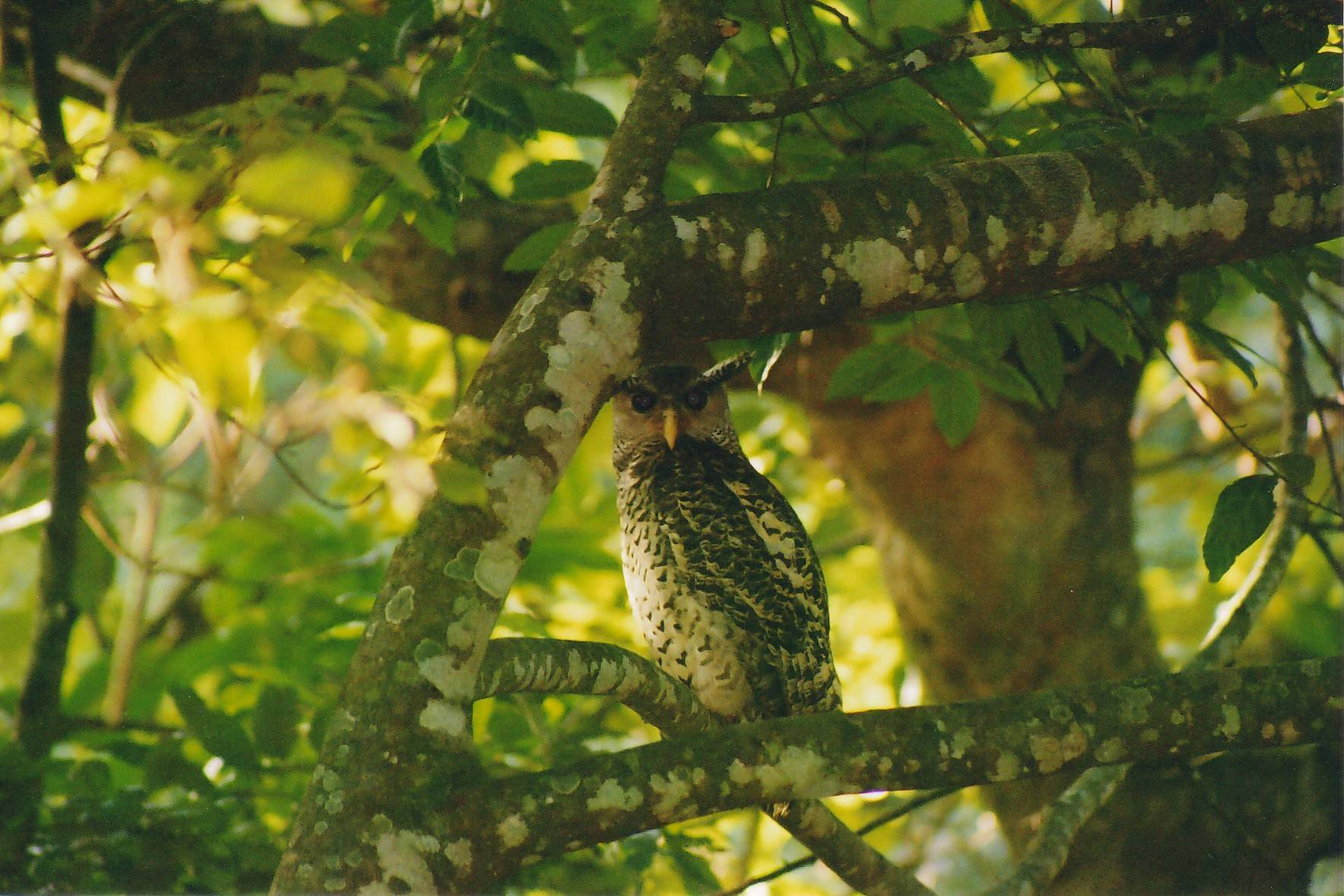
Spot bellied eagle owl, BRT WLS Chamarajanagar

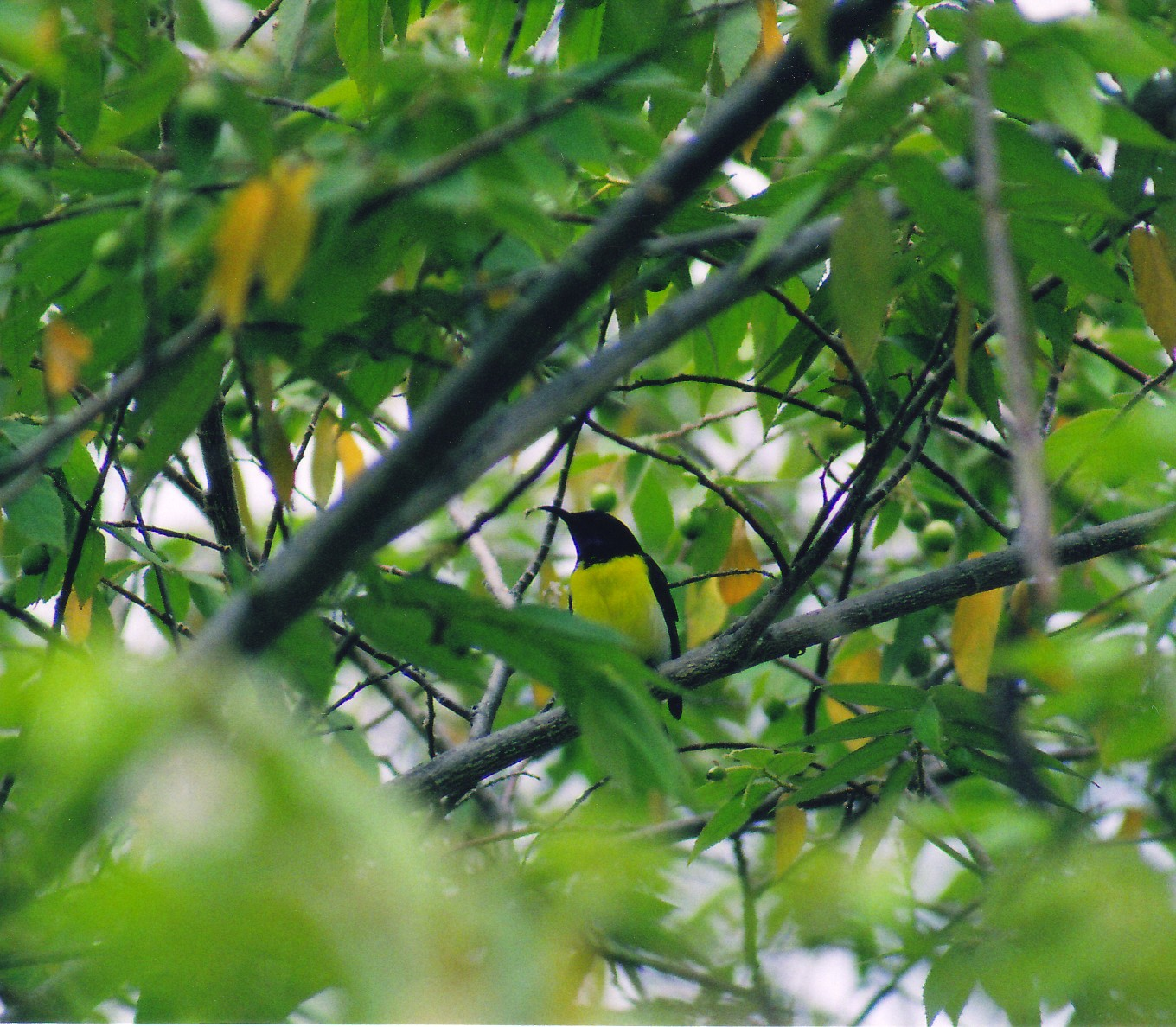
Purple rumped sunbird, BRT WLS Chamarajanagar

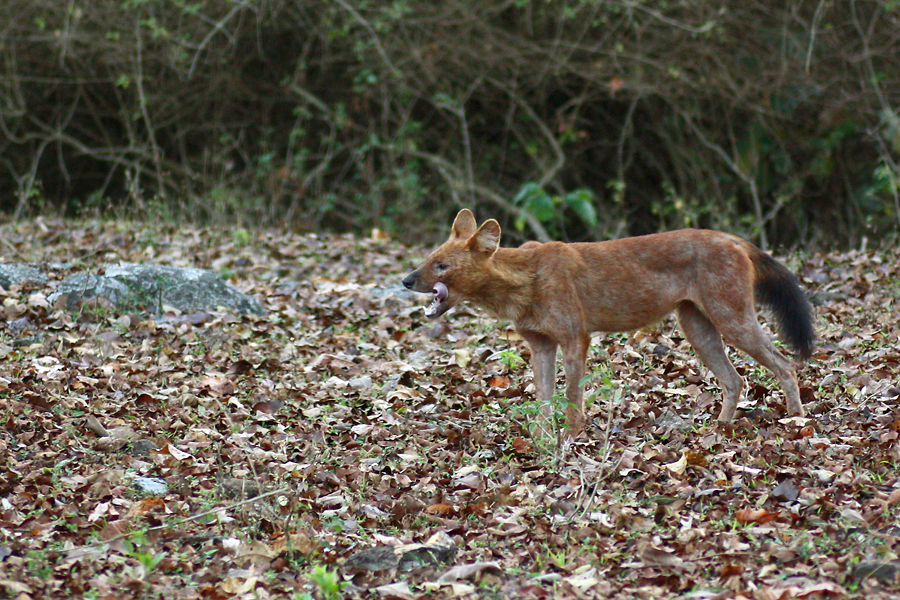
Dhole at Biligiriranga Hills, Karnataka

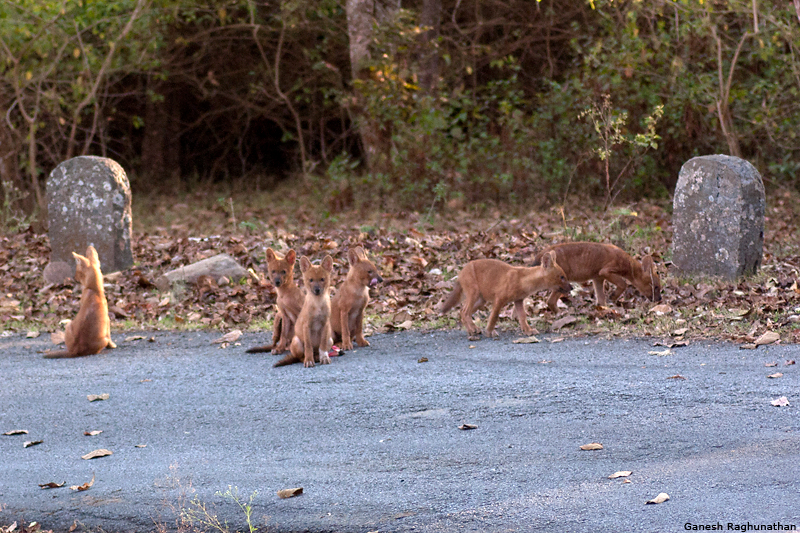
Dhole pups at Biligiriranga Hills, Karnataka

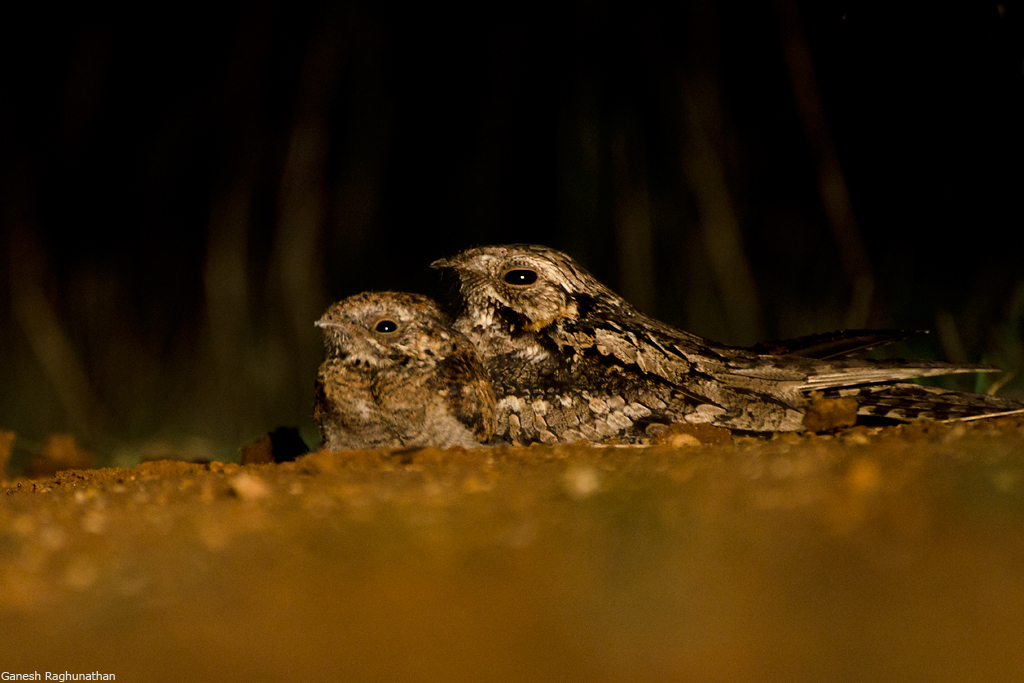
Nightjar at Biligiriranga Hills, Karnataka

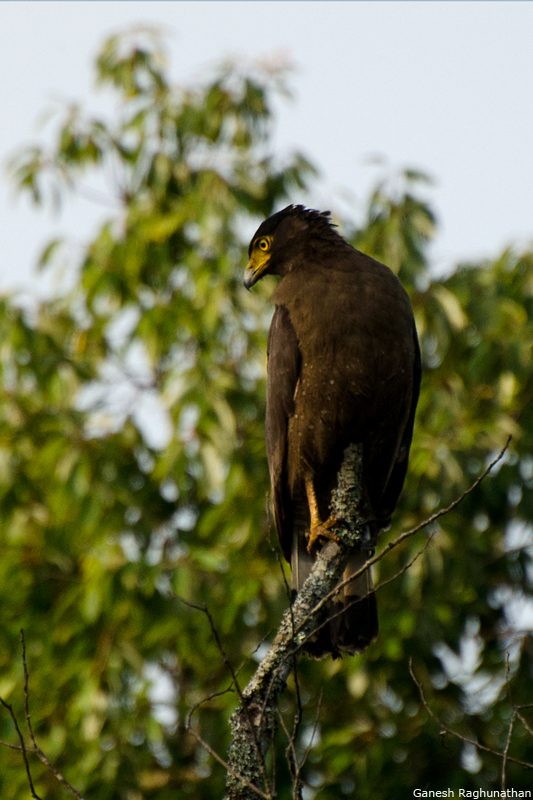
Crested Serpent Eagle at Biligiriranga Hills, Karnataka

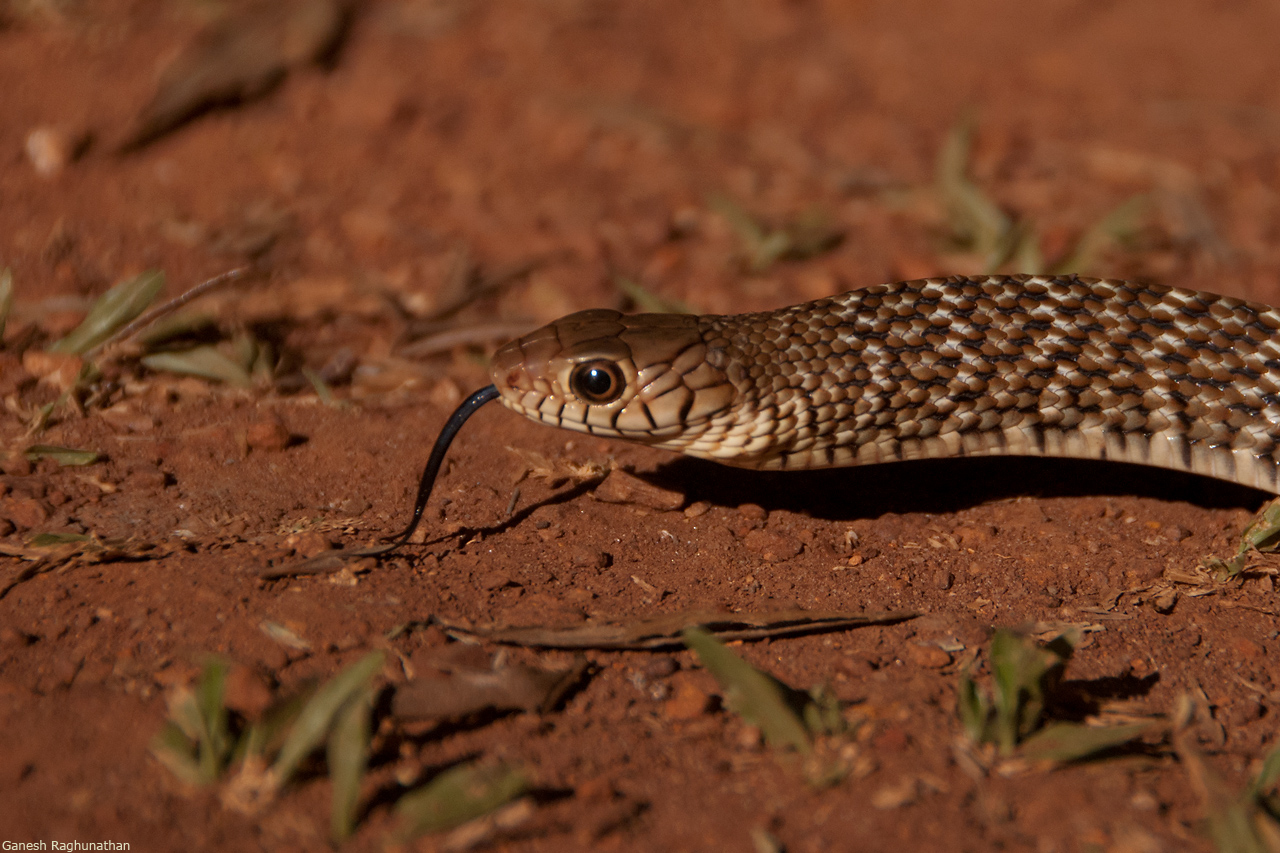
Rat snake display in Biligiriranga Hills, Karnataka
