= Alahalli =

- village
- Location in Karnataka, India Alahalli (India)
- Coordinates: 13°15′55″N 77°30′44″E
- Country: India
- State: Karnataka
- District: Bangalore Urban
- Talukas: Bangalore South

Government
  - Type: Panchayat raj
  - Body: Gram panchayat

Population (2001)
  - Total: 7,137

Languages
  - Official: Kannada
- Time zone: UTC+5:30 (IST)
- ISO 3166 code: IN-KA
- Vehicle registration: KA
- Website: karnataka.gov.in

Alahalli is a village in the southern state of Karnataka, India. It is located in the Bangalore South taluk of Bangalore Urban district in Karnataka.

== Demographics ==
As of 2001 India census, Alahalli had a population of 7137 with 3590 males and 3547 females.
