= Kollegal =

Kollegala
- City
- Kollegala
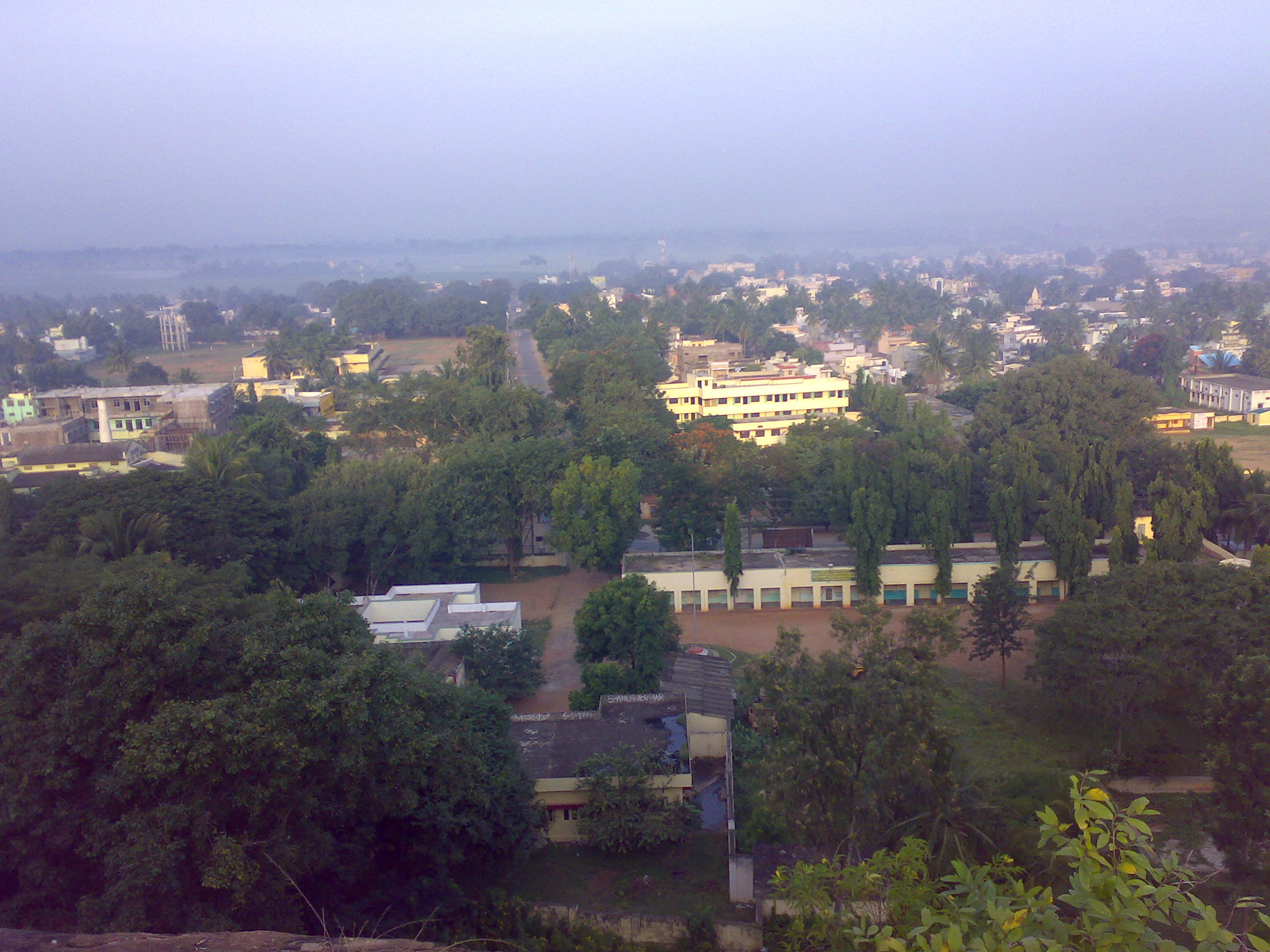
- Kollegala City from Maradi Gudda
- Nickname: Silk City
- Location in Karnataka, India Kollegala (India)
- Coordinates: 12°9′11.402″N 77°6′37.668″E
- Country: India
- State: Karnataka
- District: Chamarajanagar
- Founder: Kolava Muni, Galava Muni

Government
  - Body: City Municipal Council

Area
  - City: 27.47 km^{2} (10.61 sq mi)
  - Rural: 395 km^{2} (153 sq mi)
- Elevation: 660 m (2,170 ft)

Population (2011)
  - City: 57,149
  - Density: 2,080/km^{2} (5,388/sq mi)
  - Rural: 289,638

Languages
  - Official: Kannada
- Time zone: UTC+5:30 (IST)
- PIN: 571440
- Area code: 08224
- Vehicle registration: KA-10
- Website: www.kollegalacity.mrc.gov.in

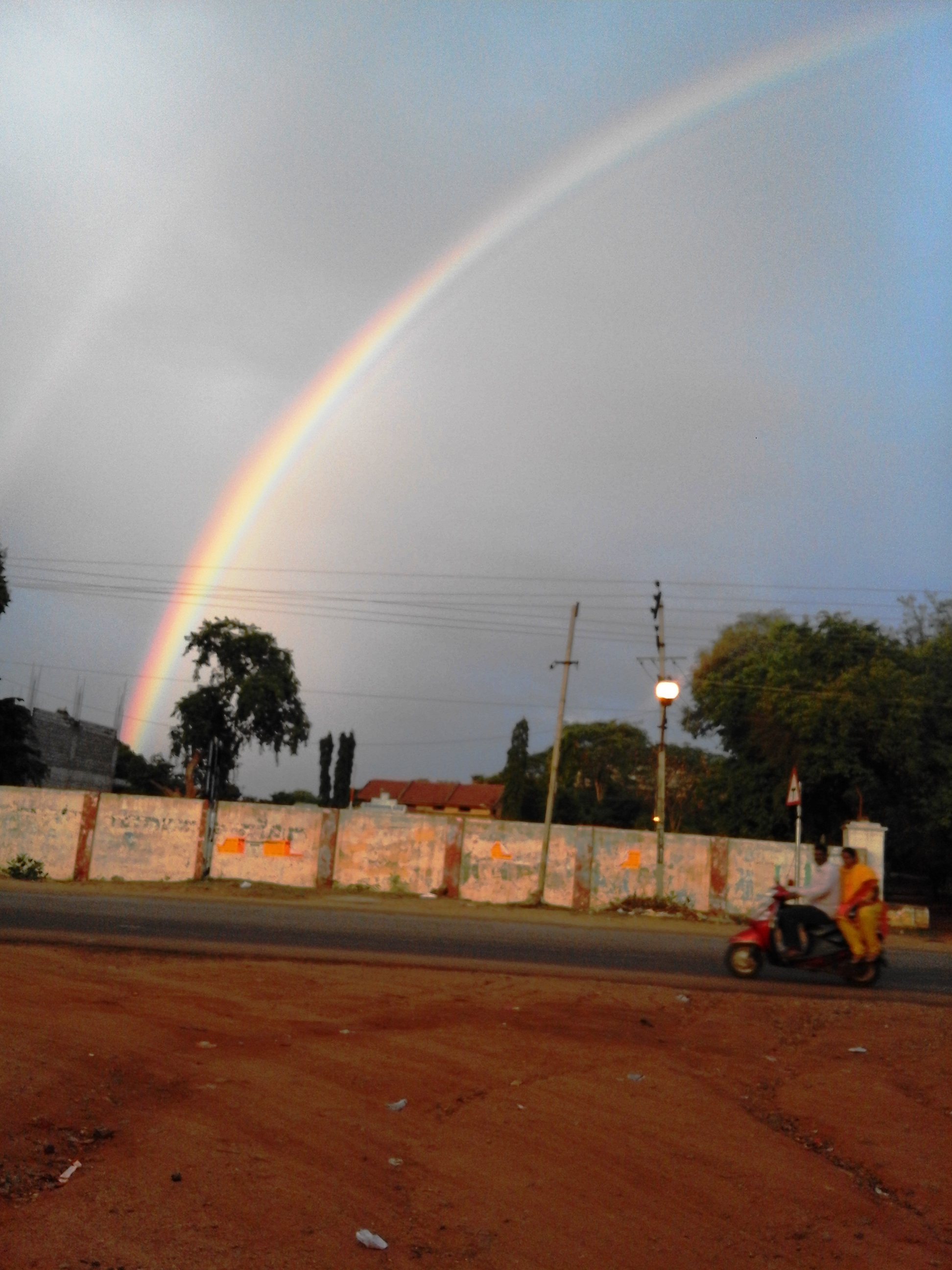
BSNL office, Kollegala

Kollegala (or Kollegal) is the Major taluk in the Chamarajanagara District of Karnataka State in the south of India. Kollegala is well known for its silk industry which attracts traders from all over the state.

== History ==
Until 1956, Kollegala was part of the Coimbatore district of the Madras Presidency. The States Reorganisation Act of 1956 moved Kollegala to Karnataka primarily organising it along linguistic lines. Kollegal is the name derived from the names of two hermits namely 'Kauhala' and 'Galava' who were believed to be instrumental in the development of Kollegala. Kollegala, also called "Silk City", is famous for its handloom silk saree industry.

Kollegala serves as a center for pre-university education in the region. Well known schools in Kollegal include Lions High School, Sree Vasavi Vidya Kendra, St. Francis Assisi High School, Nisarga Independent PU college, Seventh Day Adventist High School, and Mudigundam Gurukaar Subappa Veerappa (MGSV), and Mahadeshwara Degree College.

Singanalur, Kollegala is the hometown of Legendary Kannada thespian, the demigod of Karnataka, Dr.Rajkumar. Kollegala was one of the areas which played host to the activities of Veerappan, a notorious bandit who smuggled sandalwood and poached elephants for their tusks.

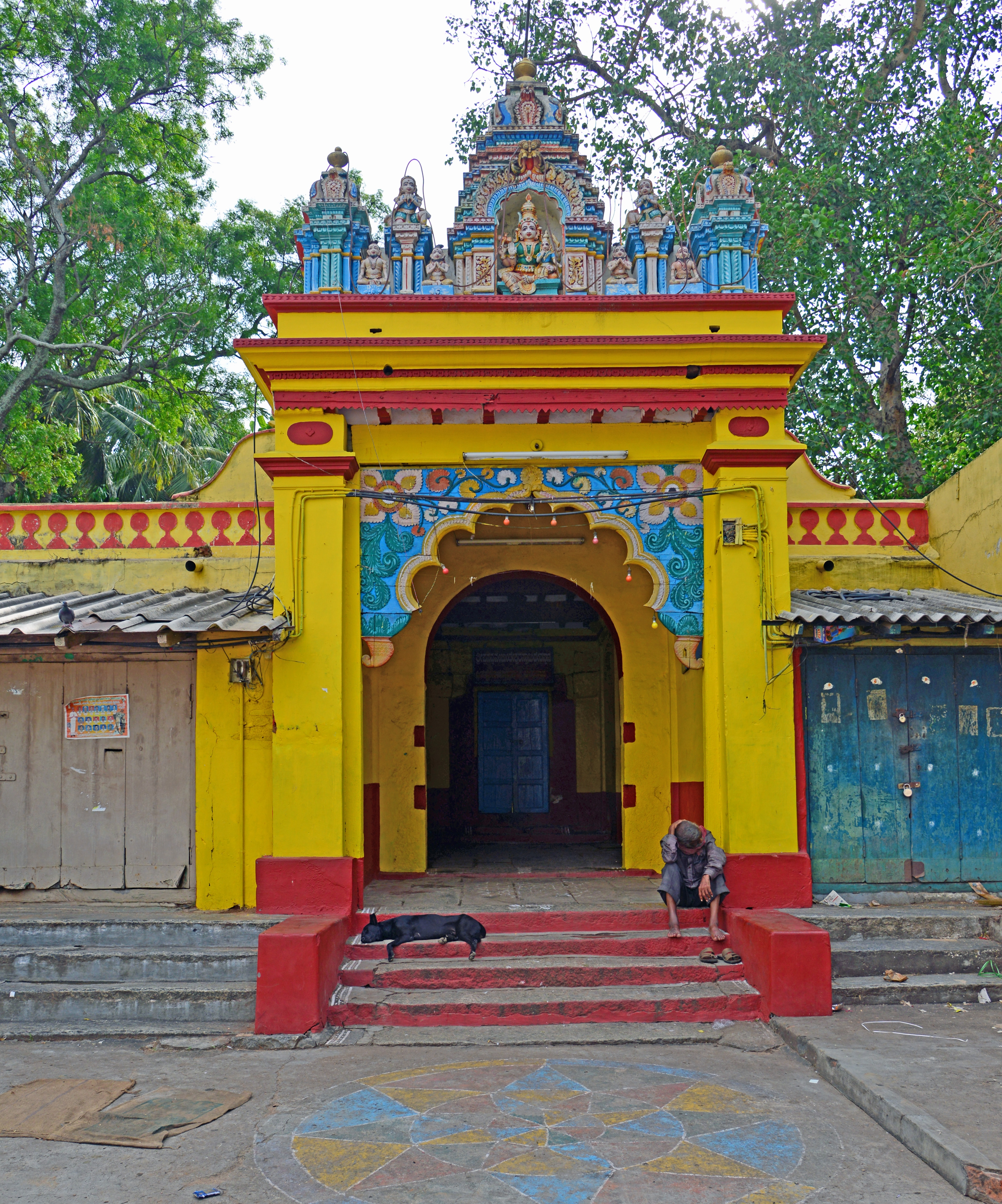
Nanjundeswara Temple

Many tourists visit the Kollegala area. The Male Mahadeshwara Hills, and the waterfalls at Hogenakkal near Male Mahadeshwara hills and the waterfalls of Gagana Chukki and Barachukki at Shivanasamudra (also known as Bluff) are popular destinations. In Kollegala, there is a small hill called "Maradi Gudda" which is located in the heart of the city. Gundal dam is just 15 km (9.3 mi) away from Kollegala. It also includes BRT Tiger Reserve (2011) Biligiriranga Hills which is approximately 25–30 km from the town, which is a home to many fauna and flora including mammals like Tigers, Leopards, Indian Elephant, Indian Guar and the Sloth Bear.

== Transportation ==
Kollegala is connected by two national highways:

1. NH 948 (Bengaluru-Coimbatore Highway)
2. NH 766 this starts from Kollegala to Calicut, via Tirumakudalu Narasipura, Mysore and Gundlupet, Bandipur National Park, Sultan Bathery, Kalpetta

The nearest railway stations are Chamarajanagara 38 km (24 mi) and Mysuru (MYS) 60 km (37 mi). The nearest airport is Kempegowda International Airport (BLR), 150 km (93 mi), Mysore airport (MYQ), 60 km (37 mi)and Coimbatore International Airport (CJB), 165 km (103 mi) away. Kollegala

is the main junction where you can enter Salem, Coimbatore, Ooty, Kozhikode from Mysuru & Bengaluru. The Biligiri Rangana Betta (known as BR hills) is just 30 km (19 mi) away from the town. The K.Gudi (Kyathadevara Gudi) Wilderness camp run by the jungle lodges and resorts (a government of Karnataka undertaking) is near the B.R hills.

There are two bus routes from Bengaluru to Kollegala:

- Bengaluru > Maddur > Malavalli > Kollegala (Via NH 275) Bengaluru Mysuru highway, take left diversion at Maddur after 80 km from Bengaluru
- Bengaluru > Kanakapura > Halaguru > Malavalli > Kollegala (Via NH 209)

Karnataka government buses from Bengaluru ply from MCTC which is popularly known as Satellite bus terminal in Mysuru Road and also from Kalasipalyam. Since the town was in Coimbatore district in the past, buses run between Coimbatore and Kollegala.

== Geography ==
Kollegala is located at 12.15°N 77.12°E. It has an average elevation of 588 m (1,929 ft). Since the town is on the foothills of the Western Ghats, it is home to a mixed topography. Temperature is moderate.

Until 2018, Kollegala taluk was the largest taluk in Karnataka, in terms of area;2,800 square kilometres (1,100 mi^{2}). Then the Government of Karnataka carved out Hanur taluk from Kollegala, significantly reducing its size.

== Demographics ==
As of 2011 India census Kollegala had a population of 57,149. Males constitute 51% of the population and females 49%. Kollegala has an average literacy rate of 69%, higher than the national average of 59.5%: male literacy is 74%, and female literacy is 64%. In Kollegala, 10% of the population is under 6 years of age.

People in Kollegala speak a variation of Kannada distinct from that spoken in Mysuru and Bengaluru.

== College and schools ==
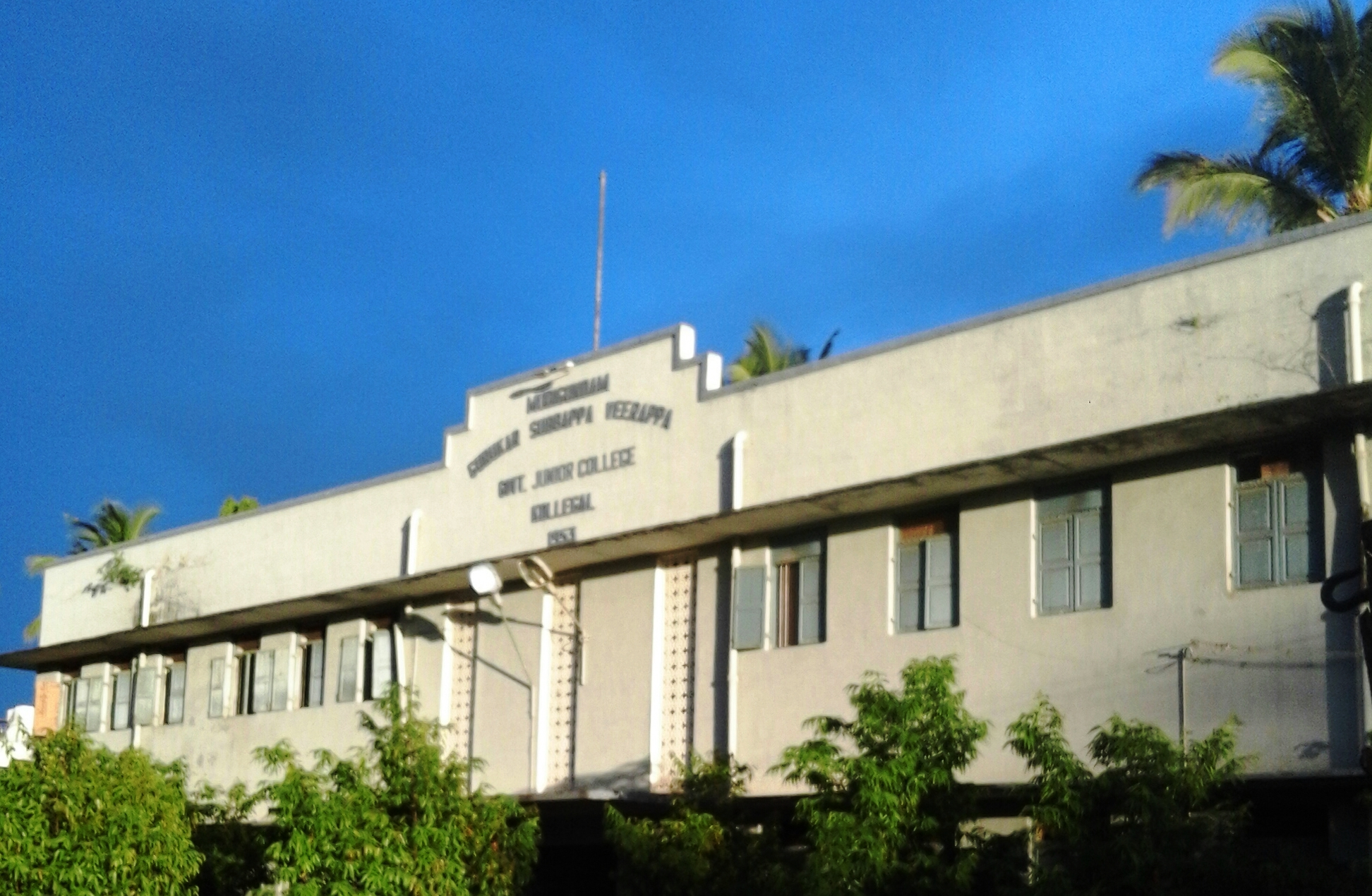
MGSV Junior College, Kollegala

MCKC High School, Lions School and PU college, Seventh Day Adventist English school, St. Francis Assisi School and PU college, RC mission, Sree Vasavi Vidya Kendra, Mahadeshwara College, JSS Women's College And College For Nursing are the oldest educational institutions in Kollegal offering best education. Manasa degree college and school and its PU college is a decade old private institution. Wisdom school is a recently opened private institution.While Bird memorial High school is the oldest English school still giving quality education to poor children.

== Image gallery ==
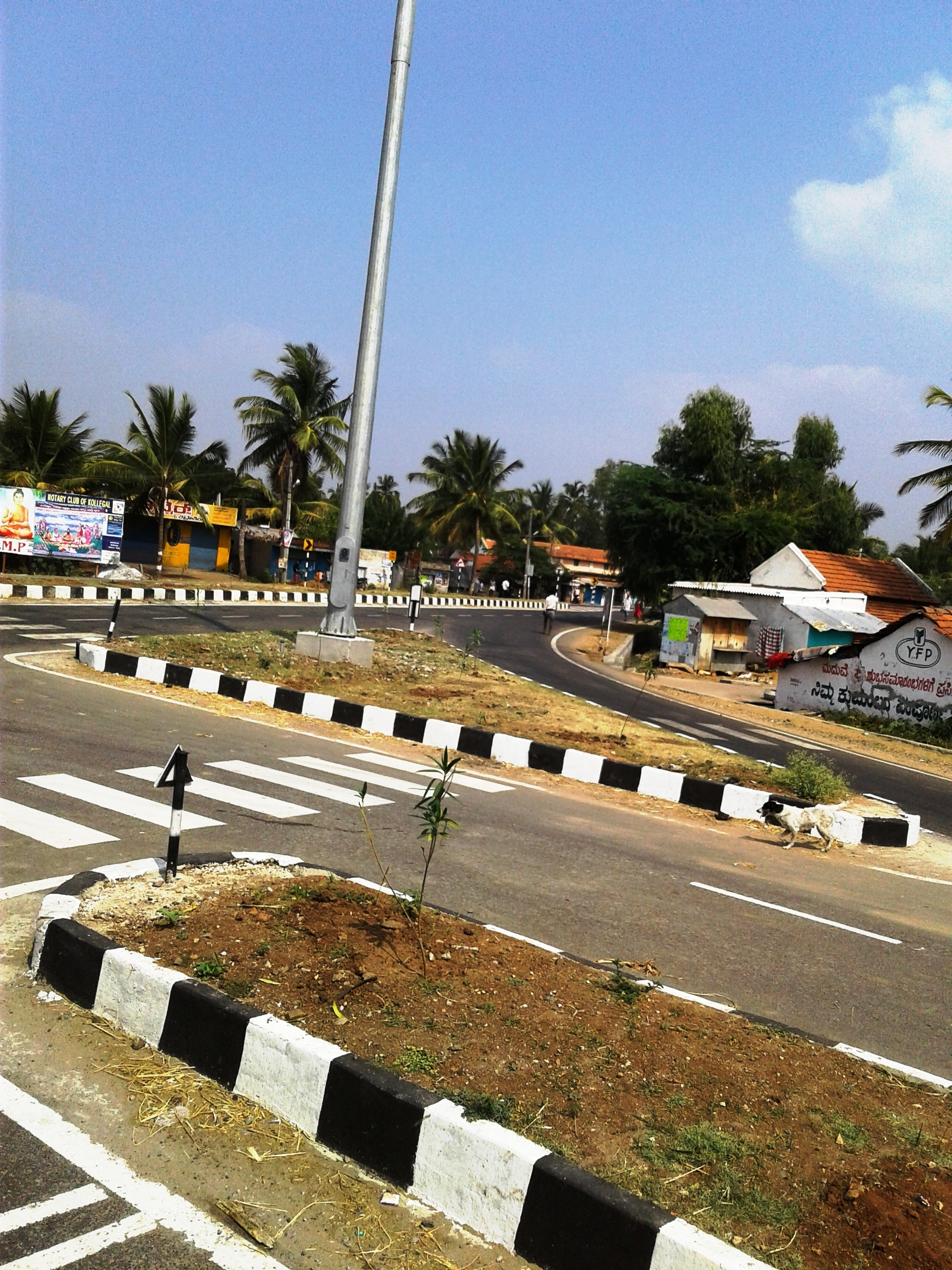
Uttamballi Junction which connects NH 209 and NH 212

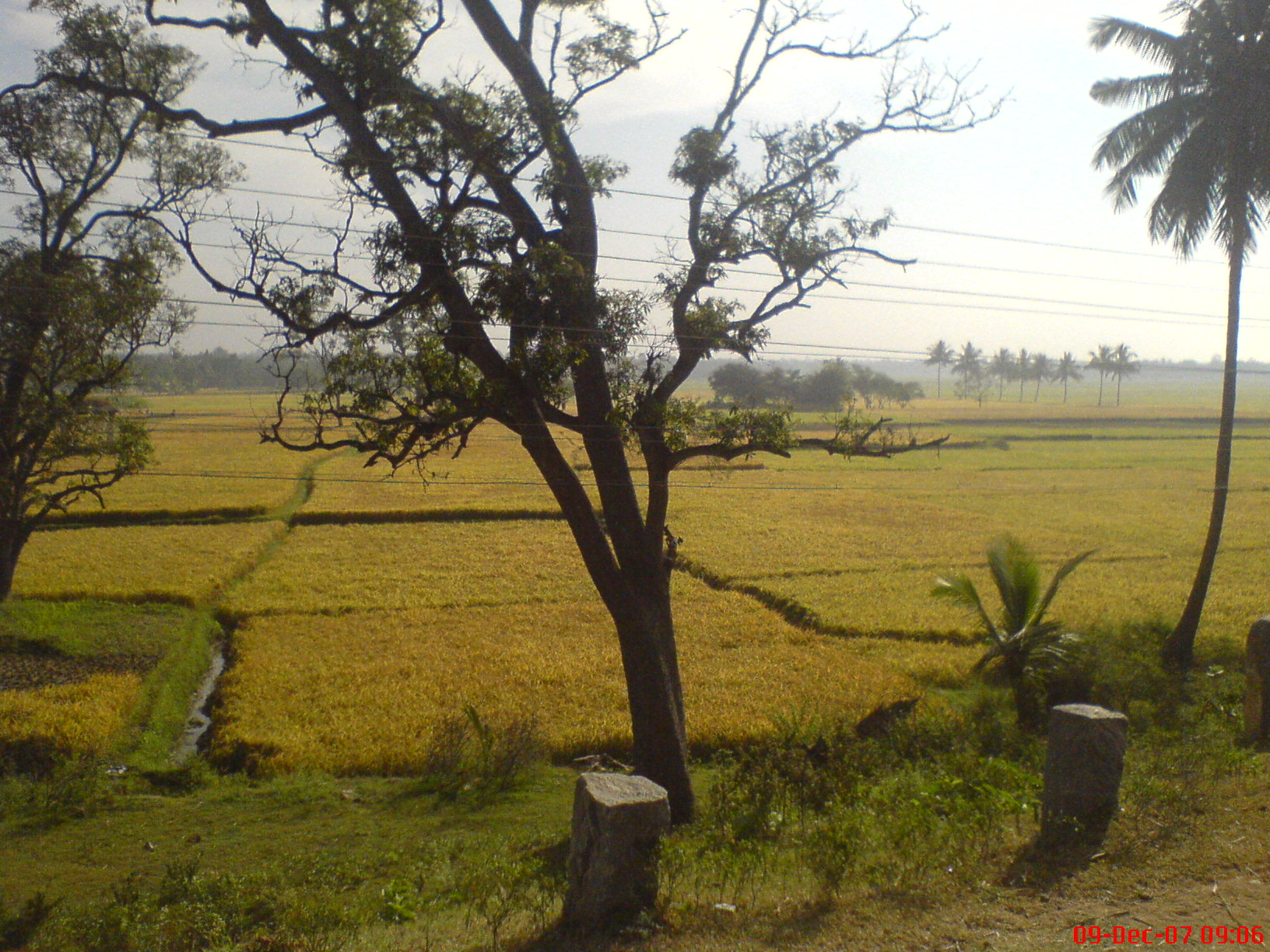
Paddy fields-Ripe for harvest

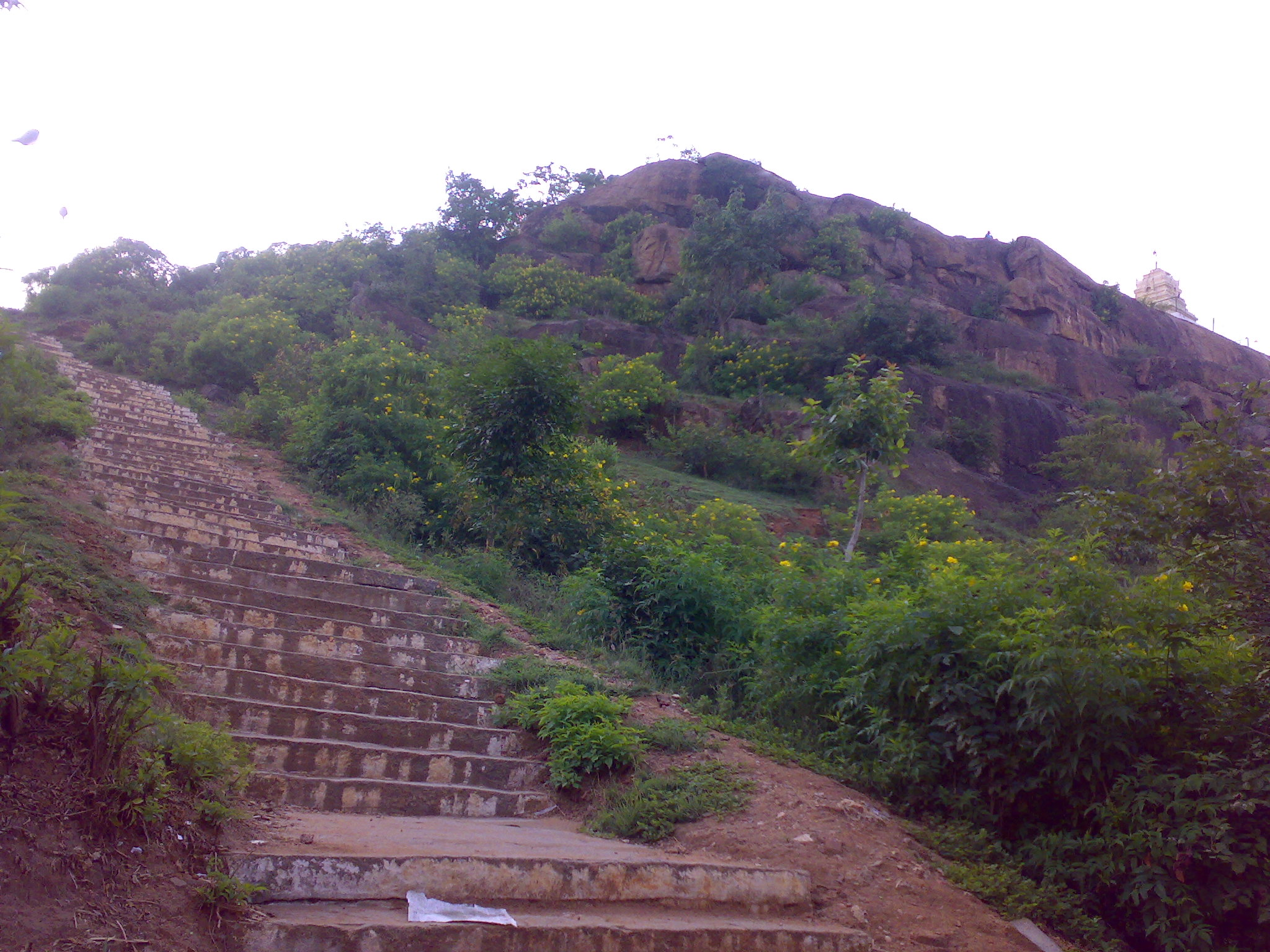
Maradi Gudda Hill Steps

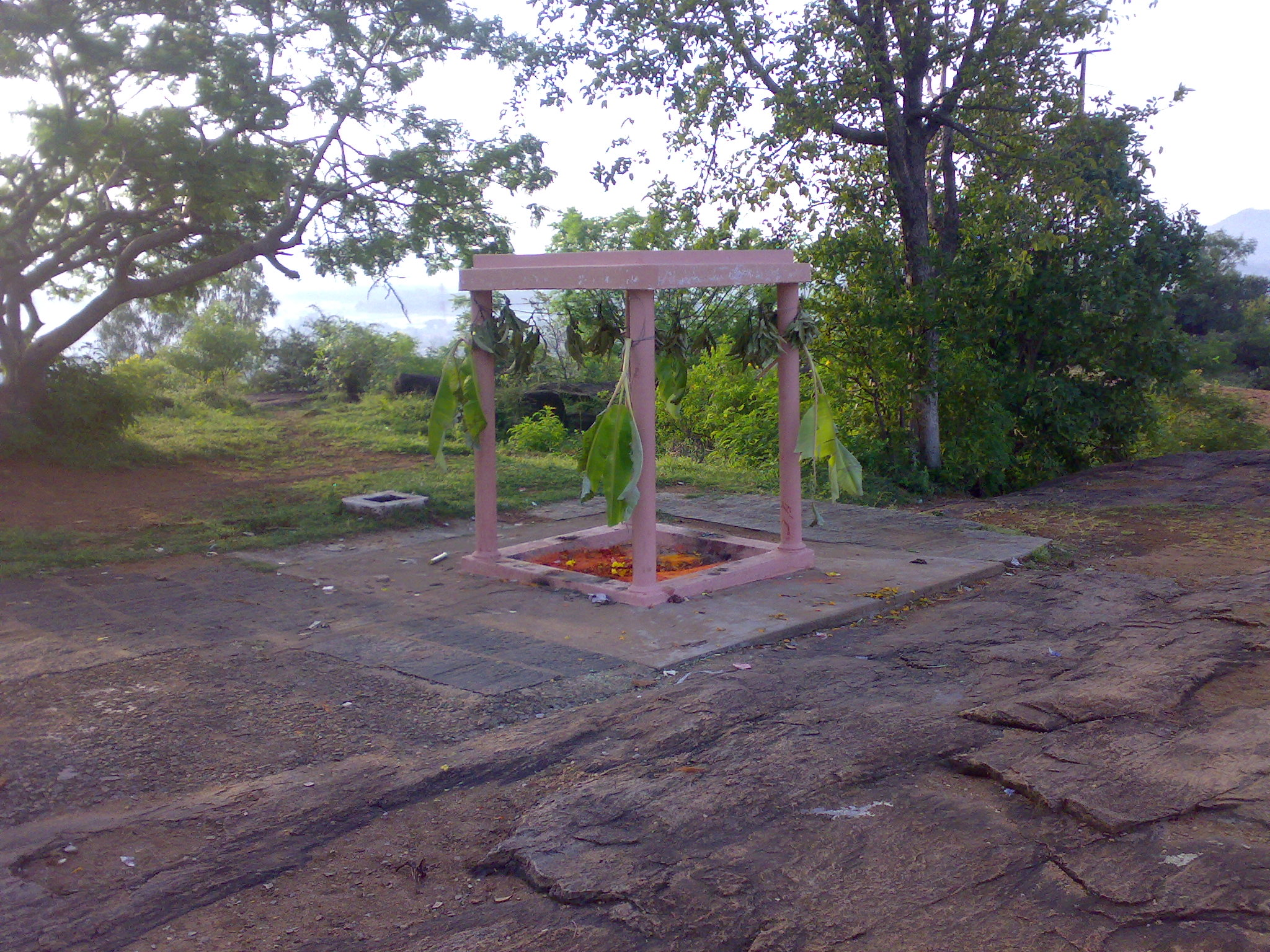
Sri Mahadeshwara Swamy First Foot Prints

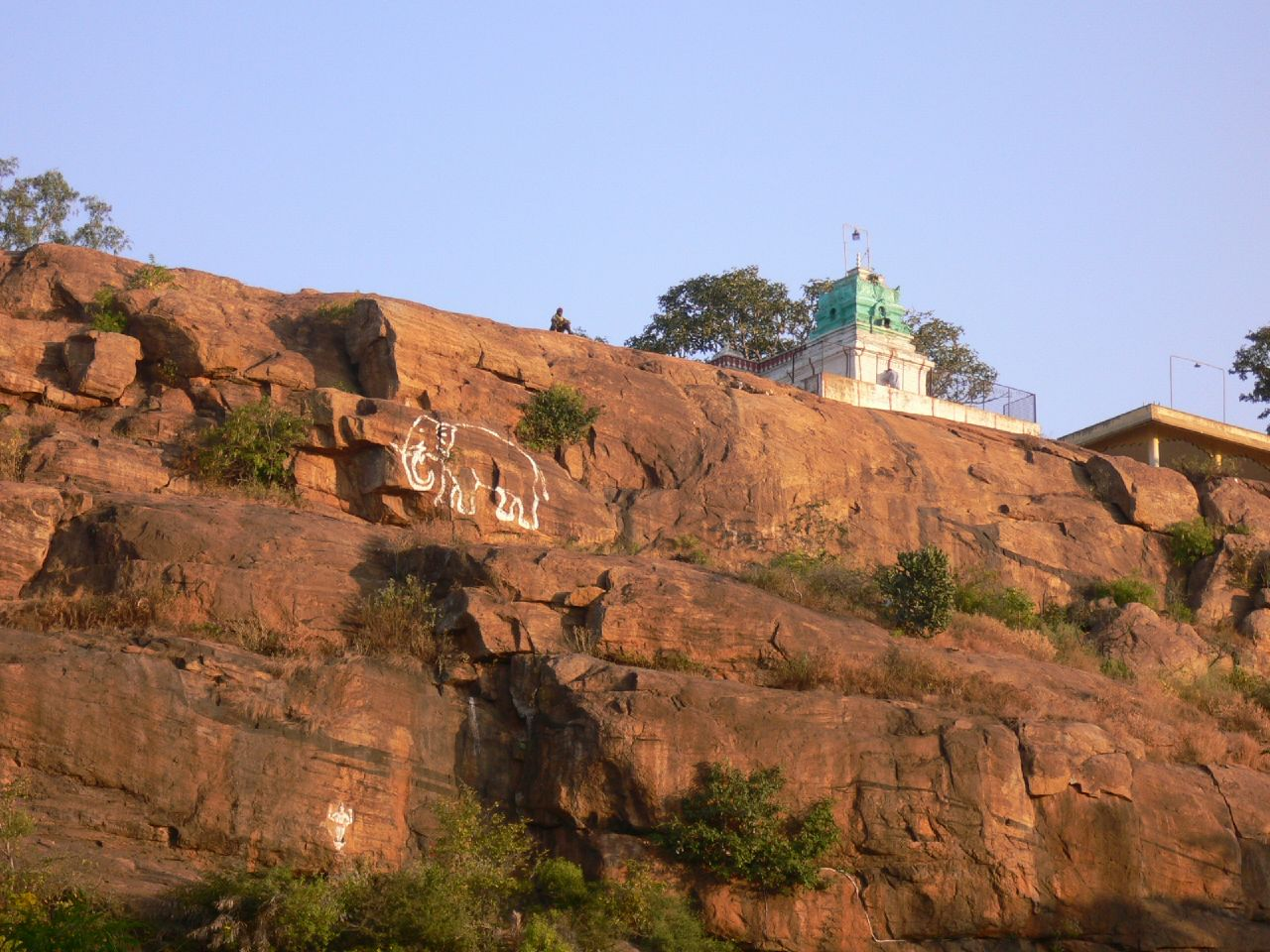
Maradi Gudda Hills

== See also ==
- Hanur
- Male Mahadeshwara Hills
- Yelandur
- Chamarajanagara
