= Chamarajanagar =

- City
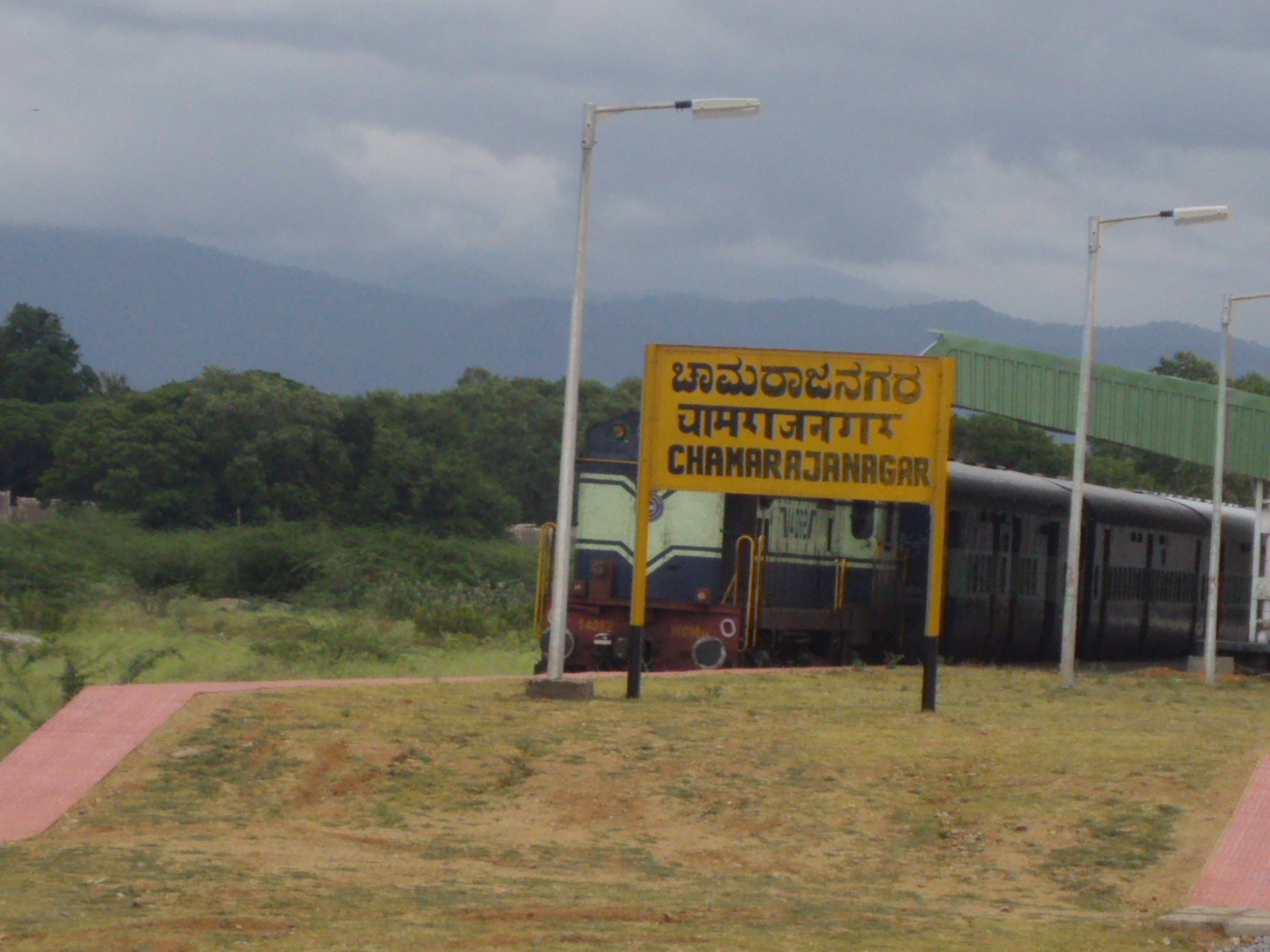
- Chamarajanagar Railway Station
- Interactive map of Chamarajanagar
- Coordinates: 11.9260°N 76.9402°E
- Country: India
- State: Karnataka
- District: Chamarajanagar
- Named for: Chamaraja Wodeyar IX

Government
  - Body: Municipal Council

Area
  - City: 18.75 km^{2} (7.24 sq mi)
  - Rural: 1,210 km^{2} (470 sq mi)
- Elevation: 720 m (2,360 ft)

Population (2011)
  - City: 69,875
  - Density: 3,727/km^{2} (9,652/sq mi)
  - Rural: 287,924
- Time zone: UTC+5:30 (IST)
- PIN: 571 313
- Telephone code: +91(0)8226
- Vehicle registration: KA-10
- Official language: Kannada
- Website: chamarajanagaracity.mrc.gov.in

Chamarajanagara is a city and headquarter of eponymous Chamarajanagar district in the Karnataka state of India. It is named after Chamaraja Wodeyar IX, the erstwhile Raja of Mysore, Chamarajanagara was previously known as 'Arikottara'.

== History ==
While the area was previously known as 'Sri Arikottara', the area was later named after Chamaraja Wodeyar, the Wodeyar of Mysore who was born here. The Vijaya Parsvanath Basadi, a holy jain shrine was constructed by Punisadandanayaka, the commander of the Hoysala king Gangaraja in the year 1117 AD.

== Geography and climate ==
Chamarajnagar is located at 11.92°N 76.95°E. It has an average elevation of 720 metres (2,360 ft).

It was ranked among the top 10 Indian cities with the cleanest air and best AQI in 2024.

== Demographics ==
As of the 2011 census, Chamrajanagar had a population of 69875. Males constituted 51% of the population and females 49%. Chamrajanagar has an average literacy rate of 60%, higher than the national average of 59.5%; with male literacy of 65% and female literacy of 54%. 12% of the population is under six years of age.

== Transport ==
National Highway 150A (India) originating from Jevargi, terminates at Chamarajanagara. Another national highway NH-948 connecting Bangalore to Coimbatore passes through the town. State Highway 80 (Karnataka) and State Highway 81 (Karnataka) are the other two major highways connecting the town. The RTO Code of Chamarajanagar is KA10.

Chamarajanagar railway station is the southernmost rail point in Karnataka. There is a direct train to Tirupati which starts at three in the afternoon and a direct train to Bangalore in the morning. The nearest airport is Mysore airport.

== Religion ==
Maaravva or Maaramma is the most widely worshiped deity in the town, more than ten temples of Maaravva can be found in the town. Chamarajeshwara Temple and Haralu Kote Anjaneya Temple are the biggest and the oldest temples respectively. Apart from these, the town has many temples. As far as other religious beliefs are concerned, the town has two Jain Basadis and two Buddha Viharas.

== Bandit Veerappan ==
Since a lot of the southern area of the district is dense forest, it had provided a good refuge to the notorious bandit Veerappan, responsible for the death of over a hundred policemen. He was shot dead in an encounter with the specially formed Special Task Force (STF) on 18 October 2004 in Dharmapuri district, Tamil Nadu. He had been on the run for over two decades.

The presence of illegal quarrying for black stone imposes a threat to the forests in the region.

== Image gallery ==
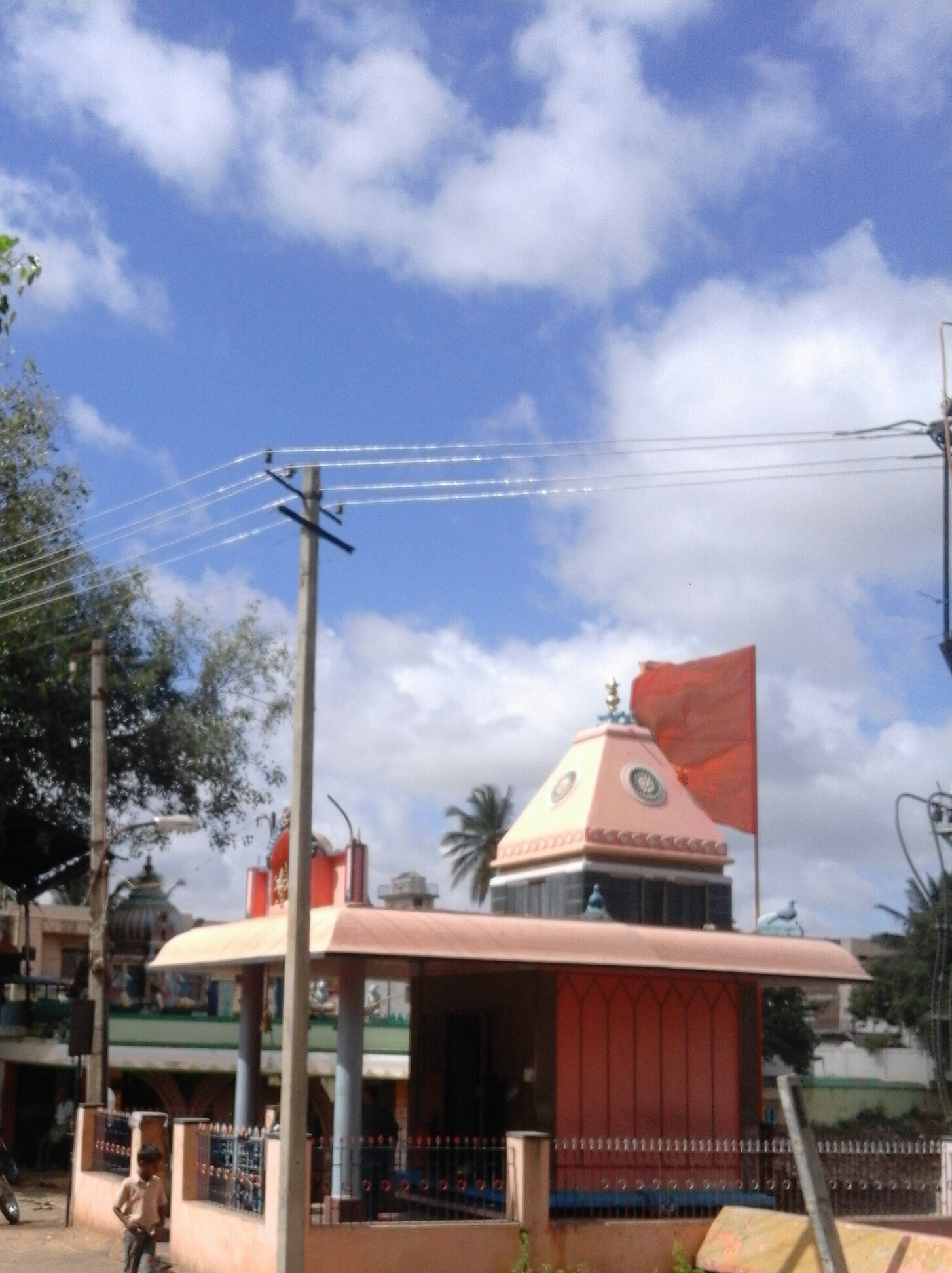
Ayyappa Temple

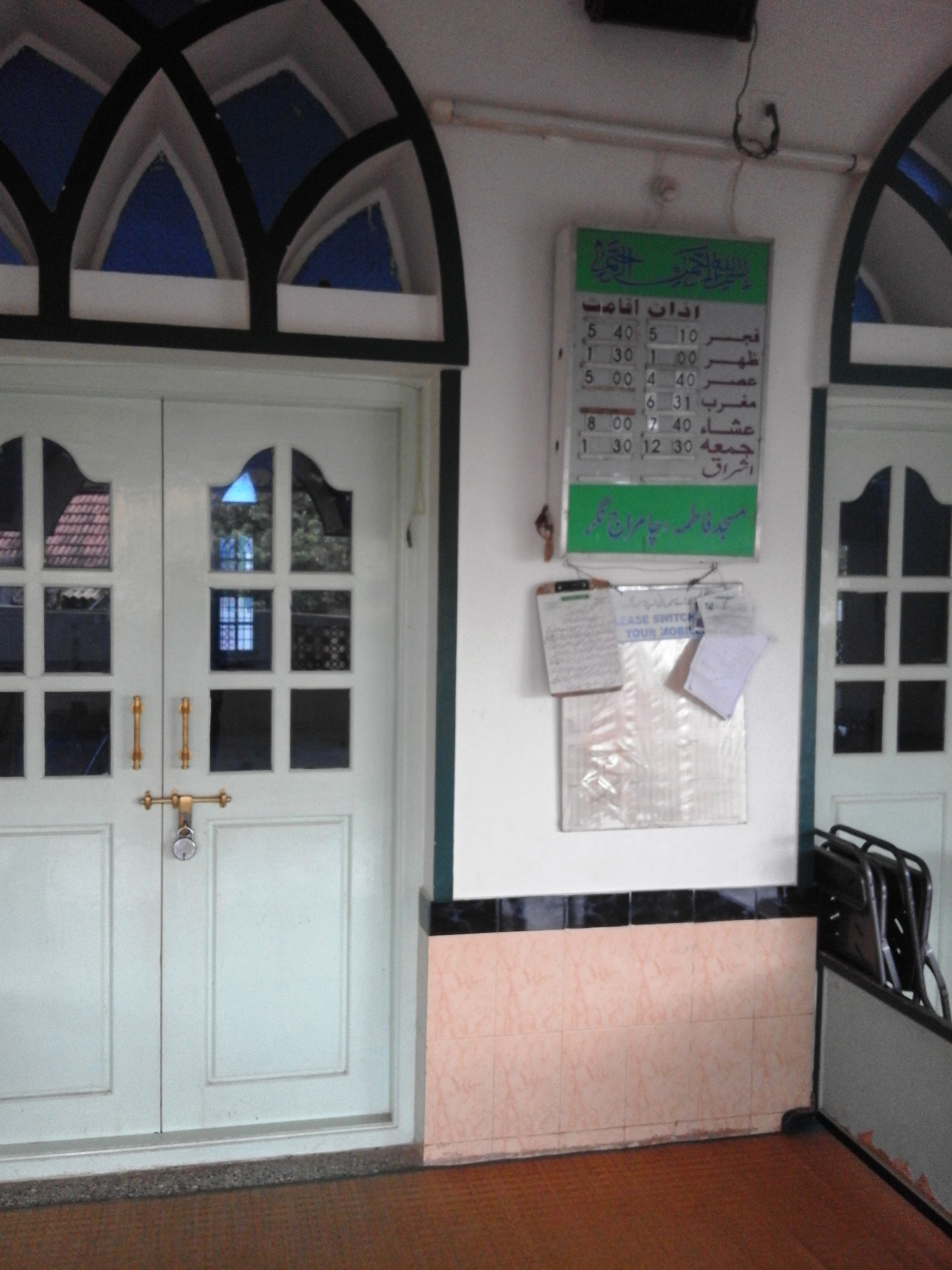
Fathima Mosque

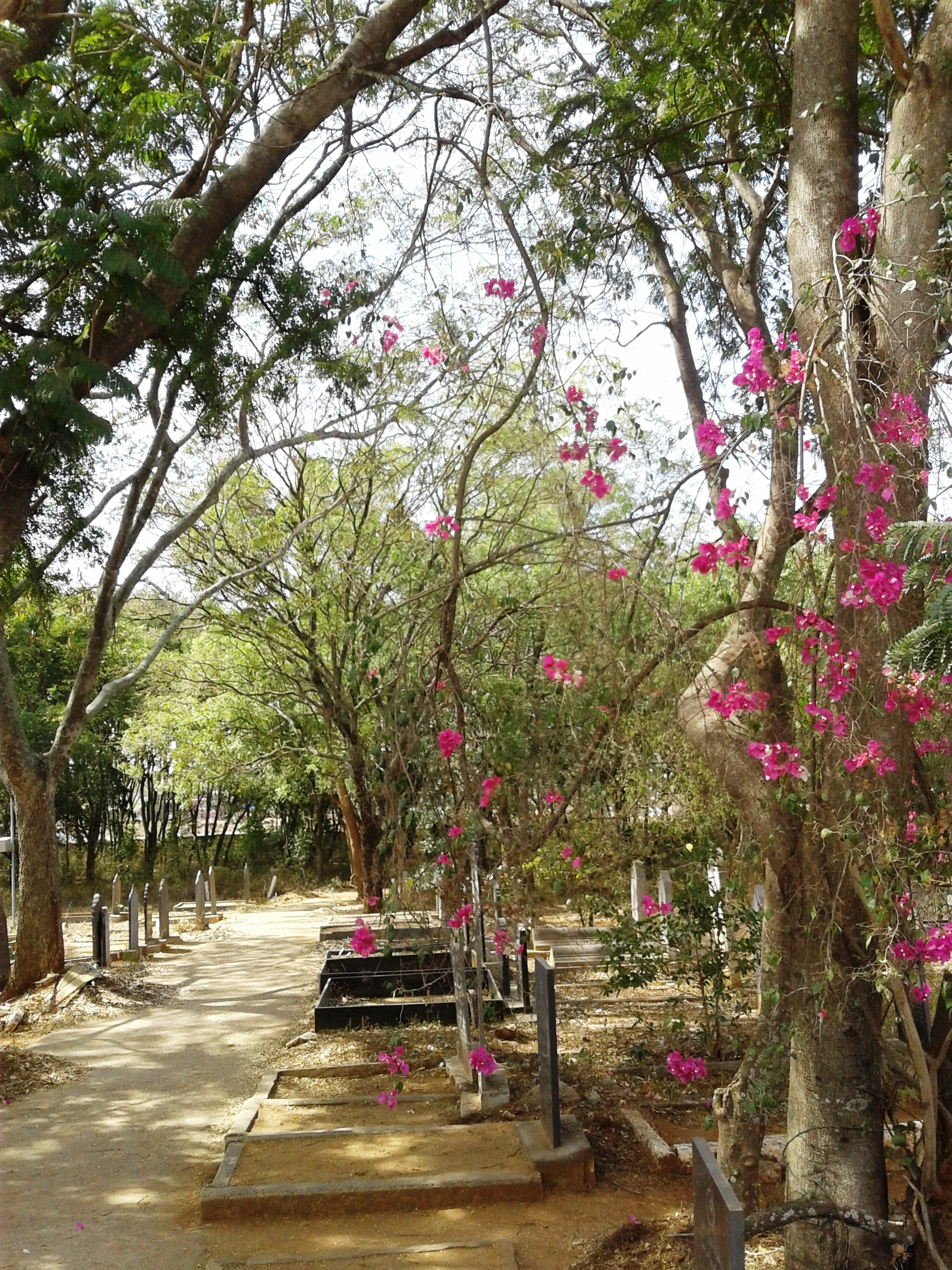
Muslim Cemetery

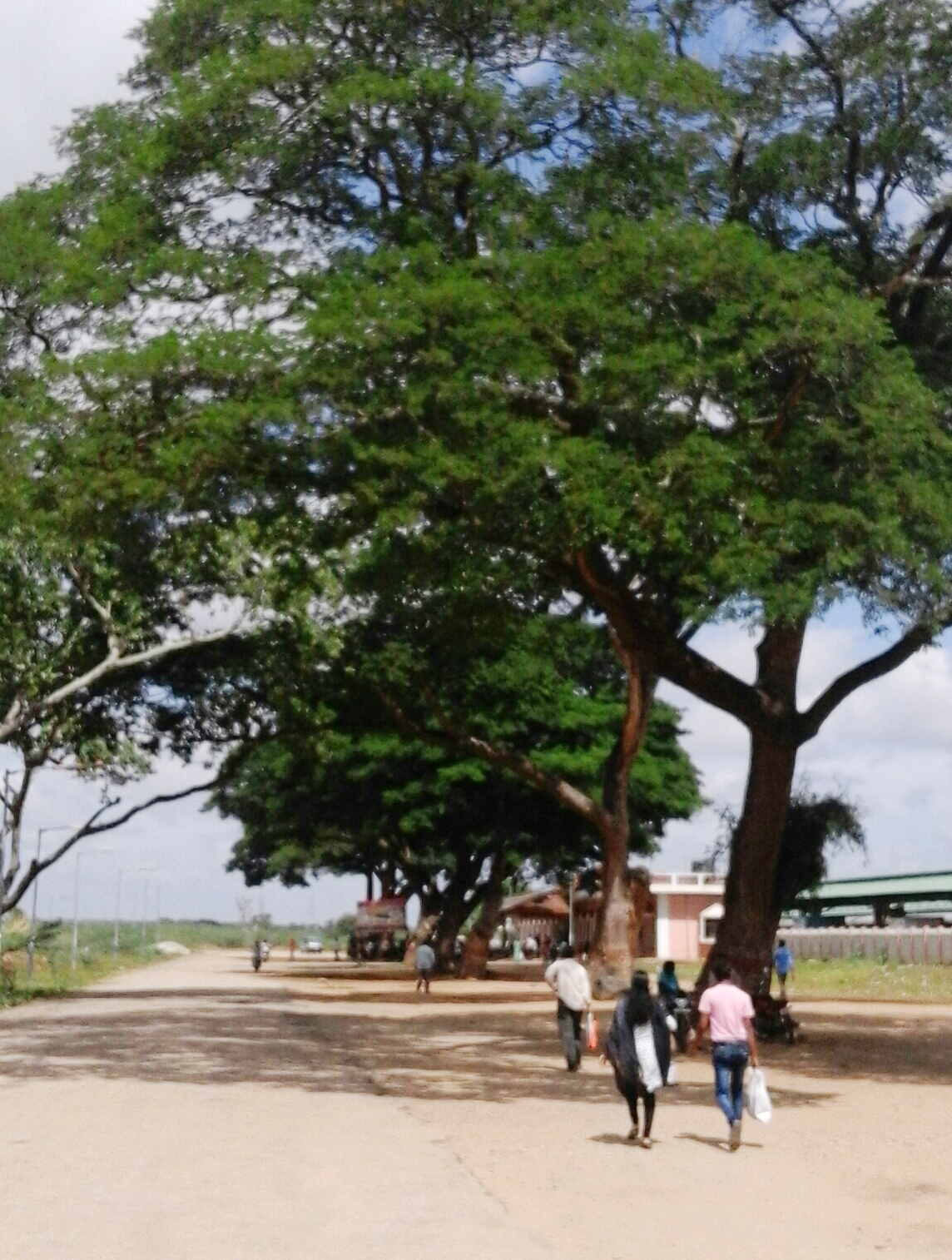
Chamarajanagar Railway Station

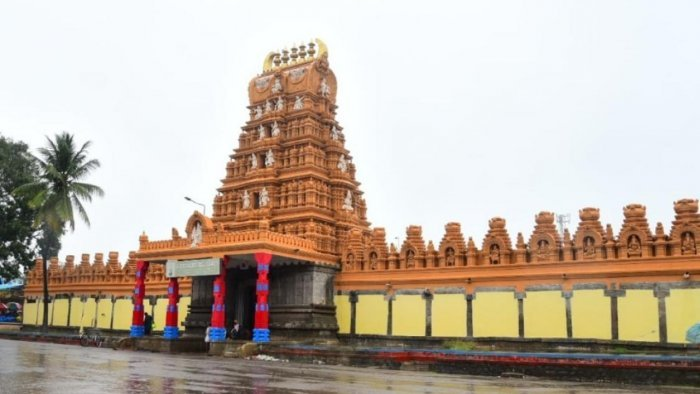
Chamarajeshwara temple

== See also ==
- Kollegal
- Yelandur
- Gundlupet
- Male Mahadeshwara Hills
- Biligiriranga Hills
- Bandipur National Park
- Chinnada Gudi Hundi
- Badana Guppe
- Mariyala-Gangavadi Halt
- Mukkadahalli
- Mysore–Chamarajanagar branch line
- Kellamballi
- Rechamballi
- Kagalvadi
- Irasavadi
- Badanaguppe
- Mariyala
- Bandalli
