= A. R. Krishnamurthy =

Indian National Congress politician

Member of Karnataka Legislative Assembly
- Incumbent
- Assumed office 2023
- Preceded by: N. Mahesh
- Constituency: Kollegal
- In office 1994–2004
- Constituency: Santhemarahalli

Personal details
- Born: 23 March 1961 (age 65)
- Party: Indian National Congress

A. R. Krishnamurthy is an Indian National Congress politician hailing from the state of Karnataka. He is a current member of Karnataka Legislative Assembly for Kollegal, Karnataka. Krishnamurthy is the former chairman of the Ambedkar Development Co-operative and also operates a petrol station.

== Career ==
A.R. Krishnamurthy had achieved electoral victories in 1994 and 1999 in Santhemarah.

In 2004, he lost the Assembly polls in the former Santhemarahalli Assembly constituency by just one vote. However, he has now achieved a victory by securing a win in the Kollegal during 2023 Karnataka Legislative Assembly elections. Krishnamurthy obtained 1,08,363 votes, defeating his opponent, N. Mahesh of the BJP, who received 48,844 votes. He won by a margin of over 59,000 votes.

== Positions held ==
- 2023: Elected to Karnataka Legislative Assembly

=== 2004 election result ===
2004 Karnataka Legislative Assembly election: Santhemarahalli
Party	Candidate	Votes	%	±%
INC	R. Dhruvanarayana	40,752	42.77	
JD(S)	A. R. Krishnamurthy	40,751	42.77	
BSP	Krishna Murthy C. M.	5,742	6.03	
BJP	Hemavathi S	5,977	3.58	
JP	Krishna Murthy M. S.	2,063	2.5	
Kannada Nadu Party	Mahadevaiah P.	2,091	2.19	
Majority		1	0.00001	
Turnout		95,277	72.19	
INC gain from JD(U)		Swing		
