= Kollegal Assembly constituency =

Legislative Assembly constituency in Karnataka State, India

Coordinates: 12.16°N 77.11°E

Kollegal
- Constituency No. 222 for the Karnataka Legislative Assembly

Constituency details
- Country: India
- Region: South India
- State: Karnataka
- Division: Mysore
- District: Chamarajanagar
- Lok Sabha constituency: Chamarajanagar
- Established: 1951
- Total electors: 216,643
- Reservation: SC

Member of Legislative Assembly
- 16th Karnataka Legislative Assembly
- Incumbent A. R. Krishnamurthy
- Party: Indian National Congress
- Elected year: 2023
- Preceded by: N. Mahesh

Kollegal Assembly constituency is one of the 224 Legislative Assembly constituencies of Karnataka in India. It is part of Chamarajanagar district, and is reserved for candidates belonging to the Scheduled Castes. It encompasses Yelandur taluk, parts of Kollegal taluk and Chamarajanagar taluk.

As of 2023, its representative is A. R. Krishnamurthy of the Indian National Congress party.

== Members of the Legislative Assembly ==
Election	Member	Party
1952	S. C. Virupakshiah	Indian National Congress
1957	T. P. Boraiah	Indian National Congress
1957	Kempamma	Indian National Congress
1962	B. Basavaiah	Indian National Congress
1967	B. Basavaiah	Indian National Congress
1972	M. Siddamadaiah	Indian National Congress
1978	M. Siddamadaiah	Indian National Congress
1983	B. Basavaiah	Janata Party
1985	B. Basavaiah	Janata Party
1989	M. Siddamadaiah	Indian National Congress
1994	S. Jayanna	Janata Dal
1999	G. N. Nanjunda Swamy	Indian National Congress
2004	S. Balaraj	Independent politician
2008	R. Dhruvanarayana	Indian National Congress
2009 By-election	G. N. Nanjunda Swamy	Bharatiya Janata Party
2013	S. Jayanna	Indian National Congress
2018	N. Mahesh	Bahujan Samaj Party
2023	A. R. Krishnamurthy	Indian National Congress

== Election results ==
=== Assembly Election 2023 ===
2023 Karnataka Legislative Assembly election : Kollegal
Party	Candidate	Votes	%	±%
INC	A. R. Krishnamurthy	108,363	64.59	▲33.60
BJP	N. Mahesh	48,844	29.11	▲5.61
JD(S)	B. Puttaswamy	3,925	2.34	New
NOTA	None of the above	1,671	1.00	▲0.10
Independent	B. Rachaiah Kinakahalli	1,519	0.91	New
UPP	V. Vinay Kumar	1,022	0.61	New
Margin of victory		59,519	35.47	▲23.95
Turnout		168,118	77.60	▼2.28
Total valid votes		167,779		
Registered electors		216,643		▲2.41
INC gain from BSP		Swing	▲22.08	

=== Assembly Election 2018 ===
2018 Karnataka Legislative Assembly election : Kollegal
Party	Candidate	Votes	%	±%
BSP	N. Mahesh	71,792	42.51	▲19.59
INC	A. R. Krishnamurthy	52,338	30.99	▲1.79
BJP	G. N. Nanjunda Swamy	39,690	23.50	▲12.89
RPI(A)	Chikkasavaka. S	1,591	0.94	New
NOTA	None of the above	1,524	0.90	New
Margin of victory		19,454	11.52	▲5.24
Turnout		168,987	79.88	▲3.41
Total valid votes		168,871		
Registered electors		211,555		▲10.42
BSP gain from INC		Swing	▲13.31	

=== Assembly Election 2013 ===
2013 Karnataka Legislative Assembly election : Kollegal
Party	Candidate	Votes	%	±%
INC	S. Jayanna	47,402	29.20	▼1.72
BSP	N. Mahesh	37,209	22.92	▲7.09
KJP	S. Balaraj	32,929	20.29	New
BJP	G. N. Nanjunda Swamy	17,224	10.61	▼26.50
JD(S)	N. Chamaraju	4,392	2.71	▼9.70
Independent	Suresh Kumar	3,896	2.40	New
Independent	P. Balaraju	1,000	0.62	New
Margin of victory		10,193	6.28	▲0.09
Turnout		146,509	76.47	▲3.52
Total valid votes		162,326		
Registered electors		191,585		▲4.66
INC gain from BJP		Swing	▼7.91	

=== Assembly By-election 2009 ===
2009 Karnataka Legislative Assembly by-election : Kollegal
Party	Candidate	Votes	%	±%
BJP	G. N. N. Swamy	49,553	37.11	▲17.45
INC	S. Jayanna	41,286	30.92	▲2.20
BSP	Dr. Subash Bharani	21,143	15.83	▼3.76
JD(S)	S. Balaraj	16,572	12.41	▼7.02
Independent	Subbaiah	1,552	1.16	New
Margin of victory		8,267	6.19	▼2.87
Turnout		133,524	72.95	▲0.58
Total valid votes		133,524		
Registered electors		183,046		▲1.59
BJP gain from INC		Swing	▲8.39	

=== Assembly Election 2008 ===
2008 Karnataka Legislative Assembly election : Kollegal
Party	Candidate	Votes	%	±%
INC	R. Dhruvanarayana	37,384	28.72	▲8.34
BJP	S. Mahendar	25,586	19.66	New
BSP	N. Mahesh	25,505	19.59	▲0.97
JD(S)	A. R. Krishnamurthy	25,286	19.43	▼4.39
Independent	S. Balaraj	11,805	9.07	New
SKP	M. Basavaraju	1,850	1.42	New
Independent	M. Nanjaiah	1,166	0.90	New
SP	Kandahalli Narayana	860	0.66	New
Margin of victory		11,798	9.06	▲5.81
Turnout		130,401	72.37	▲3.24
Total valid votes		130,170		
Registered electors		180,177		▲21.47
INC gain from Independent		Swing	▲1.65	

=== Assembly Election 2004 ===
2004 Karnataka Legislative Assembly election : Kollegal
Party	Candidate	Votes	%	±%
Independent	S. Balaraj	27,736	27.07	New
JD(S)	S. Jayanna	24,408	23.82	▲11.19
INC	G. N. Nanjunda Swamy	20,884	20.38	▼14.86
BSP	N. Mahesh	19,075	18.62	▲12.41
JD(U)	Sarvesh. K. B	2,803	2.74	▼9.86
KRRS	M. Basavaraju	2,786	2.72	New
JP	Mukunda Varma. T	2,116	2.07	New
Urs Samyuktha Paksha	Govindaraju. R	1,444	1.41	New
Kannada Nadu Party	Mallikarjuna	1,215	1.19	New
Margin of victory		3,328	3.25	▼3.19
Turnout		102,533	69.13	▲1.05
Total valid votes		102,467		
Registered electors		148,327		▲9.43
Independent gain from INC		Swing	▼8.17	

=== Assembly Election 1999 ===
1999 Karnataka Legislative Assembly election : Kollegal
Party	Candidate	Votes	%	±%
INC	G. N. Nanjunda Swamy	29,671	35.24	▲23.15
BJP	S. Balaraj	24,250	28.80	▲12.20
JD(S)	S. Jayanna	10,636	12.63	New
JD(U)	D. Siddaraju	10,610	12.60	New
BSP	N. Shivamallu	5,229	6.21	New
Independent	Narayana	1,748	2.08	New
Independent	B. Chickka Siddaiah	1,326	1.57	New
Kannada Chalavali Vatal Paksha	Vijayakumari	726	0.86	New
Margin of victory		5,421	6.44	▼23.93
Turnout		92,283	68.08	▲0.69
Total valid votes		84,196		
Rejected ballots		7,903	8.56	▲5.88
Registered electors		135,550		▲5.53
INC gain from JD		Swing	▼11.73	

=== Assembly Election 1994 ===
1994 Karnataka Legislative Assembly election : Kollegal
Party	Candidate	Votes	%	±%
JD	S. Jayanna	39,568	46.97	▲16.33
BJP	G. N. Nanjunda Swamy	13,988	16.60	New
Kranti Sabha	M. Basavaraju	12,637	15.00	New
INC	Kempamma	10,185	12.09	▼51.04
INC	S. Yathiraj	6,570	7.80	New
JP	R. Siddabasavaiah	669	0.79	New
Margin of victory		25,580	30.37	▼2.12
Turnout		86,561	67.39	▼1.88
Total valid votes		84,241		
Rejected ballots		2,320	2.68	▼3.40
Registered electors		128,451		▲12.25
JD gain from INC		Swing	▼16.16	

=== Assembly Election 1989 ===
1989 Karnataka Legislative Assembly election : Kollegal
Party	Candidate	Votes	%	±%
INC	M. Siddamadaiah	46,998	63.13	▲18.50
JD	B. Basavaiah	22,810	30.64	New
JP	N. Lingaraju	2,817	3.78	New
Independent	Ningaraju	881	1.18	New
Independent	Muddaiah	512	0.69	New
Margin of victory		24,188	32.49	▲30.58
Turnout		79,266	69.27	▲4.97
Total valid votes		74,445		
Rejected ballots		4,821	6.08	▲3.78
Registered electors		114,434		▲23.22
INC gain from JP		Swing	▲16.60	

=== Assembly Election 1985 ===
1985 Karnataka Legislative Assembly election : Kollegal
Party	Candidate	Votes	%	±%
JP	B. Basavaiah	27,149	46.53	▼4.87
INC	M. Siddamadaiah	26,037	44.63	▲10.75
LKD	M. A. Sureshkumar	2,960	5.07	▼1.76
BJP	Chikkaveeraiah	1,324	2.27	▼1.18
Independent	K. N. Nanjundaiah	706	1.21	New
Margin of victory		1,112	1.91	▼15.60
Turnout		59,715	64.30	▼0.53
Total valid votes		58,343		
Rejected ballots		1,372	2.30	▼0.45
Registered electors		92,867		▲5.65
JP hold		Swing	▼4.87	

=== Assembly Election 1983 ===
1983 Karnataka Legislative Assembly election : Kollegal
Party	Candidate	Votes	%	±%
JP	B. Basavaiah	28,485	51.40	▲5.69
INC	K. Shivasankaraiah	18,779	33.88	▲31.63
LKD	L. Surendra	3,786	6.83	New
BJP	L. Lingaraju	1,912	3.45	New
Independent	M. Karugaiah	1,512	2.73	New
Independent	B. Nanjaiah	573	1.03	New
INC(J)	C. Devanna	373	0.67	New
Margin of victory		9,706	17.51	▲14.86
Turnout		56,986	64.83	▼10.17
Total valid votes		55,420		
Rejected ballots		1,566	2.75	▼0.19
Registered electors		87,898		▲9.77
JP gain from INC(I)		Swing	▲3.04	

=== Assembly Election 1978 ===
1978 Karnataka Legislative Assembly election : Kollegal
Party	Candidate	Votes	%	±%
INC(I)	M. Siddamadaiah	28,188	48.36	New
JP	B. Basavaiah	26,646	45.71	New
INC	Chakkabasavaiah. R	1,313	2.25	▼54.38
Independent	C. Devanna	960	1.65	New
Independent	Malleshu	857	1.47	New
Margin of victory		1,542	2.65	▼17.91
Turnout		60,054	75.00	▲20.78
Total valid votes		58,288		
Rejected ballots		1,766	2.94	▲2.94
Registered electors		80,073		▲10.39
INC(I) gain from INC		Swing	▼8.27	

=== Assembly Election 1972 ===
1972 Mysore State Legislative Assembly election : Kollegal
Party	Candidate	Votes	%	±%
INC	M. Siddamadaiah	21,455	56.63	▲5.61
INC(O)	R. Bharanaiah	13,667	36.07	New
ABJS	Shivashankar. N. Madaiah	2,764	7.30	New
Margin of victory		7,788	20.56	▲12.11
Turnout		39,325	54.22	▼0.31
Total valid votes		37,886		
Registered electors		72,535		▲9.52
INC hold		Swing	▲5.61	

=== Assembly Election 1967 ===
1967 Mysore State Legislative Assembly election : Kollegal
Party	Candidate	Votes	%	±%
INC	B. Basavaiah	16,893	51.02	▼9.02
Independent	M. Siddamadaiah	14,097	42.58	New
Independent	M. R. Rajarathnam	1,104	3.33	New
Independent	C. Devanna	1,014	3.06	New
Margin of victory		2,796	8.45	▼29.27
Turnout		36,113	54.53	▲9.10
Total valid votes		33,108		
Registered electors		66,232		▲33.22
INC hold		Swing	▼9.02	

=== Assembly Election 1962 ===
1962 Mysore State Legislative Assembly election : Kollegal
Party	Candidate	Votes	%	±%
INC	B. Basavaiah	12,721	60.04	▲4.61
PSP	M. Puttaswamy	4,729	22.32	▼12.74
CPI	C. Ranganathiah	1,554	7.33	New
Independent	B. Balliah	1,425	6.73	New
ABJS	Settiraju	514	2.43	New
Independent	D. Subbiah	245	1.16	New
Margin of victory		7,992	37.72	▲24.20
Turnout		22,588	45.43	▲1.70
Total valid votes		21,188		
Registered electors		49,715		▼49.19
INC hold		Swing	▲28.32	

=== Assembly Election 1957 ===
1957 Mysore State Legislative Assembly election : Kollegal
Party	Candidate	Votes	%	±%
INC	T. P. Boraiah	27,147	31.72	▼27.80
INC	Kempamma	20,286	23.71	▼35.81
PSP	K. P. Shantha Murthy	15,577	18.20	New
PSP	V. R. Puttaraju	14,424	16.86	New
Independent	N. Basavaraju	8,138	9.51	New
Margin of victory		11,570	13.52	▼5.52
Turnout		85,572	43.73	▼8.82
Total valid votes		85,572		
Registered electors		97,848		▲55.38
INC hold		Swing	▼27.80	

=== Assembly Election 1952 ===
1952 Madras State Legislative Assembly election : Kollegal
Party	Candidate	Votes	%	±%
INC	S. C. Virupakshiah	19,696	59.52	New
Independent	C. R. Subramani Iyer	13,395	40.48	New
Margin of victory		6,301	19.04	
Turnout		33,091	52.55	
Total valid votes		33,091		
Registered electors		62,972		
INC win (new seat)				

== See also ==
- List of constituencies of the Karnataka Legislative Assembly
- Chamarajanagar district
