= Gopalaswami =

Gopalaswami is a given name and surname. People with the name include:

- Gopalaswami Parthasarathy (diplomat)
- Gopalaswami Parthasarathy
- N. Gopalaswami
- Lakshmi Gopalaswami
- N. Gopalaswami Ayyangar

== See also ==
- Gopalaswami Hills
