= Rajyotsava Awards (2011) =

Awards given by the government of Karnataka, India

2011 Rajyotsava Awards
- Date: 1 November 2011
- Location: Bangalore, Karnataka
- Country: India
- Presented by: Government of Karnataka

The list of Karnataka Rajyotsava Award recipients for the year 2011 is below.

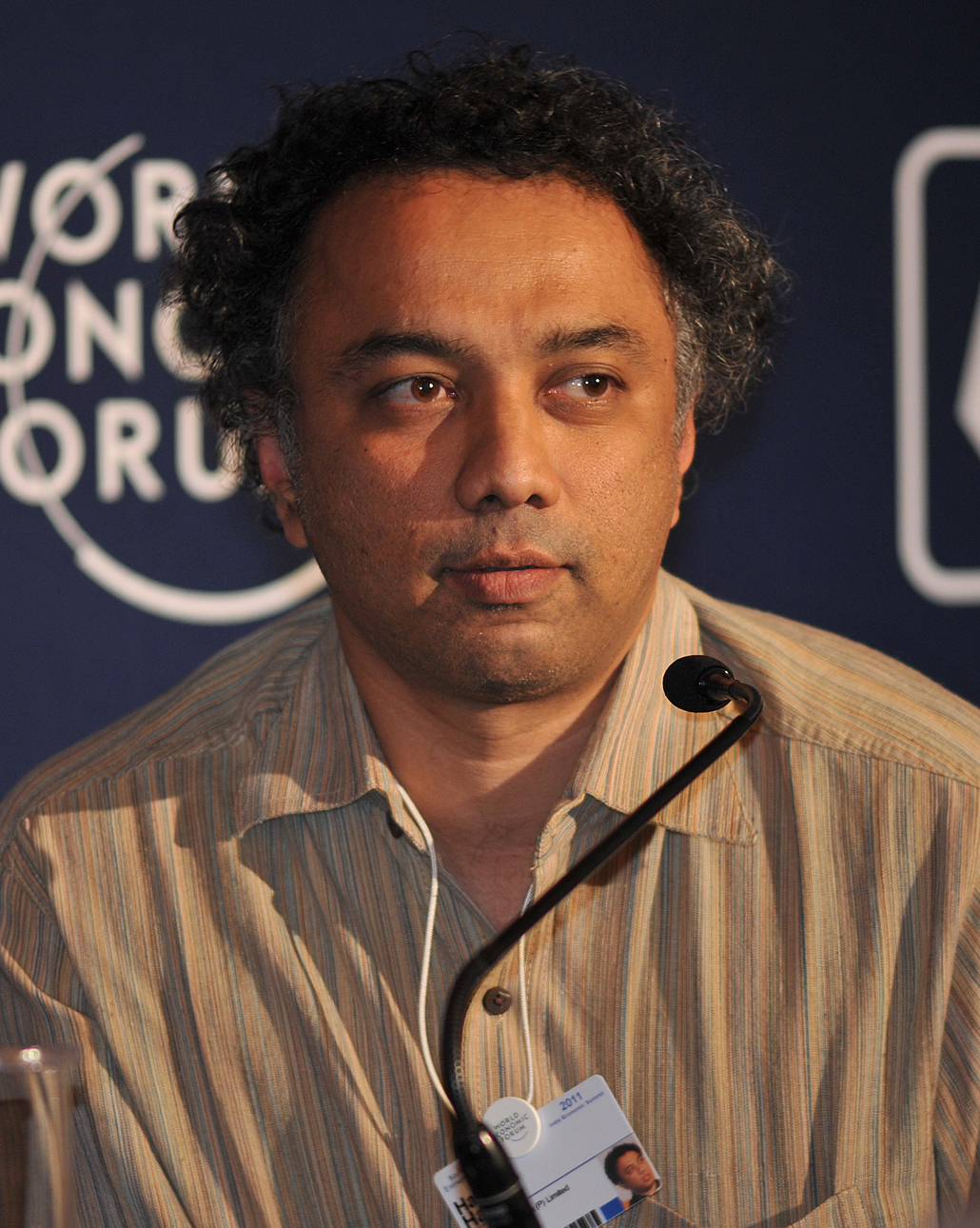
Harish Hande

Recipient	Field
Aravind Malagatti	Literature
Veeranna Dande	Literature
Mandeera Jaya Appanna	Literature
K. Nagaraj	Theatre
Renuka Durgappa Harijan Malapur	Theatre
Shantinath Dibbada	Research
K. S. Ambale Rajeshwari	Dance
H. Falguna	Music
Balachandra Nakoda	Music
Ganesh Puttur	Music
D. Shankar Binnal	Music
K. S. Vaishali	Music
Ramegowda	Folklore
Mahalingaiah B. Ganachari	Folklore
Virupakshappa Sudugadu Siddha	Folklore
Parvathevva Hongal	Folklore
Maheshwarappa Honnali	Folklore
Vithoba Hammanna Nayaka	Yakshagana
Kunjalu Ramakrishna Nayaka	Yakshagana
T. Anil Kumar	Photography
Nagaraj Veerabhadrappa Shilpi	Photography
Mohan Nagammanavar	Cultural Organisation
K. Shivarudraiah	Cinema
A. R. Raju	Cinema
Sarigama Viji	Cinema
P. M. Chikkaboraiah	Education
K. Shanthaiah	Education
Azra	Education
Basavaraj Thambake	Agriculture
Harish Hande	Science
K. N. Thilak Kumar	Media
G. S. Kumar	Media
Manjunath Bhat	Media
Pratap Simha	Media
Jagadeesh Maniyani	Media
Tejaswini Bai	Sports
Ramesh Tikaram	Sports
B. Ramesh	Medicine
Basavannaiah	Medicine
M. N. Nandakumar	Overseas Kannadiga
Purushottam Bilimale	Overseas Kannadiga
Aikala Harish Shetty	Overseas Kannadiga
Neramballi Raghavendra Rao	Overseas Kannadiga
Amjad Khan	Social Work
M. B. Naradunda	Social Work
Siddaiah	Others
M. R. V. Prasad	Others
Shivanand Chennaveerappa	Others
Mahatma Gandhi Khadi Gramodyoga Mandali	Institution
Shantivana Trust	Institution
