= Santhemarahalli Assembly constituency =

Former Assembly constituency in Karnataka, India

Coordinates: 12.043667°N 76.979520°E

Santhemarahalli
- Former constituency for the Karnataka Legislative Assembly

Constituency details
- Country: India
- Region: South India
- State: Karnataka
- Division: Mysore
- District: Chamarajanagar
- Lok Sabha constituency: Chamarajanagar
- Established: 1962
- Abolished: 2008
- Reservation: SC

Santhemarahalli Assembly constituency was one of the constituencies in Karnataka state assembly in India until 2008 when it was made defunct. It was part of Chamarajanagar Lok Sabha constituency.

== Members of the Legislative Assembly ==
Election	Member	Party
1962	B. Rachaiah	Indian National Congress
1967	B. Rachaiah	Indian National Congress
1972	K. Siddaiah	Indian National Congress
1978	M. Madaiah (Ramasamundra)	Indian National Congress
1983	B. Rachaiah	Janata Party
1985	B. Rachaiah	Janata Party
1989	K. Siddaiah	Indian National Congress
1994	A. R. Krishnamurthy	Janata Dal
1999	A. R. Krishnamurthy	Janata Dal
2004	R. Dhruvanarayana	Indian National Congress

== Election results ==
=== Assembly Election 2004 ===
2004 Karnataka Legislative Assembly election : Santhemarahalli
Party	Candidate	Votes	%	±%
INC	R. Dhruvanarayana	40,752	42.77%	▲29.46
JD(S)	A. R. Krishnamurthy	40,751	42.77%	▲32.51
BSP	Krishna Murthy. C. M	5,742	6.03%	New
BJP	Hemavathi. S	3,556	3.73%	▼30.85
JP	Krishna Murthy. M. S	2,385	2.50%	New
Kannada Nadu Party	Mahadevaiah. P	2,091	2.19%	New
Margin of victory		1	0.00%	▼7.28
Turnout		95,295	72.19%	▼0.59
Total valid votes		95,277		
Registered electors		132,014		▲7.84
INC gain from JD(U)		Swing	▲0.92	

=== Assembly Election 1999 ===
1999 Karnataka Legislative Assembly election : Santhemarahalli
Party	Candidate	Votes	%	±%
JD(U)	A. R. Krishnamurthy	33,977	41.85%	New
BJP	R. Dhruvanarayana	28,071	34.58%	▲1.24
INC	C. M. Mahadedevappa	10,803	13.31%	▲9.47
JD(S)	S. Mahadevaiah	8,327	10.26%	New
Margin of victory		5,906	7.28%	▼7.50
Turnout		89,091	72.78%	▼0.79
Total valid votes		81,178		
Rejected ballots		7,872	8.84%	▲6.36
Registered electors		122,416		▲5.89
JD(U) gain from JD		Swing	▼6.27	

=== Assembly Election 1994 ===
1994 Karnataka Legislative Assembly election : Santhemarahalli
Party	Candidate	Votes	%	±%
JD	A. R. Krishnamurthy	39,905	48.12%	▲16.41
BJP	T. Gopal	27,652	33.34%	▲32.25
KRRS	Someshwara	6,921	8.35%	New
INC	K. Siddaiah	3,184	3.84%	▼53.11
INC	T. Mahadevaiah	2,058	2.48%	New
Independent	Puttamadaiah	1,093	1.32%	New
Kannada Chalavali Vatal Paksha	Chikkaramaiayh	563	0.68%	New
Independent	Malathi. S. S	556	0.67%	New
Margin of victory		12,253	14.78%	▼10.46
Turnout		85,048	73.57%	▲3.04
Total valid votes		82,927		
Rejected ballots		2,110	2.48%	▼5.32
Registered electors		115,604		▲6.85
JD gain from INC		Swing	▼8.83	

=== Assembly Election 1989 ===
1989 Karnataka Legislative Assembly election : Santhemarahalli
Party	Candidate	Votes	%	±%
INC	K. Siddaiah	40,066	56.95%	▲14.08
JD	A. R. Krishnamurthy	22,310	31.71%	New
JP	B. P. Puttabuddi	4,264	6.06%	New
Independent	R. Krishna	1,683	2.39%	New
BJP	Kerehalli Devaiah	765	1.09%	New
Independent	B. Lingaiah	451	0.64%	New
Margin of victory		17,756	25.24%	▲16.44
Turnout		76,307	70.53%	▼1.64
Total valid votes		70,356		
Rejected ballots		5,951	7.80%	▲5.46
Registered electors		108,192		▲25.02
INC gain from JP		Swing	▲5.28	

=== Assembly Election 1985 ===
1985 Karnataka Legislative Assembly election : Santhemarahalli
Party	Candidate	Votes	%	±%
JP	B. Rachaiah	31,519	51.67%	▼7.59
INC	M. Shivanna	26,149	42.87%	▲8.56
LKD	Mallanna	2,456	4.03%	New
Independent	T. S. Mahadevaiah	872	1.43%	New
Margin of victory		5,370	8.80%	▼16.15
Turnout		62,458	72.17%	▲8.45
Total valid votes		60,996		
Rejected ballots		1,462	2.34%	▼0.70
Registered electors		86,542		▲2.37
JP hold		Swing	▼7.59	

=== Assembly Election 1983 ===
1983 Karnataka Legislative Assembly election : Santhemarahalli
Party	Candidate	Votes	%	±%
JP	B. Rachaiah	30,954	59.26%	▲17.64
INC	M. Shivanna	17,922	34.31%	▲31.48
Independent	M. Madiah	1,774	3.40%	New
INC(J)	Swamy. N. B. N	857	1.64%	New
Independent	Nagaraja. K. B	729	1.40%	New
Margin of victory		13,032	24.95%	▲21.78
Turnout		53,871	63.72%	▼4.06
Total valid votes		52,236		
Rejected ballots		1,635	3.04%	▼0.48
Registered electors		84,539		▲7.52
JP gain from INC(I)		Swing	▲14.47	

=== Assembly Election 1978 ===
1978 Karnataka Legislative Assembly election : Santhemarahalli
Party	Candidate	Votes	%	±%
INC(I)	M. Madaiah (Ramasamundra)	23,026	44.79%	New
JP	S. M. Siddayya	21,398	41.62%	New
Independent	N. C. Biligiri Ranaiah	4,093	7.96%	New
INC	R. M. Kantharaj	1,453	2.83%	▼54.17
Independent	M. Madaiah (Johtigownapura)	835	1.62%	New
Independent	M. Neelakantaiah	608	1.18%	New
Margin of victory		1,628	3.17%	▼22.52
Turnout		53,291	67.78%	▲22.64
Total valid votes		51,413		
Rejected ballots		1,878	3.52%	▲3.52
Registered electors		78,623		▲32.09
INC(I) gain from INC		Swing	▼12.21	

=== Assembly Election 1972 ===
1972 Mysore State Legislative Assembly election : Santhemarahalli
Party	Candidate	Votes	%	±%
INC	K. Siddaiah	14,769	57.00%	▼16.31
INC(O)	B. Baavanna	8,112	31.31%	New
Independent	N. Basavaraju	1,912	7.38%	New
SSP	M. Madiah	1,119	4.32%	New
Margin of victory		6,657	25.69%	▼32.82
Turnout		26,870	45.14%	▼23.92
Total valid votes		25,912		
Registered electors		59,522		▲16.48
INC hold		Swing	▼16.31	

=== Assembly Election 1967 ===
1967 Mysore State Legislative Assembly election : Santhemarahalli
Party	Candidate	Votes	%	±%
INC	B. Rachaiah	24,082	73.31%	▲19.99
Independent	L. H. Siddaiah	4,861	14.80%	New
Independent	M. Madiah	1,472	4.48%	New
SWA	N. Rachaiah	1,447	4.40%	New
Independent	M. Puttaswamy	989	3.01%	New
Margin of victory		19,221	58.51%	▲50.40
Turnout		35,288	69.06%	▲1.24
Total valid votes		32,851		
Registered electors		51,099		▲3.94
INC hold		Swing	▲19.99	

=== Assembly Election 1962 ===
1962 Mysore State Legislative Assembly election : Santhemarahalli
Party	Candidate	Votes	%	±%
INC	B. Rachaiah	16,796	53.32%	New
PSP	B. Basaviah	14,240	45.21%	New
Independent	T. N. Rachaiah	464	1.47%	New
Margin of victory		2,556	8.11%	
Turnout		33,345	67.82%	
Total valid votes		31,500		
Registered electors		49,164		
INC win (new seat)				

== See also ==
- List of constituencies of the Karnataka Legislative Assembly
