= Cheluvanahalli =

Coordinates: 12°12′N 77°09′E

- Village
- Interactive map of Cheluvanahalli
- Country: India
- State: Karnataka
- District: Chamarajanagar
- Subdistrict: Kollegal
- Time zone: UTC+05:30 (IST)
- Pincode: 571440

Cheluvanahalli is a small village in the southern state Karnataka in India, Chamrajnagar district, Kollegal taluk (sub-district), Saraguru post, Palya hobli, and Dhanagere village panchayath. Pin:571440, L&L:12.199934N,77.148640E.

It is located between Kollegal (7 km towards Malavalli) and Malavalli (28 km towards Kollegal). The National Highway NH 209 runs through the village outskirts. Hills surround one-third of the village and they are connected to Sri Male Mahadeshwara Hills and Sri Biligiriranga Hills. The village is nearer the two largest Falls Gaganachukki and Bharachukki.

There are about 90 families living in the village and all are Hindu religions (Caste: Virashiva Lingayatism). The main occupation of people in the village is agriculture and they are very successful in it as compared to the whole district's average farming. The main crops are paddy (rice), sugarcane, turmeric, maize, banana, and vegetables such as tomato, beans, cauliflower, brinjal, cucumber, chili, etc.
