= Nanjangud Assembly constituency =

Legislative Assembly constituency in Karnataka State, India

Coordinates: 12.11°N 76.67°E

Nanjangud
- Constituency No. 214 for the Karnataka Legislative Assembly
- Map of Vidhana Sabha constituency

Constituency details
- Country: India
- Region: South India
- State: Karnataka
- District: Mysore
- Lok Sabha constituency: Chamarajanagar
- Established: 1951
- Total electors: 220,420 (2023)
- Reservation: SC

Member of Legislative Assembly
- 16th Karnataka Legislative Assembly
- Incumbent Darshan Dhruvanarayana
- Party: Indian National Congress
- Elected year: 2023
- Preceded by: B. Harshavardhan

Assembly Constituencies of Mysore district

Nanjangud Assembly constituency is one of the 224 Legislative Assembly constituencies of Karnataka in India.

It is part of Mysore district and is reserved for candidates belonging to the Scheduled Castes.

== Members of the Legislative Assembly ==
| Election | Member | Party |
|---|---|---|
| 1952 | M. Linganna | Independent politician |
| 1952 | M. Madaiah | Indian National Congress |
| 1957 | P. Mahadevaiah | Indian National Congress |
| 1957 By-election (Note: Died in 1957) | J. B. Mallaradhya | Praja Socialist Party |
| 1962 | N. Rachaiah | Indian National Congress |
| 1967 | L. Srikantaiah | Independent politician |
| 1972 | K. B. Shivaiah | Indian National Congress |
| 1978 | K. B. Shivaiah | Indian National Congress |
| 1983 | M. Mahadev | Indian National Congress |
| 1985 | D. T. Jayakumar | Janata Party |
| 1989 | M. Mahadev | Indian National Congress |
| 1994 | D. T. Jayakumar | Janata Dal |
| 1999 | M. Mahadev | Indian National Congress |
| 2004 | D. T. Jayakumar | Janata Dal |
| 2008 | Srinivasa Prasad | Indian National Congress |
| 2013 | Srinivasa Prasad | Indian National Congress |
| 2017 By-election (Note: Resigned on 20 October 2016) | Kalale. N. Keshavamurthy | Indian National Congress |
| 2018 | B. Harshavardhan | Bharatiya Janata Party |
| 2023 | Darshan Dhruvanarayana | Indian National Congress |

== Election results ==
=== Assembly Election 2023 ===
2023 Karnataka Legislative Assembly election : Nanjangud
| Party | Candidate | Votes | % | ±% |
|---|---|---|---|---|
| INC | Darshan Dhruvanarayana | 109,125 | 62.05 | ▲22.07 |
| BJP | B. Harshavardhan | 61,518 | 34.98 | ▼12.61 |
| NOTA | None of the above | 1,452 | 0.83 | ▼0.36 |
| Margin of victory | | 47,607 | 27.07 | ▲19.46 |
| Turnout | | 176,171 | 79.93 | ▲1.36 |
| Total valid votes | | 175,864 | | |
| Registered electors | | 220,420 | | ▲5.40 |
| INC gain from BJP | | Swing | ▲14.46 | |

=== Assembly Election 2018 ===
2018 Karnataka Legislative Assembly election : Nanjangud
| Party | Candidate | Votes | % | ±% |
|---|---|---|---|---|
| BJP | B. Harshavardhan | 78,030 | 47.59 | ▲5.64 |
| INC | Kalale. N. Keshavamurthy | 65,551 | 39.98 | ▼15.77 |
| JD(S) | Dayanandamurthy. H. S | 13,679 | 8.34 | New |
| NOTA | None of the above | 1,947 | 1.19 | ▲0.11 |
| API | Doddaswamy | 1,363 | 0.83 | New |
| Margin of victory | | 12,479 | 7.61 | ▼6.19 |
| Turnout | | 164,305 | 78.57 | ▲1.12 |
| Total valid votes | | 163,979 | | |
| Registered electors | | 209,121 | | ▲3.61 |
| BJP gain from INC | | Swing | ▼8.16 | |

=== Assembly By-election 2017 ===
2017 Karnataka Legislative Assembly by-election : Nanjangud
| Party | Candidate | Votes | % | ±% |
|---|---|---|---|---|
| INC | Kalale. N. Keshavamurthy | 86,212 | 55.75 | ▲16.02 |
| BJP | V. Srivinasa Prasad | 64,878 | 41.95 | ▲36.42 |
| NOTA | None of the above | 1,665 | 1.08 | New |
| Margin of victory | | 21,334 | 13.80 | ▲6.80 |
| Turnout | | 156,315 | 77.45 | ▲1.24 |
| Total valid votes | | 154,650 | | |
| Registered electors | | 201,826 | | ▲9.04 |
| INC hold | | Swing | ▲16.02 | |

=== Assembly Election 2013 ===
2013 Karnataka Legislative Assembly election : Nanjangud
| Party | Candidate | Votes | % | ±% |
|---|---|---|---|---|
| INC | Srinivasa Prasad | 50,784 | 39.73 | ▲4.96 |
| JD(S) | Kalale. N. Keshavamurthy | 41,843 | 32.74 | ▲12.02 |
| KJP | S. Mahadevaiah | 28,312 | 22.15 | New |
| BJP | Dr. Shivarama | 7,074 | 5.53 | ▼28.66 |
| Independent | M. Shivaram Mulluru | 2,651 | 2.07 | New |
| BSP | Srikanta | 2,255 | 1.76 | ▼1.90 |
| Samajwadi Janata Party (Karnataka) | Gangothry Rangaswamy | 1,667 | 1.30 | New |
| HND | Shrungara Sarja | 1,136 | 0.89 | New |
| Independent | N. Rukmini | 1,128 | 0.88 | New |
| Margin of victory | | 8,941 | 7.00 | ▲6.43 |
| Turnout | | 141,057 | 76.21 | ▲4.22 |
| Total valid votes | | 127,812 | | |
| Registered electors | | 185,095 | | ▲7.96 |
| INC hold | | Swing | ▲4.96 | |

=== Assembly Election 2008 ===
2008 Karnataka Legislative Assembly election : Nanjangud
| Party | Candidate | Votes | % | ±% |
|---|---|---|---|---|
| INC | Srinivasa Prasad | 42,867 | 34.77 | ▲10.11 |
| BJP | S. Mahadevaiah | 42,159 | 34.19 | ▲12.73 |
| JD(S) | N. Keshavamurthy | 25,551 | 20.72 | ▼22.18 |
| BSP | C. M. Mahadevappa | 4,513 | 3.66 | ▼3.19 |
| Independent | Shrungara Sarja | 3,069 | 2.49 | New |
| SP | R. Madeshan | 2,044 | 1.66 | New |
| Independent | C. Mallesha | 1,143 | 0.93 | New |
| JD(U) | K. C. Shivananda | 1,018 | 0.83 | New |
| Independent | M. Puttaswamy | 937 | 0.76 | New |
| Margin of victory | | 708 | 0.57 | ▼17.67 |
| Turnout | | 123,430 | 71.99 | ▼4.03 |
| Total valid votes | | 123,301 | | |
| Registered electors | | 171,450 | | ▲21.37 |
| INC gain from JD(S) | | Swing | ▼8.13 | |

=== Assembly Election 2004 ===
2004 Karnataka Legislative Assembly election : Nanjangud
| Party | Candidate | Votes | % | ±% |
|---|---|---|---|---|
| JD(S) | D. T. Jayakumar | 46,068 | 42.90 | ▲14.56 |
| INC | M. Mahadev | 26,483 | 24.66 | ▼12.17 |
| BJP | Somashekara | 23,045 | 21.46 | ▲17.41 |
| BSP | Nagaraju. N | 7,357 | 6.85 | New |
| JP | Nandini Gowda. D. R | 2,491 | 2.32 | New |
| Kannada Nadu Party | B. A. Shivashankar | 1,944 | 1.81 | New |
| Margin of victory | | 19,585 | 18.24 | ▲9.75 |
| Turnout | | 107,389 | 76.02 | ▲0.70 |
| Total valid votes | | 107,388 | | |
| Registered electors | | 141,265 | | ▲6.42 |
| JD(S) gain from INC | | Swing | ▲6.07 | |

=== Assembly Election 1999 ===
1999 Karnataka Legislative Assembly election : Nanjangud
| Party | Candidate | Votes | % | ±% |
|---|---|---|---|---|
| INC | M. Mahadev | 34,701 | 36.83 | ▲7.83 |
| JD(S) | D. T. Jayakumar | 26,703 | 28.34 | New |
| JD(U) | L. N. Shivayogi | 23,399 | 24.84 | New |
| BJP | Dr. C. N. Mruthyunjayappa | 3,818 | 4.05 | ▼0.93 |
| Independent | T. Srikanta | 1,944 | 2.06 | New |
| Independent | S. Sunder | 1,900 | 2.02 | New |
| Independent | B. A. Shivashankar | 1,355 | 1.44 | New |
| Margin of victory | | 7,998 | 8.49 | ▼23.00 |
| Turnout | | 99,985 | 75.32 | ▼3.25 |
| Total valid votes | | 94,216 | | |
| Rejected ballots | | 5,733 | 5.73 | ▲3.65 |
| Registered electors | | 132,742 | | ▲9.32 |
| INC gain from JD | | Swing | ▼23.66 | |

=== Assembly Election 1994 ===
1994 Karnataka Legislative Assembly election : Nanjangud
| Party | Candidate | Votes | % | ±% |
|---|---|---|---|---|
| JD | D. T. Jayakumar | 56,513 | 60.49 | ▲29.52 |
| INC | M. Mahadev | 27,097 | 29.00 | ▼18.63 |
| BJP | B. Yogesh | 4,655 | 4.98 | ▲2.35 |
| INC | N. Narasimha Swamy | 3,332 | 3.57 | New |
| Margin of victory | | 29,416 | 31.49 | ▲14.83 |
| Turnout | | 95,406 | 78.57 | ▲3.16 |
| Total valid votes | | 93,423 | | |
| Rejected ballots | | 1,983 | 2.08 | ▼5.41 |
| Registered electors | | 121,421 | | ▲11.53 |
| JD gain from INC | | Swing | ▲12.86 | |

=== Assembly Election 1989 ===
1989 Karnataka Legislative Assembly election : Nanjangud
| Party | Candidate | Votes | % | ±% |
|---|---|---|---|---|
| INC | M. Mahadev | 36,176 | 47.63 | ▲5.26 |
| JD | D. T. Jayakumar | 23,525 | 30.97 | New |
| JP | M. Y. Puttanna | 11,007 | 14.49 | New |
| BJP | B. Yogesh | 2,001 | 2.63 | ▲1.24 |
| Kranti Sabha | Raghupati Naika | 1,457 | 1.92 | New |
| Independent | G. Nagaraju | 563 | 0.74 | New |
| Margin of victory | | 12,651 | 16.66 | ▲9.55 |
| Turnout | | 82,102 | 75.41 | ▲4.54 |
| Total valid votes | | 75,956 | | |
| Rejected ballots | | 6,146 | 7.49 | ▲5.10 |
| Registered electors | | 108,868 | | ▲25.72 |
| INC gain from JP | | Swing | ▼1.86 | |

=== Assembly Election 1985 ===
1985 Karnataka Legislative Assembly election : Nanjangud
| Party | Candidate | Votes | % | ±% |
|---|---|---|---|---|
| JP | D. T. Jayakumar | 29,644 | 49.49 | ▲10.96 |
| INC | M. Linganna | 25,382 | 42.37 | ▲3.75 |
| Independent | Mallanna | 3,512 | 5.86 | New |
| BJP | N. C. Siddappa Gowda | 830 | 1.39 | ▼7.97 |
| Independent | Sidda Shetty | 534 | 0.89 | New |
| Margin of victory | | 4,262 | 7.11 | ▲7.02 |
| Turnout | | 61,370 | 70.87 | ▲6.36 |
| Total valid votes | | 59,902 | | |
| Rejected ballots | | 1,468 | 2.39 | ▼0.48 |
| Registered electors | | 86,598 | | ▲9.58 |
| JP gain from INC | | Swing | ▲10.87 | |

=== Assembly Election 1983 ===
1983 Karnataka Legislative Assembly election : Nanjangud
| Party | Candidate | Votes | % | ±% |
|---|---|---|---|---|
| INC | M. Mahadev | 19,124 | 38.62 | ▲23.71 |
| JP | K. Narasegowda | 19,079 | 38.53 | ▲13.83 |
| BJP | H. Lingappa | 4,635 | 9.36 | New |
| Independent | Mallanna | 3,852 | 7.78 | New |
| Independent | Mada Setty | 864 | 1.74 | New |
| Independent | Srinivasegowda | 845 | 1.71 | New |
| Independent | Katoor Siddanaika | 502 | 1.01 | New |
| INC(J) | N. S. Raja Iyyanagar | 342 | 0.69 | New |
| Margin of victory | | 45 | 0.09 | ▼12.95 |
| Turnout | | 50,978 | 64.51 | ▼9.62 |
| Total valid votes | | 49,515 | | |
| Rejected ballots | | 1,463 | 2.87 | ▼0.53 |
| Registered electors | | 79,024 | | ▲8.77 |
| INC gain from INC(I) | | Swing | ▲0.87 | |

=== Assembly Election 1978 ===
1978 Karnataka Legislative Assembly election : Nanjangud
| Party | Candidate | Votes | % | ±% |
|---|---|---|---|---|
| INC(I) | K. B. Shivaiah | 19,639 | 37.75 | New |
| JP | Puttaveer Tharak | 12,854 | 24.70 | New |
| Independent | M. Linganna | 9,724 | 18.69 | New |
| INC | D. T. Jayakumar | 7,760 | 14.91 | ▼33.25 |
| Independent | L. Nagappa | 1,244 | 2.39 | New |
| Independent | M. Krishnaiah | 738 | 1.42 | New |
| Margin of victory | | 6,785 | 13.04 | ▼7.96 |
| Turnout | | 53,859 | 74.13 | ▲15.77 |
| Total valid votes | | 52,030 | | |
| Rejected ballots | | 1,829 | 3.40 | ▲3.40 |
| Registered electors | | 72,650 | | ▲20.13 |
| INC(I) gain from INC | | Swing | ▼10.41 | |

=== Assembly Election 1972 ===
1972 Mysore State Legislative Assembly election : Nanjangud
| Party | Candidate | Votes | % | ±% |
|---|---|---|---|---|
| INC | K. B. Shivaiah | 16,334 | 48.16 | ▲19.82 |
| Independent | Slrikantaiah | 9,212 | 27.16 | New |
| INC(O) | Javakariah Sosale | 6,484 | 19.12 | New |
| Independent | L. Nagappa | 1,888 | 5.57 | New |
| Margin of victory | | 7,122 | 21.00 | ▲7.66 |
| Turnout | | 35,294 | 58.36 | ▼4.01 |
| Total valid votes | | 33,918 | | |
| Registered electors | | 60,475 | | ▲12.41 |
| INC gain from Independent | | Swing | ▲6.49 | |

=== Assembly Election 1967 ===
1967 Mysore State Legislative Assembly election : Nanjangud
| Party | Candidate | Votes | % | ±% |
|---|---|---|---|---|
| Independent | L. Srikantaiah | 12,787 | 41.67 | New |
| INC | N. Rachaiah | 8,695 | 28.34 | ▼23.02 |
| SWA | B. N. S. Aradhya | 6,513 | 21.23 | New |
| Independent | Puttarangiah | 1,144 | 3.73 | New |
| Independent | Nanjaiah | 1,045 | 3.41 | New |
| Independent | Mahadeviah | 499 | 1.63 | New |
| Margin of victory | | 4,092 | 13.34 | ▲3.71 |
| Turnout | | 33,551 | 62.37 | ▲1.07 |
| Total valid votes | | 30,683 | | |
| Registered electors | | 53,797 | | ▲5.94 |
| Independent gain from INC | | Swing | ▼9.69 | |

=== Assembly Election 1962 ===
1962 Mysore State Legislative Assembly election : Nanjangud
| Party | Candidate | Votes | % | ±% |
|---|---|---|---|---|
| INC | N. Rachaiah | 14,855 | 51.36 | ▲5.51 |
| Independent | L. Srikantaiah | 12,070 | 41.73 | New |
| Independent | N. S. Raja Iyengar | 1,996 | 6.90 | New |
| Margin of victory | | 2,785 | 9.63 | ▲1.32 |
| Turnout | | 31,130 | 61.30 | |
| Total valid votes | | 28,921 | | |
| Registered electors | | 50,782 | | |
| INC gain from PSP | | Swing | ▼2.79 | |

=== Assembly By-election 1957 ===
1957 Mysore State Legislative Assembly by-election : Nanjangud
| Party | Candidate | Votes | % | ±% |
|---|---|---|---|---|
| PSP | J. B. Mallaradhya | 14,304 | 54.15 | ▲17.37 |
| INC | N. Rachaiah | 12,110 | 45.85 | ▼17.37 |
| Margin of victory | | 2,194 | 8.31 | ▼18.13 |
| Total valid votes | | 26,414 | | |
| PSP gain from INC | | Swing | ▼9.07 | |

=== Assembly Election 1957 ===
1957 Mysore State Legislative Assembly election : Nanjangud
| Party | Candidate | Votes | % | ±% |
|---|---|---|---|---|
| INC | P. Mahadevaiah | 15,391 | 63.22 | ▲34.04 |
| PSP | B. N. S. Aradhya | 8,955 | 36.78 | New |
| Margin of victory | | 6,436 | 26.44 | ▲25.79 |
| Turnout | | 24,346 | 55.78 | ▼13.09 |
| Total valid votes | | 24,346 | | |
| Registered electors | | 43,650 | | ▼43.40 |
| INC gain from Independent | | Swing | ▲42.28 | |

=== Assembly Election 1952 ===
1952 Mysore State Legislative Assembly election : Nanjangud
| Party | Candidate | Votes | % | ±% |
|---|---|---|---|---|
| Independent | M. Linganna | 11,122 | 20.94 | New |
| Independent | B. N. S. Aradhya | 10,778 | 20.29 | New |
| INC | D. M. Siddaiah | 8,565 | 16.13 | New |
| INC | M. Madaiah | 6,930 | 13.05 | New |
| SCF | M. C. Biligiri Rangaiah | 6,277 | 11.82 | New |
| KMPP | N. S. Lingappa | 5,114 | 9.63 | New |
| KMPP | B. Basavaiah | 4,322 | 8.14 | New |
| Margin of victory | | 344 | 0.65 | |
| Turnout | | 53,108 | 34.43 | |
| Total valid votes | | 53,108 | | |
| Registered electors | | 77,115 | | |
| Independent win (new seat) | | | | |

== See also ==
- List of constituencies of the Karnataka Legislative Assembly
- Mysore district
