= Aravind Malagatti =

Indian Kannada poet, critic

Aravinda Malagatti
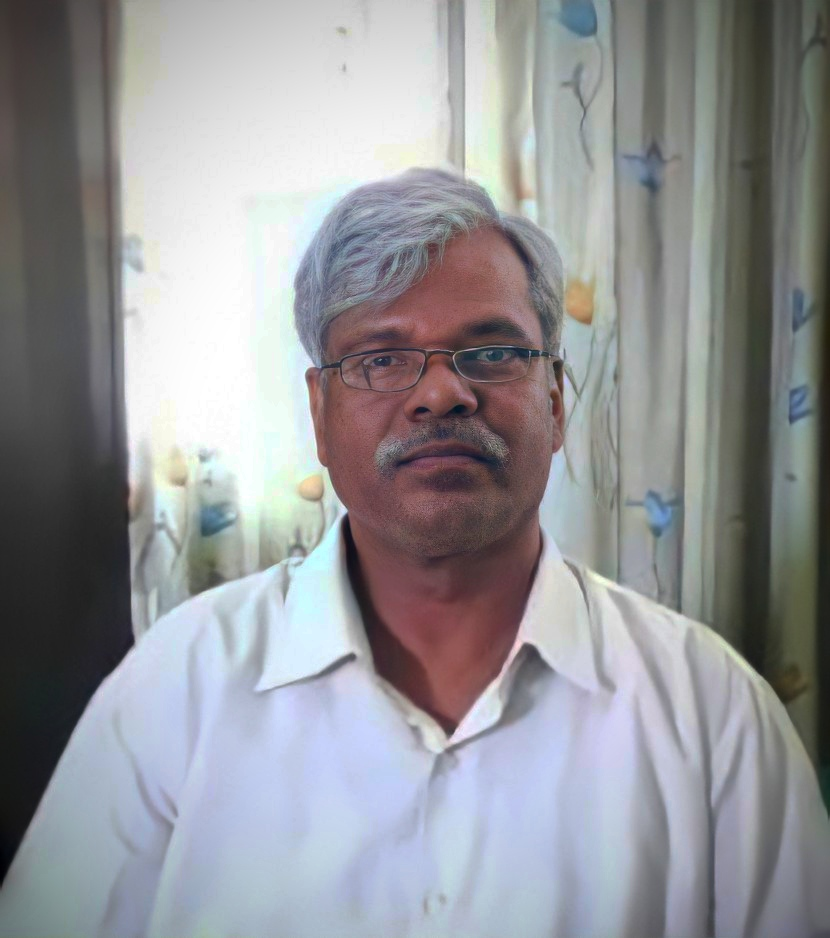
- Malagatti in 2020
- Born: 1 May 1956 (age 70); Muddebihal, Mysuru State, (present-day Karnataka) India
- Occupations: Professor, writer

Aravind Malagatti (born 1 May 1956) is an Indian prominent poet and writer in Kannada-language. He is the author of more than forty books which include poetry collections, short fiction collections, a novel, essay-collections, critical works and folklore studies. He is the recipient of the prestigious Ambedkar Fellowship Award from the Government of Karnataka. His Government Brahamana, the first Dalit autobiography in Kannada, has won the Karnataka Sahitya Academy Award. Apart from these, the Honorary Award of Karnataka Sahitya Academy was conferred on him for his total contribution to Kannada literature. He is appointed as Chairman for Kannada Sahitya Academy.

Malagatti is known for being a thoughtful orator. He has founded a number of Dalit organizations and has played an active role in the Dalit movement. He served as professor of Kannada in the Kuvempu Institute of Kannada Studies, Mysore University. He has also served as the Director of the Institute and as the Director of Prasaranga, the publication wing of Mysore University, prior to this. He is also served as the Hon. Director of Jayalakshmi Vilas Palace Museum, Mysore University.

== Bibliography ==
=== Poetry ===
- Mookanige Baayi Bandaaga (When the dumb opens his mouth, 1982)
- Kappu Kavya (Black Poetry, 1985)
- Mooraneya Kannu (The Third Eye, 1996)
- Naada Nianaada(Rhythm Re-Rhythm, 1999)
- Aneel Aradhana (Composite Poetry, 2002)
- Silicon City Mattu Kogile (Silicon City and the Cuckoo, 2003)
- Chandaal Swargaarohanam (The Untouchable Ascends to Heaven, 2003)
- Aravinda Malagattiyavara Ayda Kavithegalu (Selected Poems of Aravind Malagatti, 2004)
- Kavyakumkume(Selected Poems of Aravinda Malagatti, 2009)
- The Dark Cosmos: Selected Poems of Aravinda Malagatti (2009) Translated into English by Dr. C. Naganna aravinda malagatti
- Vishwatomukha (Towards the universe, 2010)
- Huvu Balubhara (Flower is too heavy, 2010)
- Ru Nisheda Chakrakavya (Rupee Banned Circle Poetry, 2016)
- Government Brahmana (government Brahman)

=== Short stories ===
- Mugiyada Kategalu (Unending Stories, 2000)

=== Novel ===
- Karya (The Death Ceremony, 1988)

=== Drama ===
- Masthakaabhisheka (The Ablution, 1983)
- Samudradolagana Uppu (The Salt in the Ocean, 1999)

=== Criticism, literary and social thought ===
- Dalitha Yuga Mattu Kannada Sahithya (Dalit Millennium and Kannada Literature, 1999)
- Dalita Prange: Sahithya, Samaaja Mattu Samskuthi (Dalit Consciousness: Literature, society and Culture, 2003)
- Samskuthika Dange (Cultural mutiny, 2004)
- Benki Beldingalu (Fire and Moonlight, 2006)
- Sahitya Saakshi(A Collection of Critical Essays, 2009)
- Selected writing's of Aravind Malagatti(Translated works, Ed. Prof: D.A.Shankar, 2011)

=== Autobiography ===
Government Brahmana (1994) Translated into English, Pub. Oriental Longman

=== Folklore research and miscellany ===
- Anipeeni-Janapada Samshodhane (1983)
- Jaanapada Vyasanga (Study of Folklore, 1985)
- Jaanapada Shobha (Search for Folklore, 1990)
- Thuluvara Aati Kalenja-Janapada Samshodane (1993)
- Janapada Aatagalu (Folk Games, 1993)

=== Research ===
- Bhootaradhane (Ghost Worship, 1991)
- Dalita Sahithya Chalvaliy thatvika Chinthane (Theoretical Study of Dalit Literary Movement, 1991)
- Purana Jaanapada mattu Deshivaada (Myth, Folklore and Nativism, 1998)
- Janapada Aatagalu (Folk Games Ph.D. Thesis-1985)
- Janapada Abhiyana (Folk Journey, 2005)
- Chutuku Chinthana (A Study of Epigrams, 2016 )

=== Studies and reflections ===
- Dalitha Sahithya Praveshike (An Introduction to Dalit Literature, 1996)
- Antharjaathiy Vivaaha yeshtu pragathipara? (How Progressive is Intercaste-Marriage? 1996)
- Poonapyakt Mattu Dalitarettha Sagabeku? (Poona Pact: What Should be the Dalit Approach? 1998)
- Dalitha Sahithya Yana (Journey to Dalit Literature, 2016)

== See also ==
- K. B. Siddaiah
- Siddalingaiah
- C. P. Siddhashrama
- Nanjaiah Honganuru
- C. P. Krishnakumar
