= R. Dhruvanarayana =

Indian politician (1961–2023)

Member of Parliament, Lok Sabha
- In office 2009–2019
- Constituency: Chamarajanagar

Member of Karnataka Legislative Assembly
- In office 2008–2009
- Preceded by: Balraj S
- Succeeded by: G. N. N. Swamy
- Constituency: Kollegal
- In office 2004–2008
- Constituency: Santhemarahalli

Personal details
- Born: 31 July 1961 Heggavadi, Chamarajanagar district, Mysore State, India
- Died: 11 March 2023 (aged 61) Mysuru, Karnataka, India
- Cause of death: Cardiac Arrest
- Party: Indian National Congress
- Children: Darshan Dhruvanarayana
- Education: B.Sc. (Agriculture), M.Sc. (Agriculture) from University of Agricultural Sciences, Bangalore
- Profession: Agriculturist
- Website: www.dhruvanarayana.in

Rangaswamy Dhruvanarayana (31 July 1961 – 11 March 2023) was an Indian politician and member of Parliament of Lok Sabha. He was a member of the 15th and 16th Lok Sabha of India. He represented the Chamarajanagar constituency of Karnataka and was a member of the Indian National Congress.

== Political career ==
Rangaswamy Dhruvanarayana started his political journey as a student leader. In 1983, he joined the Congress as a party worker. In 1984, he held the position of president of the students’ union of Agriculture College, Hebbal, Bangalore. In the same year, he was also president of the National Students Union of India, Bangalore City. In 1986, he went on to serve as general secretary of the Karnataka State Youth Congress.

In 1999, he contested his first Vidhan Sabha elections from Santhemarahalli Constituency, which he lost. In 2004, he contested from the same constituency and won by a margin of a single vote defeating JD (secular) candidate A. R. Krishnamurthy. In 2008, he contested the Vidhan Sabha elections from Kollegal constituency and won by a margin of 11,800 votes. Subsequently, he was elected to the 15th Lok Sabha from Chamarajanagara constituency with a margin of 4,020 votes. Once again in 2014, he was elected to the 16th Lok Sabha as member of Parliament with a margin of 141,182 votes. In 2019, Dhruvanarayan lost to Srinivasa Prasad in the 17th Lok Sabha elections by 12,716 votes.

=== Election results ===
Election	Year	Result	Margin
Vidhan Sabha Elections, Karnataka	1999	Lost	5906 votes
Vidhan Sabha Elections, Karnataka	2004	Won	1 vote
Vidhan Sabha Elections, Karnataka	2008	Won	11,800 votes
15th Lok Sabha Elections	2009	Won	4,020 votes
16th Lok Sabha Elections	2014	Won	141,182 votes
17th Lok Sabha Elections	2019	Lost	1817 votes

=== 2004 election result ===
2004 Karnataka Legislative Assembly election: Santhemarahalli
Party	Candidate	Votes	%	±%
INC	R. Dhruvanarayana	40,752	42.77	
JD(S)	A. R. Krishnamurthy	40,751	42.77	
BSP	Krishna Murthy C. M.	5,742	6.03	
BJP	Hemavathi S	5,977	3.58	
JP	Krishna Murthy M. S.	2,063	2.5	
Kannada Nadu Party	Mahadevaiah P.	2,091	2.19	
Majority		1	0.00001	
Turnout		95,277	72.19	
INC gain from JD(U)		Swing		
