= Darshan Dhruvanarayana =

Indian politician

Member of the Karnataka Legislative Assembly
- Incumbent
- Assumed office 2023
- Preceded by: Harshavardhan B.
- Constituency: Nanjangud

Personal details
- Born: 29 March 1995 (age 31) Mysore, India
- Party: Indian National Congress
- Parent: R. Dhruvanarayana

Darshan Dhruvanarayana is an Indian politician from Karnataka. He serves as member of Karnataka Legislative Assembly representing Nanjangud. He belongs to the Indian National Congress.He is the son of R. Dhruvanarayana.
