= Nanjaiah Honganuru =

Indian folklorist, writer

M. Nanjaiah
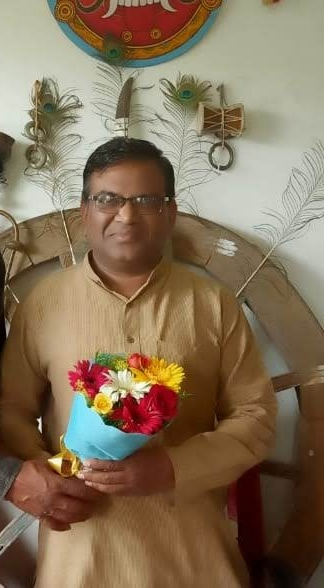
- Dr. Honganuru at Folklore Department, Mysore University
- Born: 1 June 1970 (age 56); Honganuru, Chamarajanagar, Karnataka, India
- Education: MA in Kannada; MA in Folklore; Diploma in Linguistics; Diploma in Women Studies; Ph. D.
- Occupations: Professor of Folklore, Mysore University
- Writing career
- Pen name: Nanjaiah Honganuru
- Genres: Folk Literature, Folk Medicine, Folk Arts, Tribelore, Place Names and Person Names and cultural studies

Nanjaiah Honganuru (Kannada: ಡಾ. ನಂಜಯ್ಯ ಹೊಂಗನೂರು), is an Indian Kannada folklorist in Karnataka state, where he is Professor of Folklore at Mysore University.

His books on folklore include Samagra Kannada Gadegalu (as an editor), Janapada Dasa Sampradaaya and Jaanapada Siri. Dr. Nanjaih presided the chair at the 1st "Jaanapada Mahasammelana" held in Chamarajanagara in 2017.

== Books ==
Honganuru’s books include:

- Jaanapada Mattu Chalanasheelathe (research works)
- Jaanapada siri
- Sthalanamagalu
- Janapada dasa sampradaya
- B. Rachaiah avara jeevana matthu rajaneethi
- Samagra Kannada Gadegalu(As an editor)

== Articles ==
His articles include:

- "Sthalanamagalu" ,1997
- "T. Narasipura Thalokina Sthalanamagalu", 1998
- "Honganurina Shishuprasagalu", 1999
- "Gundlupet Parisarada Sthalanamagalu", 2000
- "Janapada Dasa Sampradaaya", 2003
- "Badalavaneyatha Halligalu", 2005
- "Gramina Samskriti Indu mattu Naale", Janapada Karnataka No-1, Vol-4, Prasaranga, Kannada University, Hampi, 2005
- "Saaraswatha Tapaswi : Ondu Sthula Parichaya", Appeared in VIDVANMANI - Felicitation Volume of Vidwan M. Shivakumaraswamy Mysore, 1999
- "Janapada Drishti : Maagi", Bahujana Karnataka Vaara Pathrike Sanchike -2, 2001
- "Mysore Jilleya Mata Manyagalu", Prajamatha Mysore Jilleya Visheshanka
