= N. Mahesh =

Indian politician

Nanjaiah Mahesh

Minister of Primary and Secondary Education & Sakala of Karnataka
- In office June 2018 – October 2018
- Preceded by: Tanveer Sait
- Succeeded by: S. Suresh Kumar

Member of Karnataka Legislative Assembly
- In office 15 May 2018 – 2023
- Preceded by: S. Jayanna
- Succeeded by: A. R. Krishnamurthy
- Constituency: Kollegal

Personal details
- Born: Nanjaiah Mahesh; 1 June 1956 (age 70) Chamarajanagar, Karnataka, India
- Party: Bharatiya Janata Party (5 August 2021-present)
- Other political affiliations: Independent; Bahujan Samaj Party (suspended) (until October 2018)
- Occupation: Social worker, politician

Nanjaiah Mahesh (born 1 June 1956) is an Indian politician member of the Bharatiya Janata Party from 5 August 2021. He was Minister of State for Primary and Secondary Education of Karnataka in the H. D. Kumaraswamy cabinet, but resigned on 11 October 2018 citing personal reasons. He won the 2018 assembly elections from the Kollegal constituency.

== Education Minister ==
Mahesh took oath of his office of Primary and Secondary Education Ministry in the name of Buddha, Basava and Ambedkar. He emphasizes quality education and students' skill training at school level. He also proposed a plan to merge single teacher schools across the state and has also contemplated denying any permission to new private schools for the next three years. His ministry prepared a policy of capping fee structure of private CBSE and ICSE schools in the State. He experimented with Open Book system in Kannada schools, which was praised by K. S. Bhagawan. He launched 100 Schools 100 Books initiative for developing reading habit among children of Karnataka. He launched Career guidance and counselling cells in the colleges of Bangalore. N. Mahesh resigned as the Education Minister of Karnataka on 11 October 2018. On 5 August 2021 he joined BJP.
