= Chamarajanagar district =

- District of Karnataka
- Chamarajanagara
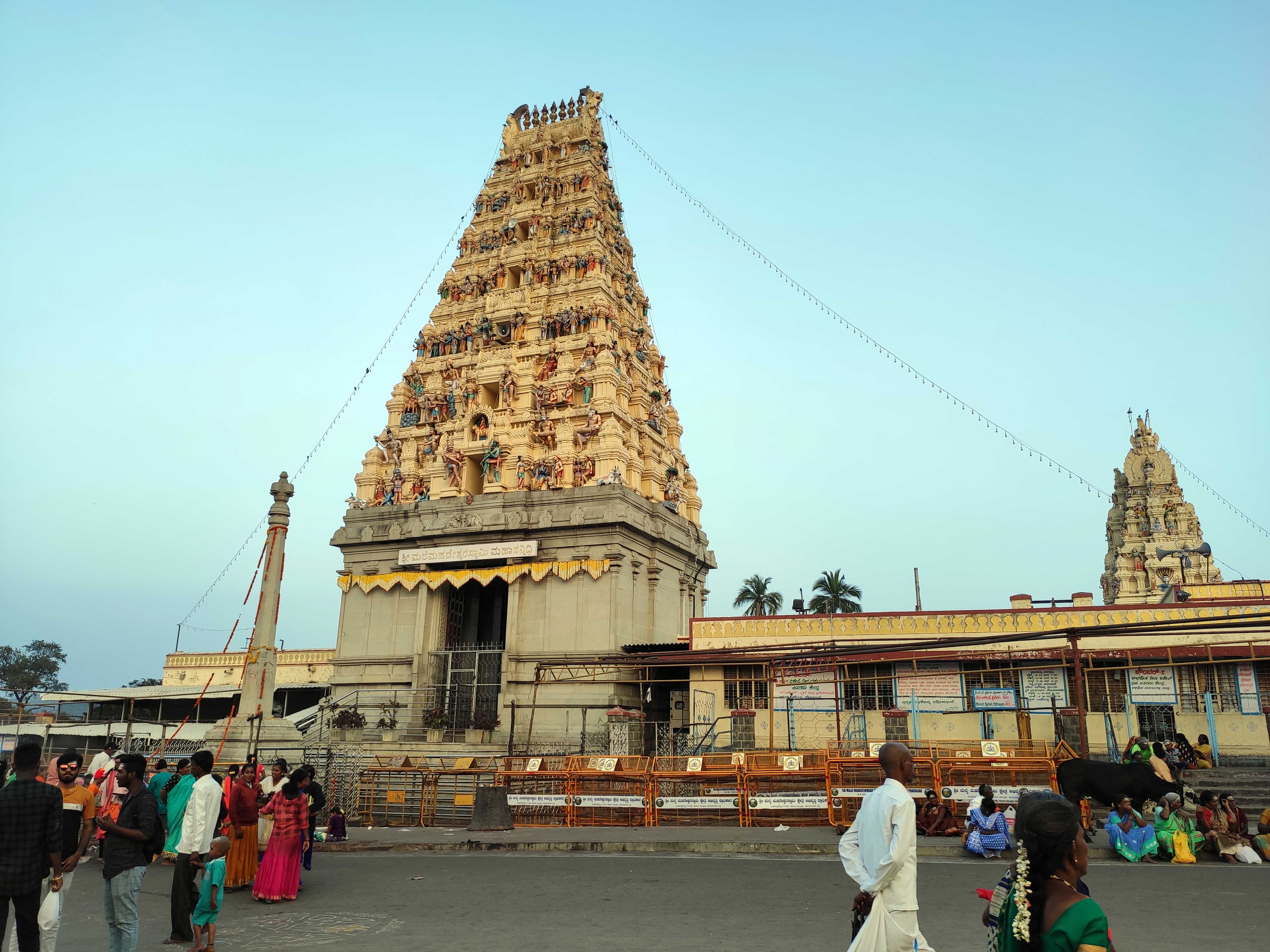
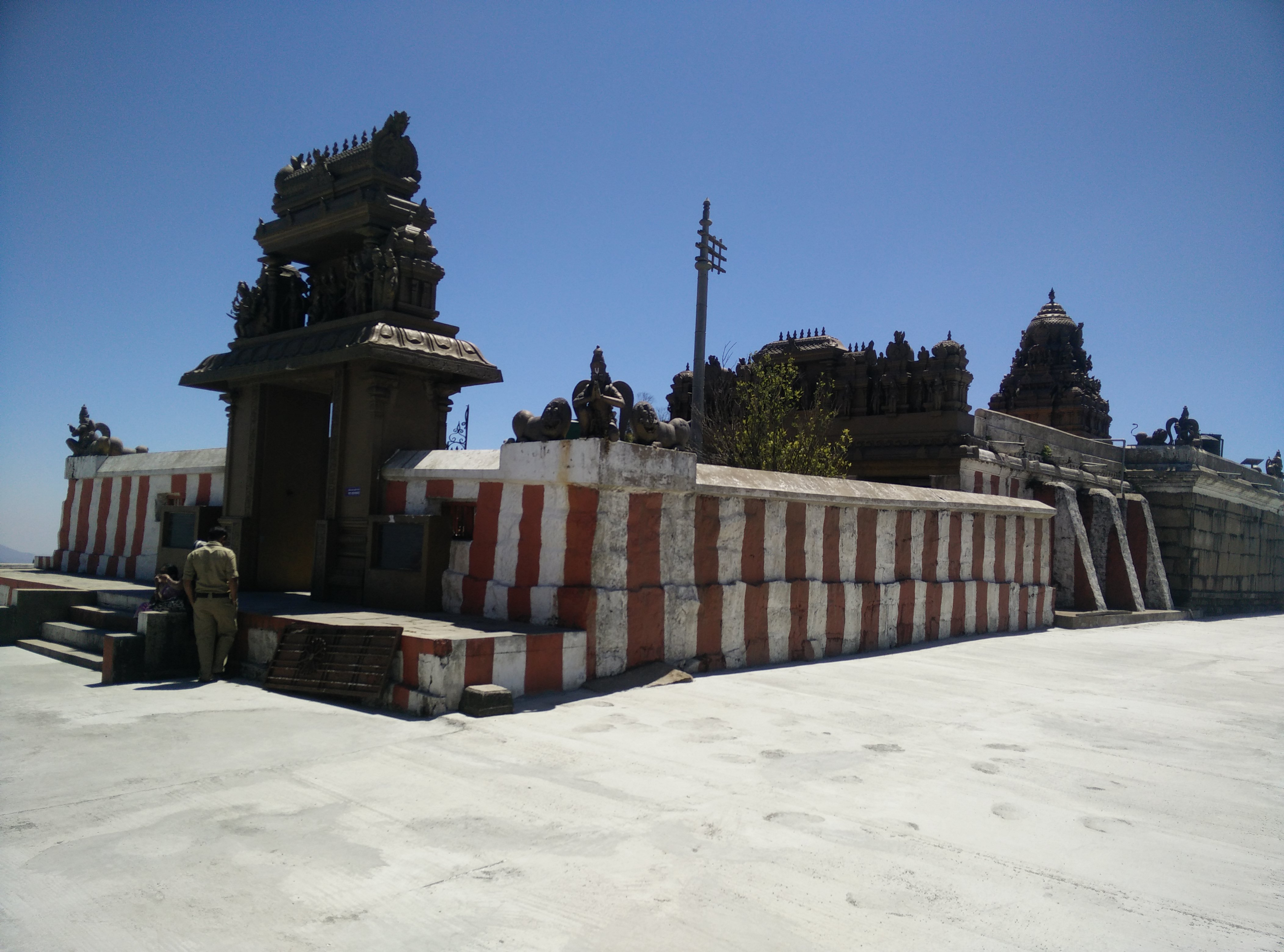
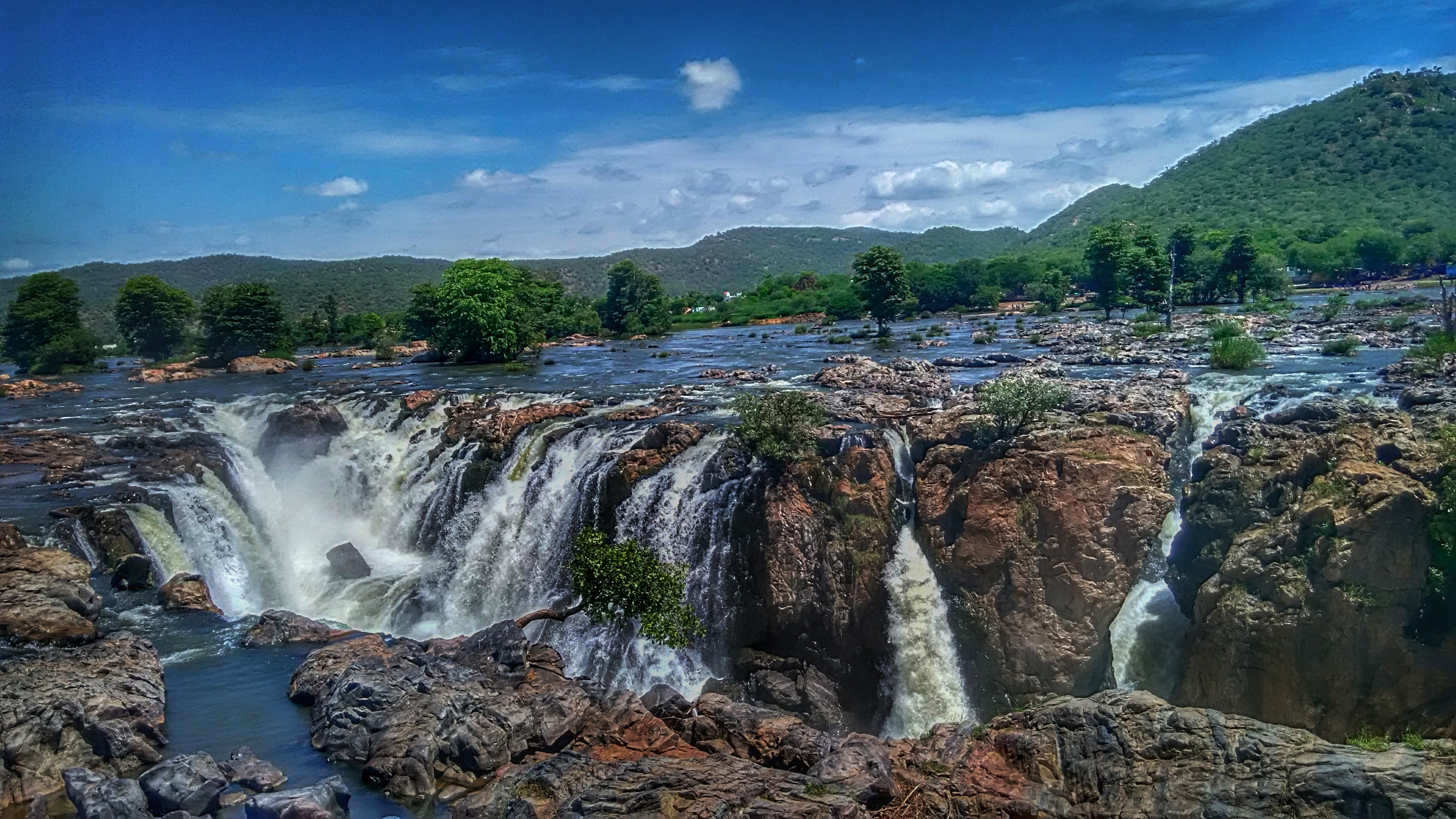
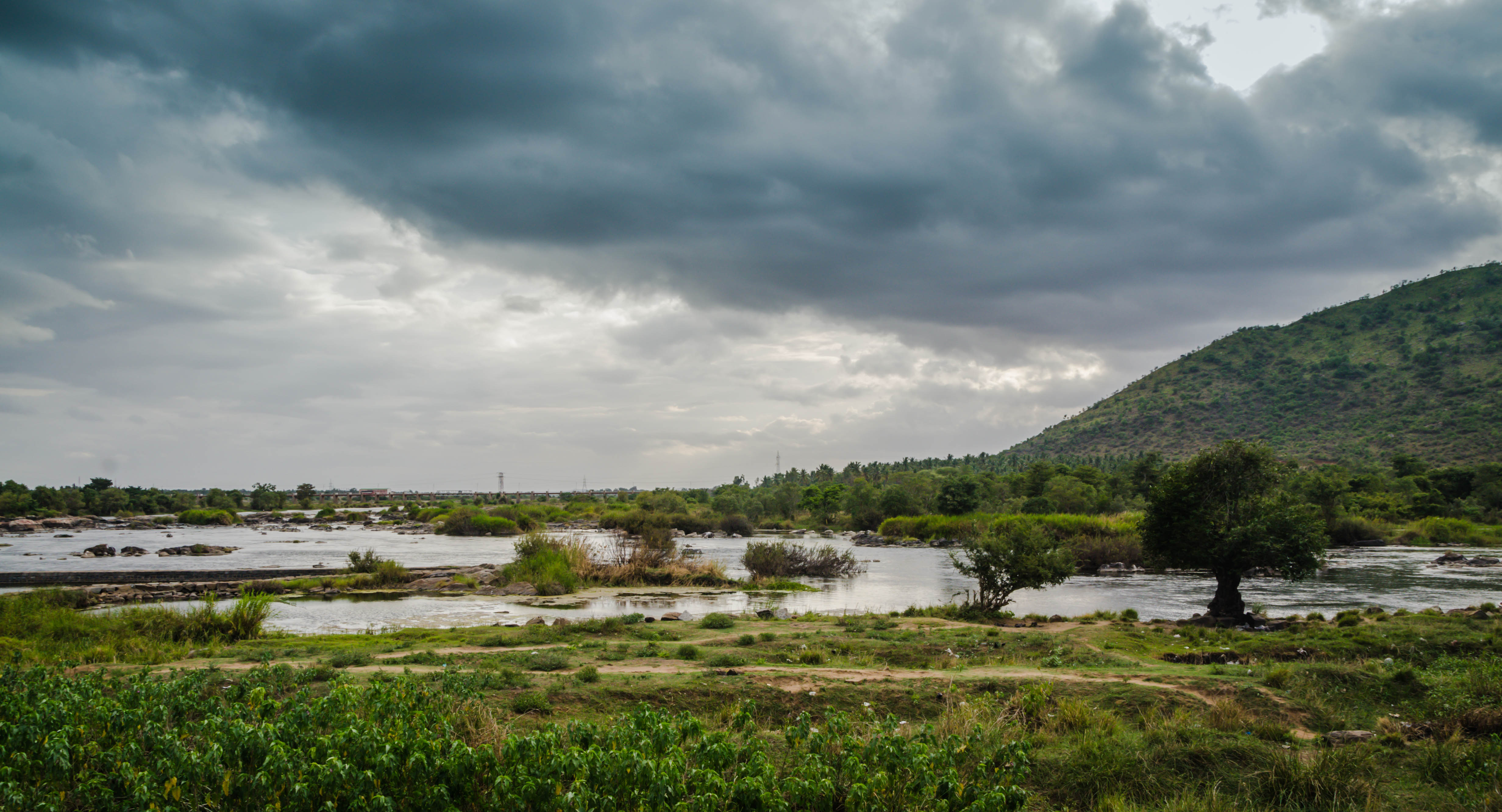
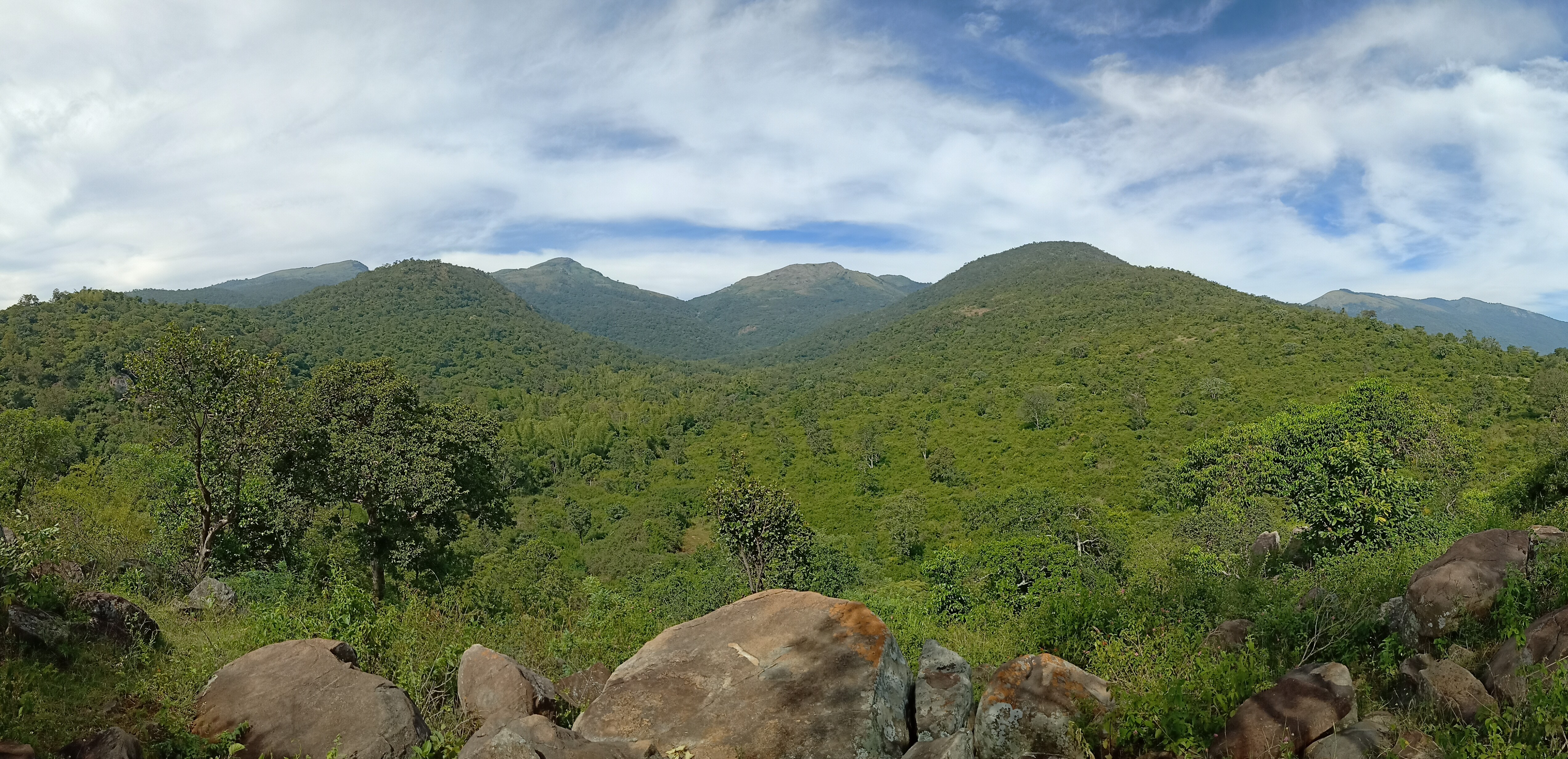
- MM Hills, Himavad Gopalaswamy Betta temple, Kaveri at Talakadu, BR Hills, Hogenakkal Falls
- Nickname: Silk City
- Interactive map of Chamarajanagar district
- Coordinates: 11.9260°N 76.9402°E
- Country: India
- State: Karnataka
- Headquarters: Chamarajanagar
- Taluks: Kollegal, Yelandur, Gundlupet, Chamarajanagar, Hanur

Government
  - District Commissioner & District Magistrate: Shilpa Nag C T, IAS
  - CEO: Mona Roat, IAS
  - District in-charge minister: K. Venkatesh

Area
  - Total: 5,101 km^{2} (1,970 sq mi)

Population (2011)
  - Total: 1,020,791
  - Density: 200/km^{2} (520/sq mi)

Languages
  - Official: Kannada
- Time zone: UTC+5:30 (IST)
- PIN: 571 313
- Telephone code: 08226
- ISO 3166 code: IN-KA
- Vehicle registration: Chamarajanagar KA-10
- Website: chamrajnagar.nic.in

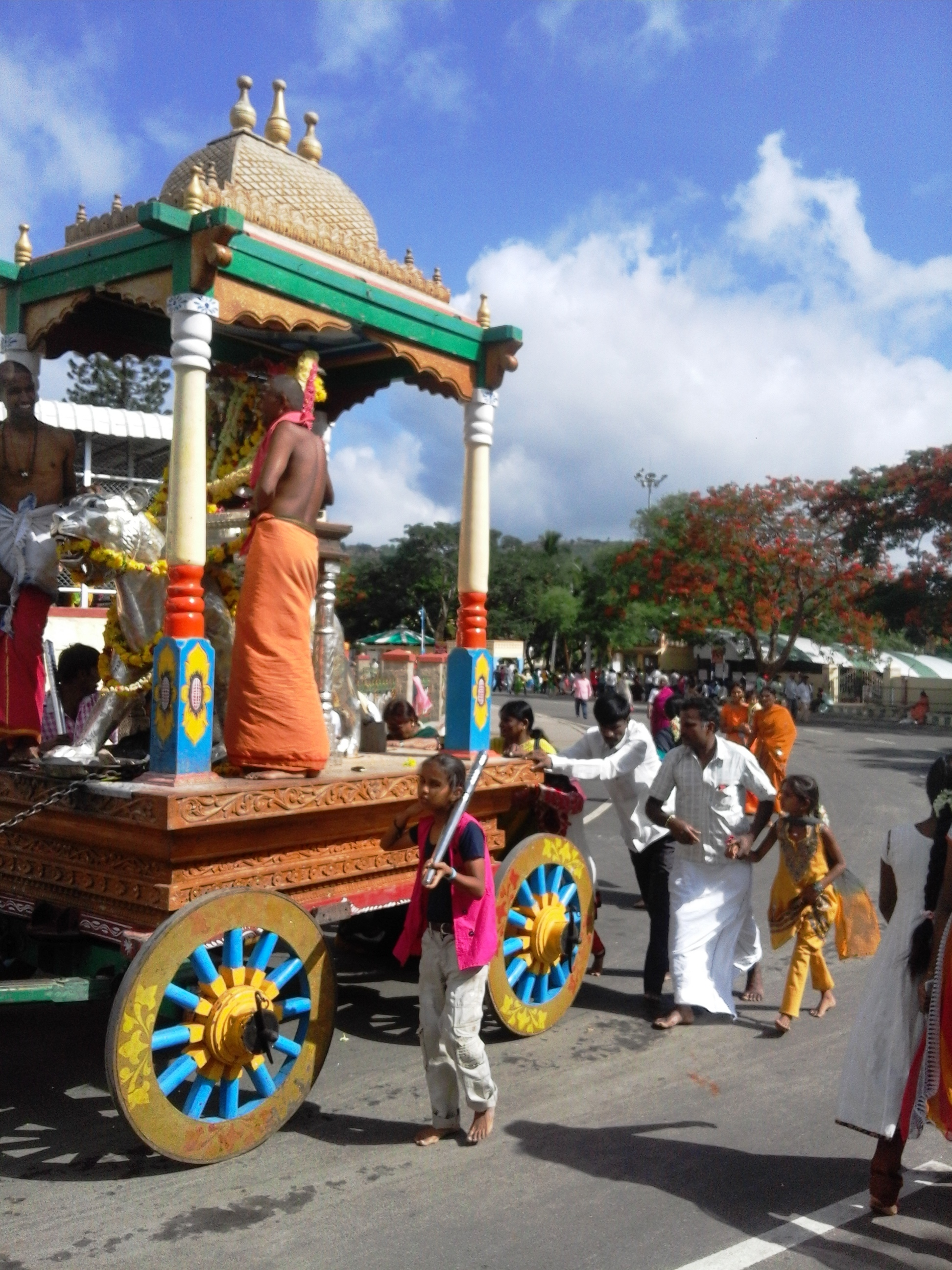
Temple chariot at M.M.Hills

Chamarajanagar district or Chamarajanagara is the southernmost district in the state of Karnataka, India. It was carved out of the original larger Mysore District on 15 August 1997. Chamarajanagar town is the headquarters of this district.

It is the third least populous district in Karnataka (out of 30), after Kodagu and Bangalore North district.

== History ==
Chamarajanagar was earlier known as Sri Arikottara. In 1825, Krishnaraja Wodeyar III built a large temple of Chamarajeshvara in Dravidian style in memory of his father Chamaraja Wodeyar IX. It is believed that Chamaraja Wodeyar IX, the Wodeyar of Mysuru, was born here, and hence this place was renamed after him.

== Geography ==
Being the southernmost district of Karnataka, Chamarajanagar district borders the state of Tamil Nadu and Kerala. Specifically, it borders Mysore district of Karnataka to the west and north, Mandya and Bengaluru South districts of Karnataka to the north-east, Dharmapuri and Krishnagiri districts of Tamil Nadu to the east, Salem to south-east, Erode districts and Nilgiris district of Tamil Nadu to the south, and to the extreme south-west, there is a very small border with Wayanad district of Kerala.

Most of the district lies in the leeward region of the Nilgiris and consists of mainly semi-arid rain-dependent flatlands along with forested hills.

== Demographics ==
Historical population
Year	Pop.	±% p.a.
1901	334,676	—
1911	344,414	+0.29%
1921	328,501	−0.47%
1931	352,485	+0.71%
1941	390,337	+1.03%
1951	449,448	+1.42%
1961	533,759	+1.73%
1971	616,502	+1.45%
1981	768,198	+2.22%
1991	883,365	+1.41%
2001	965,462	+0.89%
2011	1,020,791	+0.56%

Religions in Chamarajanagar district (2011)
Religion	Percent
Hinduism	92.29%
Islam	4.62%
Christianity	2.17%
Buddhism	0.48%
Other or not stated	0.44%

According to the 2011 census Chamarajanagar district has a population of 1,020,791, roughly equal to the nation of Cyprus or the US state of Montana. This gives it a ranking of 441st in India (out of a total of 640). The district has a population density of 200 inhabitants per square kilometre (520/sq mi) . Its population growth rate over the decade 2001-2011 was 5.75%. Chamarajanagar has a sex ratio of 989 females for every 1000 males, and a literacy rate of 61.43%. 17.14% of the population lives in urban areas. Scheduled Castes and Scheduled Tribes make up 25.42% and 11.78% of the population respectively.

The district has a high percentage of Scheduled Castes, with a population of 259,000, making up a quarter of the district's population. Having a large percentage of forest cover the district also has a high population of tribals, mostly the Nayakas but also forest tribes like the Soligas, Yeravas, Jenu Kurubas and Betta Kurubas. These tribals have their own languages and their total population is around 120,000, and make up 12% of the district population. Other communities include Lingayats, Muslims and Vokkaligas.

Languages of Chamarajanagar district (2011)
1. Kannada (86.1%)
2. Tamil (4.58%)
3. Urdu (4.42%)
4. Telugu (3.29%)
5. Others (1.60%)

At the time of the 2011 census, 86.10% of the population spoke Kannada, 4.58% Tamil, 4.42% Urdu and 3.29% Telugu as their first language.

=== Crime ===
Since much of the southern area of the district is dense forest, it provided good refuge to the notorious bandit Veerappan, responsible for the death of over a hundred policemen in both states of Karnataka and Tamil Nadu. He was shot dead in an encounter with the specially formed Special Task Force (STF) on 18 October 2004, in Dharmapuri district, Tamil Nadu. He had been on the run for over two decades. The presence of illegal quarrying for black stone imposes a great threat to the forests in the region.

== Tourist attractions ==
- Biligiriranga Hills
- Male Mahadeshwara Hills
- Suvarnavati Dam
- Hogenakal Falls
- Shivanasamudra Falls
- Bandipur National Park
- Gopalaswamy Hills

== Villages ==
- Cheluvanahalli

== Notable people ==
- Avinash, actor
- Mudnakudu Chinnaswamy, poet
- R. Dhruvanarayana, politician
- Nanjaiah Honganuru, noted folklorist and writer
- S. Mahendar, filmmaker
- Srinivasa Prasad, politician
- C. Puttarangashetty, politician
- B. Rachaiah, politician
- Dr. Rajkumar, actor
- B. S. Madhava Rao, mathematical physicist
- Samsa, first historical playwright in modern Kannada
- S. M. Siddaiah, lawyer and politician
- Veerappan, bandit and smuggler
