= Mappila dialects =

Dialect of Malayalam used by Mappila Muslims

Mappila Malayalam
- Mappila dialect
- മാപ്പിളമലയാളം
- Native to: India
- Native speakers: Malabar Muslims
- Language family: Dravidian: Southern; Southern I; Tamil–Kannada; Tamil–Kota; Tamil–Toda; Tamil–Irula; Tamil–Kodava–Urali; Tamil–Malayalam; Malayalamoid; Malayalam; Mappila Malayalam
- Early forms: Old Tamil: Middle Tamil
- Writing system: Malayalam script (currently); Arabi Malayalam script (historically)

Language codes
- ISO 639-3: –
- Glottolog: mopl1237

Mappila Malayalam (also called Moplah Malayalam) refers to the sociolects of the Malayalam language spoken by the Mappila Muslim community of Kerala, India. Rather than a single uniform dialect, the term encompasses a variety of regional speech patterns that differ significantly by district (e.g., Kasaragod, Malappuram, Kozhikode, Kannur). It is spoken by several million people, predominantly in the Malabar Coast of Kerala state, southern India.

Linguistically, Mappila Malayalam is mutually intelligible with other standard dialects of Malayalam. It is classified variously as a regional dialect of northern Kerala or as a sociolect of the Mappila community. It is also described as a vernacular or, particularly during the colonial era, as a provincial patois. A defining feature of Mappila Malayalam is its lexical admixture, which shows influence from Arabic and Persian.

== Writing system ==
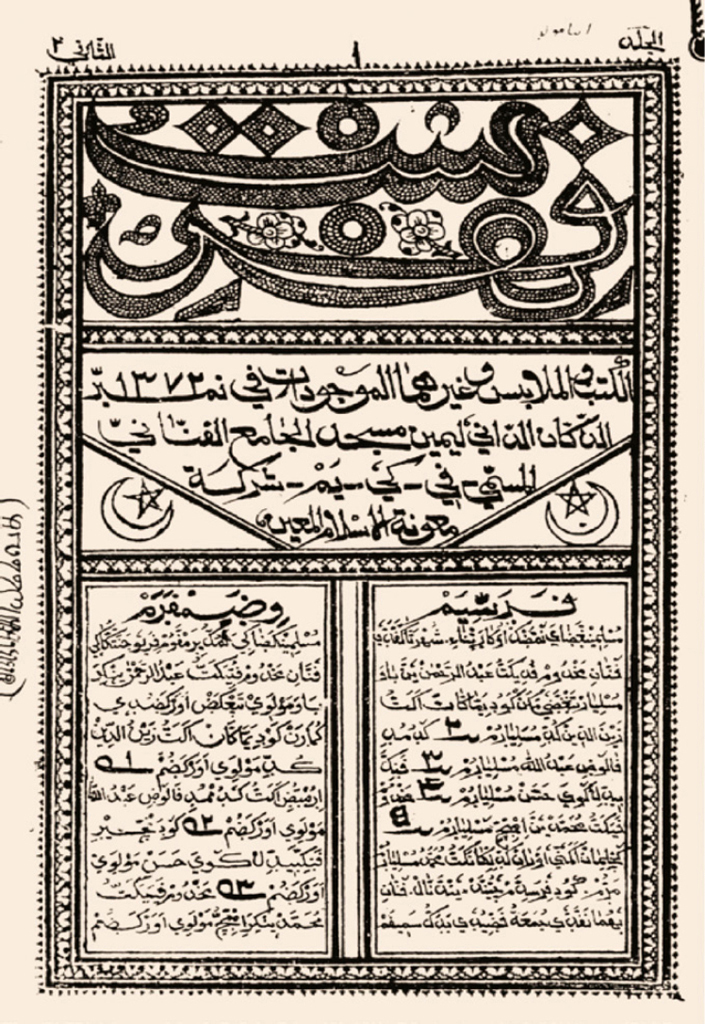
A multilingual advertisement with a catalogue of books and textiles available from a shop in Ponnani in 1908. Text on the left hand side is Arabi-Tamil, text on the right hand side, Arabi Malayalam script

The Arabi Malayalam script is a modified version of the Arabic script. The script is also known as Khatafunnani or Ponnani script. It is also used to write several minority languages such as Eranadan and Jesri.

Scholars debate the origins of the writing system. While some historians (e.g., O. Abu) argue Arabs developed it to bridge linguistic barriers, a prominent theory suggests it was developed by native Mappilas. Due to the belief that the Arabic script was divinely bestowed, early Mappilas considered it inappropriate to record sacred texts in local scripts like Vatteluttu, prompting the adaptation of the Arabic alphabet for Malayalam.

== Study center ==
The Thunchath Ezhuthachan Malayalam University in Tirur has established a centre dedicated to the study of the Arabi Malayalam literary tradition and the Mappila dialect.

== See also ==
- Arabi Malayalam script
- Suriyani Malayalam
- Arwi
- Byari bhashe
- Eranadan language
- Jeseri
