= Kongu Tamil =

Dialect of Tamil

- கொங்கு தமிழ்
- Pronunciation: Koṅku Tamil
- Native to: West part of Tamil Nadu and some parts of Karnataka, Kerala
- Region: Kongu Nadu
- Ethnicity: Kongu Vellalar and various other castes from Kongu Nadu
- Native speakers: (undated figure of ~25 million)
- Language family: Dravidian: Southern; Southern I; Tamil–Kannada; Tamil–Kota; Tamil–Toda; Tamil–Irula; Tamil–Kodava–Urali; Tamil–Malayalam; Tamiloid; Tamil–Paliyan; Tamil; Kongu Tamil
- Early forms: Old Tamil: Middle Tamil
- Writing system: Tamil script

Official status
- Official language in: India (Tamil Nadu)

Language codes
- ISO 639-3: –
- Glottolog: None
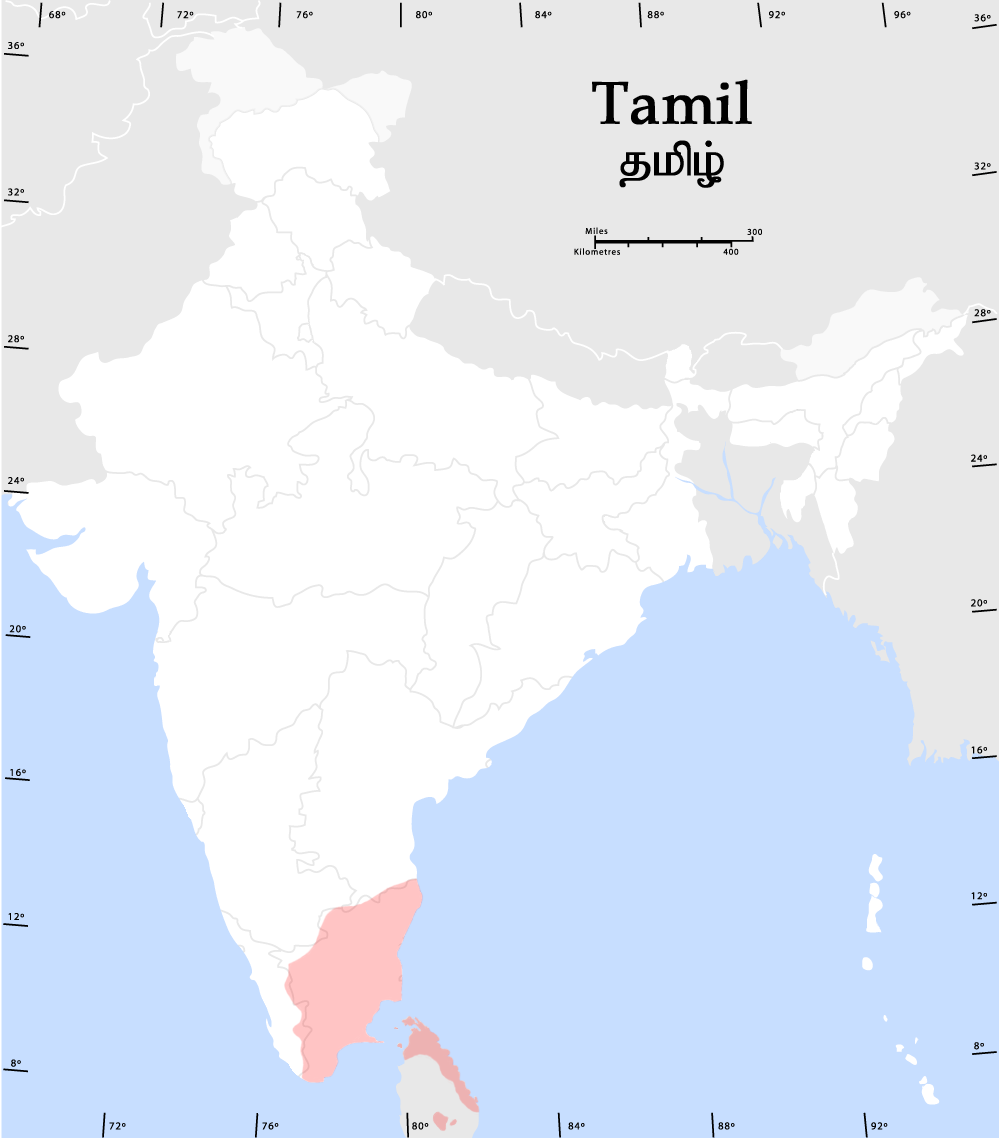
- Distribution of native Tamil speakers in India and Sri Lanka

Kongu Tamil (also called Kongalam, Kongu Pēchu) is the dialect of Tamil language that is spoken by the people in Kongu Nadu, which is the western region of Tamil Nadu. It is originally known as "Kangee"` or "Kongalam" or "Kongappechu".

Kongu Tamil is an ancient, geographically insulated branch of Old and Middle Tamil that preserves Sangam-era vocabulary and phonology alongside a rich agrarian lexicon rooted in the dryland plains of the upland plateau.

By 1809, early European lexicographers like William Simpson and later Severine Silva documented the speech of the region as "Kangee" (named after Kangeyam) or "Kongalam", noting that outsiders from the coast struggled to understand its rapid cadence and archaic lexicon.

== Variations ==
The speciality of Kongu Tamil is the use of the alveolar ற - Tra/Dra (as in the English word track) instead of retroflex T/D (ட) of standard Tamil. For example, 'ennuDaiya' (mine) of standard Tamil is pronounced enRa in the Kongu dialect. Kongu Tamil shares close affinity with the Mysuru Kannada language. This dialect of Tamil also uses many loan words from Kannada language.

Additionally the use of guttural nasal (ங்) that sounds "ng" as in the English word Gang, is more prevalent in Kongu Tamil, leading to situations where the grammar of Kongu Tamil would not fit into the grammar of standard Tamil. One of the examples is the use of ங் to end a word like வாங் "vaang" or வாஙொ "vango" means 'come' expressed in a respectful tone, which in Standard Indian Vernacular Tamil would be வாங்க "vaanga". Both of these are stereotyping Kongalam with regional, professional variations.

Kongu Tamil contains huge vocabulary of certain Tamil words that are archaic to Kongu region and are not used in other dialects of modern Tamil.

== See also ==
- Kongu Nadu, region in South India
- Kongu Vellalar, community in South India
- Coimbatore, metropolis in Tamil Nadu, India
