= Malaysian Tamil =

Tamil variety of Malaysia and Singapore

- Bahasa Tamil Malaysia
- மலேசியத் தமிழ் மொழி ماليسيات تاميه موهي
- Native to: Malaysia, Singapore and other parts of Southeast Asia
- Ethnicity: Malaysian Indian (Tamil Malaysians), Singaporean Indian, Brunei Indians
- Native speakers: ~1.9 million in Malaysia and Singapore (2006 – 2010 census)
- Language family: Dravidian: Southern; Southern I; Tamil–Kannada; Tamil–Kota; Tamil–Toda; Tamil–Irula; Tamil–Kodava–Urali; Tamil–Malayalam; Tamiloid; Tamil–Paliyan; Tamil; Malaysian Tamil
- Early forms: Old Tamil: Middle Tamil
- Writing system: Pallava script (Tamil alphabet); Arabic script (Jawi alphabet)

Official status
- Regulated by: Malaysian Tamil Language Standardisation Council

Language codes
- ISO 639-3: –
- Glottolog: mala1467

Malaysian Tamil (மலேசியத் தமிழ் மொழி, ماليسيات تاميه موهي, Malēsiyat Tamiḻ Moḻi), also known as Malaya Tamil, is a local variant of the Tamil language spoken in Malaysia. It is one of the languages of education in Malaysia, along with English, Malay and Mandarin. There are many differences in vocabulary between Malaysian Tamil and Indian Tamil.

== Influence ==
An element needed to carry out commercial transactions is a common language understood by all parties involved in early trade. Historians such as J.V. Sebastian, K.T. Thirunavukkarasu, and A.W. Hamilton record that Tamil was the common language of commerce in Malaysia and Indonesia during historical times. The maritime Tamil significance in Sumatran and Malay Peninsula trading continued for centuries and borrowings into Malay from Tamil increased between the 15th and 19th centuries due to their commercial activities. In the 17th century, the Dutch East India Company was obliged to use Tamil as part of its correspondence. In Malacca and other seaports up to the 19th century, Malay terminology pertaining to book-keeping and accountancy was still largely Tamil.

Borrowings into Malay from Tamil (sometimes Sanskritized) include such everyday words as:

Tamil	Malay	English
அநியாயம் aniyāyam	aniaya	persecute, misjustice
கடை kaṭai	kedai	shop
கடை kaṭai	gadai	pawn
கப்பல் kappal	kapal	ship
கோட்டம் kōṭṭam	kota	city
சதை catai	sate	satay
சுங்கம் cuṅkam	cukai	tax
சுசி cuci	cuci	to clean/wash
சும்மா cummā	cuma	only/merely
சொர்க்கம் corkkam	syurga	heaven/paradise
சௌத்து cauttu	contoh	example
நகரம் nakaram	negara	city
பூமி pūmi	bumi	earth
மாமா māmā	mamak	Tamil Muslim
முத்து muttu	mutiara	pearl
ரகசியம் rakaciyam	rahsia	secret
ரொட்டி roṭṭi	roti	bread
வகை vakai	bagai	variety/type
வர்ணம் varṇam	warna	colours

== Differences with Indian Tamil ==
Malaysian Tamil	Indian Tamil	English	Notes
காடி kāṭi	வண்டி vaṇṭi வாகனம் vākaṇam	car	based on ਗੱਡੀ (gaḍḍī) from Punjabi
சப்பாத்து cappāttu	செருப்பு ceruppu	shoe	
கோசம் kōcam	பூஜ்யம் pūjyam	zero	based on kosong, which means empty in Malay
ஆமாவா āmāvā	அப்படியா appaṭiyā	really	
மின்னிக்கு miṉṉikku	முன்னாடி muṉṉāṭi முன்னால் muṉṉāl	before	
கூட்டாளி kūṭṭāḷi	நண்பர் naṇpar	friend	
பாய்கிறது pāykiraṭu	உபயோகிக்கிறது upayōkikkiraṭu	to use	
பசியாறை pasiyāṟai	காலை உணவு kālai uṇavu	breakfast	
அஞ்செடி añceṭi	வாசல் vācal	entrance	
தே தாரிக் thē thārik தே தண்ணி thē taṇṇi	தேநீர் thēnīr	tea	based on teh and tarik from Malay, which translates to "pulled tea"

== Sources ==
- Andronov, M.S. (1970), Dravidian Languages, Nauka Publishing House
- Annamalai, E.; Steever, S.B. (1998), "Modern Tamil", in Steever, Sanford (ed.), The Dravidian Languages, London: Routledge, pp. 100–128, ISBN 0-415-10023-2
- Caldwell, Robert (1974), A comparative grammar of the Dravidian or South-Indian family of languages, New Delhi: Oriental Books Reprint Corp.
- Hart, George L. (1975), The poems of ancient Tamil : their milieu and their Sanskrit counterparts, Berkeley: University of California Press, ISBN 0-520-02672-1
- Krishnamurti, Bhadriraju (2003), The Dravidian Languages, Cambridge Language Surveys, Cambridge University Press, ISBN 0-521-77111-0
- Kesavapany, K.; Mani, A; Ramasamy, Palanisamy (2008), Rising India and Indian Communities in East Asia, Singapore: Institute of Southeast Asian Studies, ISBN 978-981-230-799-6
- Lehmann, Thomas (1998), "Old Tamil", in Steever, Sanford (ed.), The Dravidian Languages, London: Routledge, pp. 75–99, ISBN 0-415-10023-2
- Mahadevan, Iravatham (2003), Early Tamil Epigraphy from the Earliest Times to the Sixth Century A.D, Harvard Oriental Series vol. 62, Cambridge, Massachusetts: Harvard University Press, ISBN 0-674-01227-5
- Meenakshisundaran, T.P. (1965), A History of Tamil Language, Poona: Deccan College
- Murthy, Srinivasa; Rao, Surendra; Veluthat, Kesavan; Bari, S.A. (1990), Essays on Indian History and culture: Felicitation volume in Honour of Professor B. Sheik Ali, New Delhi: Mittal, ISBN 81-7099-211-7
- Ramstedt, Martin (2004), Hinduism in modern Indonesia, London: Routledge, ISBN 0-7007-1533-9
- Rajam, VS (1992), A Reference Grammar of Classical Tamil Poetry, Philadelphia: The American Philosophical Society, ISBN 0-87169-199-X
- Ramaswamy, Sumathy (1997), "Laboring for language", Passions of the Tongue: Language Devotion in Tamil India, 1891–1970, Berkeley: University of California Press, ISBN 0-585-10600-2
- Shapiro, Michael C.; Schiffman, Harold F. (1983), Language and society in South Asia, Dordrecht: Foris, ISBN 90-70176-55-6
- Schiffman, Harold F. (1999), A Reference Grammar of Spoken Tamil, Cambridge: Cambridge University Press, ISBN 0-521-64074-1
- Southworth, Franklin C. (1998), "On the Origin of the word tamiz", International Journal of Dravidian Linguistics, 27 (1): 129–132
- Southworth, Franklin C. (2005), Linguistic archaeology of South Asia, Routledge, ISBN 0-415-33323-7
- Steever, Sanford (1998), "Introduction", in Steever, Sanford (ed.), The Dravidian Languages, London: Routledge, pp. 1–39, ISBN 0-415-10023-2
- Steever, Sanford (2005), The Tamil auxiliary verb system, London: Routledge, ISBN 0-415-34672-X
- Tharu, Susie; Lalita, K., eds. (1991), Women Writing in India: 600 B.C. to the present – Vol. 1: 600 B.C. to the early twentieth century, Feminist Press, ISBN 1-55861-027-8
- Talbot, Cynthia (2001), Precolonial India in practice: Society, Region and Identity in Medieval Andhra, New York: Oxford University Press, ISBN 0-19-513661-6
- Tieken, Herman (2001), Kavya in South India: Old Tamil Cankam Poetry, Gonda Indological Studies, Volume X, Groningen: Egbert Forsten Publishing, ISBN 90-6980-134-5
- Varadarajan, Mu. (1988), A History of Tamil Literature, New Delhi: Sahitya Akademi (Translated from Tamil by E.Sa. Viswanathan)
- Zvelebil, Kamil (1992), Companion studies to the history of Tamil literature, Leiden: Brill, ISBN 90-04-09365-6
