= Mala Malasar language =

Language

Mala Malasar
- Native to: India
- Native speakers: 1,000 (2004)
- Language family: Dravidian: Southern; Southern I; Tamil–Kannada; Tamil–Kota; Tamil–Toda; Tamil–Irula; Tamil–Kodava–Urali; Tamil–Malayalam; Tamiloid; Mala Malasar
- Early forms: Old Tamil: Middle Tamil

Language codes
- ISO 639-3: ima
- Glottolog: mala1457

Mala Malasar (IPA: [mɐlɐ mɐlɐsɐr]) is a Southern Dravidian language spoken by a scheduled tribe of India. It is close to Irula and classified as a Tamiloid language, sometimes as a dialect of Tamil.
