= Thachanadan language =

Southern Dravidian language of India

Thachanadan
- Native to: India
- Native speakers: 3,000 (2004 survey)
- Language family: Dravidian: Southern; Southern I; Tamil–Kannada; Tamil–Kota; Tamil–Toda; Tamil–Irula; Tamil–Kodava–Urali; Tamil–Malayalam; Malayalamoid; Thachanadan
- Early forms: Old Tamil: Middle Tamil

Language codes
- ISO 639-3: thn
- Glottolog: thac1235

Thachanadan (IPA: [t̪ɐt͡ːʃɐnaːɖɐn]) is a Southern Dravidian language spoken by Thachanad Muppans tribe of India. Dissimilar to other Dravidian languages, its most likely affinities are to Mullu Kurumba, with which it has 66-72% lexical similarity.
