= Yerukala language =

Dravidian language of South India

Yerukala
- ఎరుకల
- Region: South India
- Ethnicity: 519,337 Yerukala (2011 census)
- Native speakers: 58,065, 11% of ethnic population (2011 census) (2011 census)
- Language family: Dravidian: Southern; Southern I; Tamil–Kannada; Tamil–Kota; Tamil–Toda; Tamil–Irula; Tamil–Kodava–Urali; Tamil–Malayalam; Tamiloid; Yerukula–Korava–Kaikadi; Yerukala
- Early forms: Old Tamil: Middle Tamil

Language codes
- ISO 639-3: yeu
- Glottolog: yeru1240

Yerukula (IPA: [jerukɐlɐ]), also called Kurru Basha or Kulavatha, is a Dravidian language mainly spoken by the Yerukala tribe. Yerukala is linguistically close to South Dravidian languages such as Ravula and Irula. Lexical similarity among these languages ranges from 53% to 81%; in the case of Irula, it varies from 33% to 38%; in case of Ravula, it varies from 28% to 45%; in case of modern Tamil, it varies from 27% to 45%.

Sathupati Prasanna Sree has developed a unique script for use with the language.

Some of the language terms, mostly relations (kinship terms).

English	Kurru	English	Kurru	English	Kurru
Father	Aava	Father's Father	Jejaava	Father's Mother	Jeji
Mother	Amma	Mother's Father	Tata	Mother's Mother	Ammamma
Son	Momu	Elder Brother	Berannu	Younger Brother	Thenbhi
Daughter	Maga	Elder Sister	Berukka	Younger Sister	Thangisee
Grand Daughter	Pethi	Grand Son	Pyathu	Father's Sister	Atta
Elder Sister-in-law	Nanga	Younger Sister-in-law	Merchenchi	Uncle	Mama
