= Malamuthan language =

Dravidian language of India

Malamuthan
- Malakkar
- Native to: Kerala, India
- Region: Malappuram, Kozhikode
- Ethnicity: Malamuthan
- Language family: Dravidian: Southern; Southern I; Tamil–Kannada; Tamil–Kota; Tamil–Toda; Tamil–Irula; Tamil–Kodava–Urali; Tamil–Malayalam; Malayalamoid; Malamuthan
- Early forms: Old Tamil: Middle Tamil

Language codes
- ISO 639-3: –

Malamuthaan (IPA: [mɐlɐmut̪ːɐn]) also called Malakkaar (IPA: [mɐlɐkːaːr]) is a Southern Dravidian language spoken by the Malamuthan people in the hills of the Malappuram and Kozhikode districts of Kerala. Previously they were falsely labeled as Muthuvan in documents but they are a different tribe in Idukki.
