= Malankuravan language =

Dravidian language of southern India

Malankuravan
- Native to: India
- Region: Kerala, Tamil Nadu
- Native speakers: (19,000 cited 2001 census)
- Language family: Dravidian: Southern; Southern I; Tamil–Kannada; Tamil–Kota; Tamil–Toda; Tamil–Irula; Tamil–Kodava–Urali; Tamil–Malayalam; Malayalamoid; Malankuravan
- Early forms: Old Tamil: Middle Tamil

Language codes
- ISO 639-3: mjo
- Glottolog: mala1459

Malankuravan (Mala Koravan, Malakkuravan, IPA: [mɐlɐŋɡurɐʋɐn]) is an unclassified Dravidian language of southern India, on the southern border of Kerala and Tamil Nadu. It may be a dialect of Malayalam with Tamil influence or a language closely related to Malayalam.
