= Malaryan language =

Extinct Dravidian language of India

Malaryan
- മലർയൻ
- Native to: India
- Region: Kerala, Tamil Nadu
- Ethnicity: 35,000 (2001 census)
- Extinct: 2000s
- Language family: Dravidian: Southern; Southern I; Tamil–Kannada; Tamil–Kota; Tamil–Toda; Tamil–Irula; Tamil–Kodava–Urali; Tamil–Malayalam; Malayalamoid; Malaryan
- Early forms: Old Tamil: Middle Tamil

Language codes
- ISO 639-3: mjq
- Glottolog: mala1466

Malaryan (Mala Arayan, Malayarayar, IPA: [mɐlɐrjɐn]) is an extinct Dravidian language of Kerala and Tamil Nadu that was closely related to Malayalam.
