= Vishavan language =

Malayalamoid language of India

Vishavan
- വിശ്വാസൻ
- Native to: India
- Region: Kerala
- Native speakers: (150 cited 1994)
- Language family: Dravidian: Southern; Southern I; Tamil–Kannada; Tamil–Kota; Tamil–Toda; Tamil–Irula; Tamil–Kodava–Urali; Tamil–Malayalam; Malayalamoid; Vishavan
- Early forms: Old Tamil: Middle Tamil

Language codes
- ISO 639-3: vis
- Glottolog: vish1243
- ELP: Vishavan

Vishavan (IPA: [ʋiʃaːʋɐn]) is a Dravidian language spoken by a tribal people of central Kerala in India.

VIshavan is a tribal community of Kerala, they are settled in Idamalyar region of Ernakulam District and Vazhachal region of Thrissur District. As per the government records they are endangered but they are still living this area.
