= Wayanad Chetti language =

Malayalamoid language spoken in India

Wayanad Chetti
- വയനാട് ചെറ്റി
- Native to: India
- Native speakers: 5,000 (2004)
- Language family: Dravidian: Southern; Southern I; Tamil–Kannada; Tamil–Kota; Tamil–Toda; Tamil–Irula; Tamil–Kodava–Urali; Tamil–Malayalam; Malayalamoid; Wayanad Chetti
- Early forms: Old Tamil: Middle Tamil
- Writing system: Tamil script

Language codes
- ISO 639-3: ctt
- Glottolog: waya1264

Wayanad Chetti (IPA: [ʋɐjɐnaːɖə̆ t͡ʃeʈːi]), or Chetti, is a Southern Dravidian language of India spoken by Wayanadan Chetti community in the Wayanad district of Kerala, India. It has 62-76% lexical similarity with Gowder, 65% with Jen Kurumba and 52% with Kannada. Kannada is the closest major language. Their language is also very similar to Badaga.
