= Malavedan language =

Dravidian language of Kerala and Tamil Nadu

Malavedan
- മലവേടൻ
- Native to: India
- Region: Kerala, Tamil Nadu
- Ethnicity: Ethnic population: 33,000 (2011 census)
- Native speakers: 27,000 (2011 census)
- Language family: Dravidian: Southern; Southern I; Tamil–Kannada; Tamil–Kota; Tamil–Toda; Tamil–Irula; Tamil–Kodava–Urali; Tamil–Malayalam; Malayalamoid; Malavedan
- Early forms: Old Tamil: Middle Tamil

Language codes
- ISO 639-3: mjr
- Glottolog: mala1463

Malavedan (Malai Vedan, IPA: [mɐlɐʋeːɖɐn]) is a Dravidian language of Kerala and Tamil Nadu that is closely related to Malayalam. Malavedan speakers are one of the tribal groups in Kerala. Many of them live in the Ernakulam, Kollam, Kottayam, Idukki, Pathanamthitta, and Thiruvananthapuram districts.
