= Karintamil =

Predecessor of the Malayalam language

- கரிந்தமிழ் കരിന്തമിഴ്
- Region: Ancient Kerala, India
- Language family: Dravidian: Southern; Southern I; Tamil–Kannada; Tamil–Kota; Tamil–Toda; Tamil–Irula; Tamil–Kodava–Urali; Tamil–Malayalam; Malayalamoid; Karintamil
- Writing system: Tamil-Brahmi, later Vaṭṭeḻuttu

Language codes
- ISO 639-3: –
- Glottolog: None

Karintamil is a term used to refer to the western coastal dialect of Middle Tamil spoken in ancient Kerala until the 9th century CE or possibly later. It is thought to be the earliest predecessor of the modern Malayalam language. The Sangam literature can be considered as the ancient predecessor of Malayalam.

The term Karintamil was first coined by T. K. Krishna Menon in his 1939 book "A Primer of Malayalam Literature". Menon proposed that Karintamil was spoken in Kerala between 3100 BCE and 100 BCE and was distinct from the Tamil spoken in neighboring kingdoms.

However, the concept of Karintamil has been largely rejected by mainstream linguistics. Critics view it as a term with propagandist and ideologically driven nature.

The oldest available inscription in Old Malayalam, the Quilon Syrian copper plates (dated to 850 CE), is itself debated by scholars. Many linguists regard the language of these Chera Perumal inscriptions (early Kerala rulers) as a diverging dialect or variety of Middle Tamil, not a separate language.

This late date for the oldest inscription believed to be in Old Malayalam (850 CE) further weakens the case for its proposed predecessor, Karintamil, especially considering the proposed timeline of 3100 BCE to 100 BCE. Additionally, the complete lack of any concrete evidence for a separate language predating Middle Tamil in Kerala leads most linguists to reject the concept of Karintamil entirely.

The earliest records in Karintamil are claimed to be the pattu literature (songs). Prominent were songs praising the goddesses of the land, ballads of brave warriors, songs related to the work of a particular caste and songs intended just for entertainment, including compositions by Kulasekhara Alvar (9th century CE) and Pakkanar.
