= Kadar language =

Dravidian language of Kerala and Tamil Nadu

Kadar
- Native to: India
- Region: Kerala, Tamil Nadu
- Ethnicity: 2,000 Kadar
- Native speakers: 2,000 (2004 survey)
- Language family: Dravidian: Southern; Southern I; Tamil–Kannada; Tamil–Kota; Tamil–Toda; Tamil–Irula; Tamil–Kodava–Urali; Tamil–Malayalam; Tamiloid; Kadar
- Early forms: Old Tamil: Middle Tamil

Language codes
- ISO 639-3: kej
- Glottolog: kada1242

Kadar (IPA: [kaːɖɐr]), also written in scholarly literature as Kada, Kadan and Kadir, is a Dravidian language of Kerala and Tamil Nadu that is closely related to Malayalam. It is spoken by the Kadar people.

== Classification ==
Scholars have placed Kadar, in the classification of the Dravidian languages, close to Malayalam, with some viewing it as an independent language and others as a dialect of Malayalam.

== Modern status ==
The language is critically endangered and at risk of disappearing forever due to speakers shifting to regional languages such as Tamil or Malayalam.
