= Ullatan language =

Malayalamoid language of India

Ullatan
- Kochu Velan
- Native to: India
- Ethnicity: 16,700 Ulladan (2001 census)
- Extinct: 1990s
- Language family: Dravidian: Southern; Southern I; Tamil–Kannada; Tamil–Kota; Tamil–Toda; Tamil–Irula; Tamil–Kodava–Urali; Tamil–Malayalam; Malayalamoid; Ullatan
- Early forms: Old Tamil: Middle Tamil

Language codes
- ISO 639-3: ull
- Glottolog: ulla1237

Ullatan (IPA: [uɭːaːɖɐn]) is an apparently extinct Southern Dravidian language once spoken by two Scheduled tribes of India. Ullatan is also known as Katan, Kattalan, Kochuvelan and Ulladan. Speakers shifted to Malayalam.
