= Malapandaram language =

Dravidian language of India

Malapandaram
- Native to: India
- Region: Kerala, Tamil Nadu
- Native speakers: (5,900 cited 2001 census)
- Language family: Dravidian: Southern; Southern I; Tamil–Kannada; Tamil–Kota; Tamil–Toda; Tamil–Irula; Tamil–Kodava–Urali; Tamil–Malayalam; Tamiloid; Malapandaram
- Early forms: Old Tamil: Middle Tamil

Language codes
- ISO 639-3: mjp
- Glottolog: mala1468

Malapandaram (IPA: [mɐlɐpːɐɳɖaːrɐm]) is a Dravidian language of Kerala and Tamil Nadu that is closely related to Tamil. This is the language of the Malappandaram tribe, who live in the forest areas of Tamil Nadu and Kerala.
