= Kurichiya language =

Southern Dravidian language of India

Kurichiya
- Native to: India
- Ethnicity: Kurichiya
- Native speakers: 29,000 (2004)
- Language family: Dravidian: Southern; Southern I; Tamil–Kannada; Tamil–Kota; Tamil–Toda; Tamil–Irula; Tamil–Kodava–Urali; Tamil–Malayalam; Malayalamoid; Kurichiya
- Early forms: Old Tamil: Middle Tamil
- Dialects: Kunnam; Wayanad

Language codes
- ISO 639-3: kfh
- Glottolog: kuri1256
- ELP: Kurichiya

Kurichiya (IPA: [kurit͡ʃjɐ]) is a Southern Dravidian language spoken by the Kurichiya, a Scheduled tribe of India. The two dialects, Kunnam and Wayanad, are no closer to each other than they are to Malayalam. The Kurichiya language has 27 identified phonemes, of which 5 are vowels and 22 are consonants. Frequent consonants include /p, t, c, k/ and /m, n/, while /b, v/ occur less frequently.

== Sources ==
- "Did you know Kurichiya is endangered?". Endangered Languages.
