= Pattapu language =

Dravidian language of India

Pattapu
- పట్టపు
- Native to: India
- Native speakers: 200,000 or more (2013)
- Language family: Dravidian: Southern; Southern I; Tamil–Kannada; Tamil–Kota; Tamil–Toda; Tamil–Irula; Tamil–Kodava–Urali; Tamil–Malayalam; Tamiloid; Yerukula–Korava–Kaikadi; Pattapu
- Early forms: Old Tamil: Middle Tamil
- Writing system: none

Language codes
- ISO 639-3: ptq
- Glottolog: patt1247 Pattapu

Pattapu (IPA: [pɐʈːɐpu]) is a described Dravidian language of Andhra Pradesh.

Pattapu is spoken by a coastal community in Southern Andhra Pradesh, India. They are listed as an Other Backward Class.

They mostly live in the coastal areas of Nellore, Prakasam and Bapatla districts. The people that speak the language belong to 146 different villages. The language is closely related to Tamil but also has influences of Telugu.

Most of their villages have a temple dedicated to Lord Sriram.

According to Ramayana: one person from this caste was helped by Lord Sriram to cross the river in search of Ma Site Devi. Lord Sriram promised that person that he will be worshipped by that person's caste (pattapu kapu).

They are mostly dependent on hunting, fishing and agriculture.
