= Muthuvan language =

Dravidian language of India

Muthuvan
- முதுவன்
- Native to: India
- Region: Kerala, Tamil Nadu, Andhra Pradesh
- Ethnicity: Muthuvan
- Native speakers: 17,000 (2006)
- Language family: Dravidian: Southern; Southern I; Tamil–Kannada; Tamil–Kota; Tamil–Toda; Tamil–Irula; Tamil–Kodava–Urali; Tamil–Malayalam; Tamiloid; Muthuvan–Mannan; Muthuvan
- Early forms: Old Tamil: Middle Tamil
- Writing system: Malayalam script, Tamil script

Language codes
- ISO 639-3: muv
- Glottolog: muth1236

Muthuvan (IPA: [mud̪uʋaːn]) is a tribal Dravidian language related to Tamil, mainly spoken in the Pooyamkutty-Idamalayar Dam region in Ernakulam district of Kerala by the Muthuvan people.
