= Allar language =

Dravidian language of India

Allar, Chatan
- അള്ളാർ,ചാത്തൻ
- Native to: India
- Region: Palakkad, Malappuram districts, Kerala State
- Native speakers: (350 cited 1994)
- Language family: Dravidian: Southern; Southern I; Tamil–Kannada; Tamil–Kota; Tamil–Toda; Tamil–Irula; Tamil–Kodava–Urali; Tamil–Malayalam; Malayalamoid; Allar, Chatan
- Early forms: Old Tamil: Middle Tamil

Language codes
- ISO 639-3: all
- Glottolog: alla1247
- ELP: Allar

Allar (IPA: [ɐlːɐr], also known as Chatan) is a Dravidian language spoken in Kerala (Malappuram district-Perinthalmanna tahsil, Manjeri tahsil, Mannarmala, Aminikadu, and Tazhecode; Palakkad district-Mannarkkad and Ottappalam tahsils), India. Due to a lack of scholarly study, Allar cannot be classified within Dravidian at this time and may be a dialect of some other Dravidian language.
