= Kaikadi language =

Dravidian language of India

Kaikadi
- Native to: India
- Region: Maharashtra, Madhya Pradesh
- Ethnicity: Kaikadis
- Native speakers: 25,870 (2011 census)
- Language family: Dravidian: Southern; Southern I; Tamil–Kannada; Tamil–Kota; Tamil–Toda; Tamil–Irula; Tamil–Kodava–Urali; Tamil–Malayalam; Tamiloid; Yerukula–Korava–Kaikadi; Kaikadi
- Early forms: Old Tamil: Middle Tamil

Language codes
- ISO 639-3: kep
- Glottolog: kaik1244

The Kaikadi language (IPA: [kɐi̯kɐɖi]) is a Dravidian language related to Tamil, spoken by about 23,000 people of the formerly nomad Kaikadi tribe primarily in Maharashtra.
