= Paniya language =

Malayalamoid language of Kerala, India

Paniya
- Pania, Paniyan, Panyah
- പണിയ
- Native to: India
- Region: Kerala
- Ethnicity: Paniyas
- Native speakers: 23,000 (2011 census); 23% of ethnic population
- Language family: Dravidian: Southern; Southern I; Tamil–Kannada; Tamil–Kota; Tamil–Toda; Tamil–Irula; Tamil–Kodava–Urali; Tamil–Malayalam; Malayalamoid; Paniya–Ravula; Paniya
- Early forms: Old Tamil: Middle Tamil

Language codes
- ISO 639-3: pcg
- Glottolog: pani1256

Paniya (IPA: [pɐɳijɐ]) is one of the Malayalamoid languages spoken in India. It is spoken by the Paniya people, a scheduled tribe with a majority of its speakers in the state of Kerala. The language is also known as Pania, Paniyan and Panyah. It belongs to the Dravidian family of languages. According to the 1981 Census, there were 63,827 speakers of Paniya which includes 56,952 in Kerala, 6,393 in Tamil Nadu, 482 in Karnataka. Most of its speakers are found in the Wayanad, Kozhikode, Kannur and Malappuram districts of Kerala, and to the west of the Nilgiri Hills in Tamil Nadu.

== See also ==
- List of Indian languages by number of native speakers
