= Mullu Kurumba language =

Southern Dravidian language

Mullu Kurumba
- Native to: India
- Region: Kerala, Tamil Nadu
- Native speakers: 26,000 (2004)
- Language family: Dravidian: Southern; Southern I; Tamil–Kannada; Tamil–Kota; Tamil–Toda; Tamil–Irula; Tamil–Kodava–Urali; Tamil–Malayalam; Malayalamoid; Mullu Kurumba
- Early forms: Old Tamil: Middle Tamil

Language codes
- ISO 639-3: kpb
- Glottolog: mull1244

Mullu Kurumba (IPA: [muɭːu kurum(b)ɐ]) is a Southern Dravidian language closely related to Malayalam.

== Geographical distribution ==
According to Ethnologue, approximately 25,000 Mullu Kurumba speakers are situated in the Sulthan Bathery and Vythiri tahsils in the Wayanad district of Kerala; and the remaining more than 1,000 are situated in Erumad and Cherangodu villages of the Gudalur Tahsil, Nilgiri District, Tamil Nadu.
