= Mannan language =

Dravidian language of Southern India

Mannan
- Native to: India
- Region: Kerala, Tamil Nadu
- Ethnicity: Mannan
- Native speakers: (7,900 cited 2001 census)
- Language family: Dravidian: Southern; Southern I; Tamil–Kannada; Tamil–Kota; Tamil–Toda; Tamil–Irula; Tamil–Kodava–Urali; Tamil–Malayalam; Tamiloid; Muthuvan–Mannan; Mannan
- Early forms: Old Tamil: Middle Tamil

Language codes
- ISO 639-3: mjv
- Glottolog: mann1246

Mannan (IPA: [mɐnːɐn]) is a Dravidian language of Kerala and Tamil Nadu that is classified under the Tamil languages.
