= Eranadan language =

Dravidian language

Eranadan
- ഏറനാടൻ ഭാഷ ا٘يرَناڊَن
- Native to: India
- Region: Malappuram District
- Ethnicity: Aranadan
- Native speakers: (200 in more accessible areas cited 2001 census)
- Language family: Dravidian: Southern; Southern I; Tamil–Kannada; Tamil–Kota; Tamil–Toda; Tamil–Irula; Tamil–Kodava–Urali; Tamil–Malayalam; Malayalamoid; Eranadan
- Early forms: Old Tamil: Middle Tamil
- Writing system: Ponnani script, Malayalam script

Language codes
- ISO 639-3: aaf
- Glottolog: aran1261
- ELP: Aranadan

Eranadan (IPA: [eːrɐnaːɖɐn], ISO: ēṟanāṭan) is a Dravidian language spoken by several hundred people, predominantly in the region of Eranad, Malappuram district, Kerala, India. It is classified under the Malayalamoid languages.
