= Ravula language =

Malayalamoid language spoken in India

Ravula
- Yerava, Adiyan
- Native to: India
- Region: Kodagu District, Wayanad District
- Ethnicity: 41,000 Ravula (2011 census)
- Native speakers: 26,563 (2011 census)
- Language family: Dravidian: Southern; Southern I; Tamil–Kannada; Tamil–Kota; Tamil–Toda; Tamil–Irula; Tamil–Kodava–Urali; Tamil–Malayalam; Malayalamoid; Paniya–Ravula; Ravula
- Early forms: Old Tamil: Middle Tamil

Language codes
- ISO 639-3: yea
- Glottolog: ravu1237

Ravula (IPA: [raːʋuɭɐ], known locally as Yerava IPA: [jerɐʋɐ] in Karnataka and Adiyan IPA: [ɐɖijɐn] in Kerala), is a Dravidian language of Karnataka and Kerala spoken by the Adiyar. It is classified under the category Malayalamoid languages in both the linguistics and the Census of India. However their language exhibits a number of peculiarities which marks it off from Malayalam as well as from other tribal speeches in the districts of Kodagu and Wayanad. It is spoken by 25,000 Ravulas (locally called Yerava) in Kodagu district of Karnataka and by 1,900 Ravulas (locally called Adiyan) in the adjacent Wayanad district of Kerala. The term 'Yerava' is derived from the Kodava Language or Kannada word Yeravalu meaning borrow.

== Phonology ==
Adiya's phonology is similar to Malayalam with a few differences.

	Front	Central	Back
Close	i		u
Near-close	ɪ		ʊ
Close-mid	e		o
Mid		ə	
Open-mid	ɛ		ɔ
Open	a		

- All vowels except for /ɪ,ə,ʊ,ɔ/ demonstrate contrastive vowel length.

=== Consonants ===
		Bilabial	Dental	Alveolar	Retroflex	Palatal	Velar
Nasal		m	n̪	n	ɳ	ɲ	ŋ
Stop	voiceless	p	t̪		ʈ	c	k
Stop	voiced	b	d̪		ɖ	ɟ	g
Fricative				s			
Approximant		ʋ		l	ɭ	j	
Trill				r			
