= Kakkala language =

Southern Dravidian language of Kerala, India

Kakkala
- Native to: India
- Region: Kerala
- Ethnicity: Kakkala
- Language family: Dravidian: Southern; Southern I; Tamil–Kannada; Tamil–Kota; Tamil–Toda; Tamil–Irula; Tamil–Kodava–Urali; Tamil–Malayalam; (unclassified); Kakkala
- Early forms: Old Tamil: Middle Tamil

Language codes
- ISO 639-3: None (mis)
- Glottolog: kakk1234

Kakkala (IPA: [kaːkːaːlɐ]) is a Southern Dravidian language of Kerala, India. It is unclassified but is probably one of the Malayalamoid languages or one of the Tamiloid languages.
