= Paliyan language =

Language related to Malayalam

Paliyan
- പാലിയൻ
- Native to: India
- Region: Kerala
- Native speakers: (9,500 cited 2001 census)
- Language family: Dravidian: Southern; Southern I; Tamil–Kannada; Tamil–Kota; Tamil–Toda; Tamil–Irula; Tamil–Kodava–Urali; Tamil–Malayalam; Tamiloid; Tamil–Paliyan; Paliyan
- Early forms: Old Tamil: Middle Tamil

Language codes
- ISO 639-3: pcf
- Glottolog: pali1274

Paliyan (IPA: [pɐɭijɐn]) is a Dravidian language of Kerala that is closely related to Tamil. It is spoken by the Paliyans.
