= Proto–South Dravidian language =

Hypothetical ancestor of the South Dravidian languages

Proto–South Dravidian
- Proto–South Dravidian I
- Reconstruction of: South Dravidian languages
- Region: Primarily South India, possibly also areas of North India during Bronze Age.
- Era: c. 2nd–1st millennium BC
- Reconstructed ancestor: Proto-Dravidian

Proto–South Dravidian is the linguistic reconstruction of the common ancestor of the southern Dravidian languages native to southern India. Its descendants include Tamil, Kannada, Malayalam, Tulu, Badaga, Kodava, Irula, Kota and Toda. South Dravidian is sometimes referred to as South Dravidian I (SD1) by linguists.

== History ==
Going by attested changes in written documents, the Proto–South Dravidian I (PSD1) language has been hypothesised to have been present in the second half of the first millennium BC. Some linguists infer it to have split from Proto–South Dravidian II (Also known as South Central Dravidian or Telugu-Kui) at the beginning of the first millennium BC. These datings however, have been noted to be vague approximations. Til the 4th-5th century BC, Proto–South Dravidian remained one language, with possible dialectal variations.

== Phonology ==
=== Vowels ===
Proto–South Dravidian inherited the system of five short and long vowels from Proto-Dravidian: *a, *ā, *i, *ī, *u, *ū, *e, *ē, *o, *ō.

=== Consonants ===
Old Tamil, the earliest attested branch of South Dravidian has preserved an inventory of 17 consonants very similar to Proto-Dravidian: /p t ṯ c ṭ k, m n ñ ṇ, r ẓ, l ḷ, y w *H/.

=== Shared innovations ===
In Proto–South Dravidian I, there is a merger of Proto-Dravidian high vowels *i*u with *e*o in the environment [C-a]. There is also a loss of *c following two intermediate stages of s and h in initial and medial positions. This sporadic loss of *c is also shared with the neighboring Telugu language, which suggests that the change occurred when the SD1 subgroup neighbored the ancestor of Telugu right from the beginning. Proto-Dravidian *ṯ also becomes *ṟ in intervocalic position in PSD1.

PSD1 also innovated separate demonstrative pronouns for females with a feminine suffix *-aḷ: *avaḷ (distal) *ivaḷ (proximal), *uvaḷ (yonder).

== Society ==
The vocabulary of PSD indicates that the society was much more developed than at the Proto-Dravidian stage, although not all reconstructed words are from a single chronological stage. There are several new words for headman, rulers (including an Indo-Aryan loan word), taxes, armies, territorial divisions, tolls and customs, debt collection and corvée labor.

There are also terms for urban structures and various types of habitations including villages, towns, castles, forts, prisons (or storehouses), palaces and streets. The caste system is well established with several names of occupations which later became caste terms. There are also many terms for metal objects such as weapons, ships, vehicles with wheels, clothes, and valuable stones. There are new developments in agriculture with new crops and irrigation techniques. This more advanced lifestyle has yet to be identified in the archaeological record of peninsular India in the timeframe of Proto–South Dravidian.

== Vocabulary ==
=== Shared words with Akkadian ===
South Dravidian I (SD1) *eḷḷu (sesame) is cognate with Akkadian ellu which suggests that the name was in use at the time of trade between the Indus Valley Civilisation (IVC) and Mesopotamia (circa 2600-1900 BC). As *eḷḷu is only found in SD1, it suggests that specifically SD1 speakers were involved in the Indus-Mesopotamian trade, and that SD1 speakers migrated down the west coast of India following the collapse of the IVC (circa 1900-1300 BC). This hypothesis is further supported by several Dravidian loan words in Sanskrit like phala ‘fruit’ and mayūra ‘peacock’ being closer to the SD1 forms than to Proto-Dravidian forms. The Akkadian word for ivory (pīru) is also said to be of Dravidian origin (*pīlu) and cognate with Brahui *pīl. These words reinforce the hypothesis that Dravidian speakers were present in the Indus Valley Civilisation.

=== Old Indo-Aryan loans in Proto–South Dravidian ===
The following Old Indo-Aryan loan words into Proto–South Dravidian have been proposed by linguist Franklin Southworth. The word *accu (axle) was hypothesised to have been loaned into Proto-Dravidian from Rig Vedic akṣa.

Proto–South Dravidian reconstruction	Meaning	Old Indo-Aryan
*arank	stage, platform, veranda	ranga
*arac-an	king	rājan
*argaḷ	bar, cross bar	argala
*āṇi	nail	āṇi
*kañc	bell metal	kamśa
*kaṭṭ	stick	kāṣṭha
*kump-at	gourd, pumpkin	kumbha-phala, kumbhanda
*paṇ-i	comb	phaṇaga, (Marathi phaṇi)
*paṇṭi	cart, wagon	bhāṇḍa
*pōy	member of a spec. tribe/caste, headman	bhōgin
*may-aṇ	wax	madana, mayana, (Marathi men)

=== Other early borrowings in the Vedic period ===
The following words are attested in both Proto–South Dravidian and Rig Vedic Sanskrit (circa 1400 BC), with uncertainty of which direction the borrowing was from. The Rig Vedic ulukhala (mortar) is proposed to be cognate with PSD *ul-akk ‘pestle’, while Rig Vedic nīla (blue) is proposed to be cognate with PSD *aṇile (ink nut tree).

Other words in the Shatapatha Brahmana (circa 700 BC) include arka (the plant Calatropis gigantea) cognate with PSD *erukku and muñja (‘the grass Saccharum Sara) cognate with PSD *muñci.

== Substratum effect on Indo-Aryan ==
Ferenc Ruzca states that all the major shifts in Indo-Aryan phonetics over two millennia can be attributed to the constant influence of an old Dravidian language with a similar phonetic structure to Tamil.
