= History of Wayanad =

Wayanad district, which is home to Edakkal Caves, has human settlement from prehistoric era. Wayanad is the sole Plateau in Kerala. The tribal dialects of Wayanad like the Ravula language and the Paniya language are closely related to Malayalam.

== Pre-history ==
Wayanad district

Historians believe that the human settlements existed in these parts for at least ten centuries B.C. Much evidence of New Stone Age civilisation can be seen in the hills throughout the present day Wayanad district. The Edakkal Caves has 6000-year-old rock engravings from the Neolithic age. The recorded history of this district is available only from the 18th century.

== Ezhimala kingdom ==
In the earliest part of the recorded history of Wayanad District, Kasaragod-Kannur-Wayanad-Kozhikode Districts in the northern part of present-day Kerala were ruled by the Nannans (Mushika dynasty) who later came to be known as the Kolathiris. Politically the area was part of the Ezhimala Kingdom with its Capital at Ezhimala in present-day Kannur district. The most famous King of Ezhimala was Nannan whose Kingdom extended up to Gudalur, Nilgiris and northern parts of Coimbatore. It is said that Nannan took refuge at Wayanad hills in the 5th century CE when he was lost to Cheras, just before his execution in a battle, according to the Sangam works. Wayanad was a part of the Karkanad which included the eastern regions of Ezhimala kingdom (Wayanad-Gudalur areas including part of Kodagu (Coorg)). Karkanad along with Poozhinadu, which contained much of the coastal belt wedged between Mangalore and Kozhikode was under Ezhimala kingdom with the headquarters at Ezhimala.

Some linguists claim that an inscription found from Edakkal Caves, Wayanad, which belongs to the 3rd century CE (approximately 1,800 years old), is the oldest available inscription in Malayalam, as they contain two modern Malayalam words, Ee (This) and Pazhama (Old), those are not found even in the Oldest form of Tamil.

== Mushika Dynasty ==
The Mooshika dynasty were considered descendants of Nannan of Ezhimala. By the 14th century, Mooshaka Kingdom lost its prominence, Kolathirinad and the Rulers as Kolathiris emerged. The Mushika Kingdom at the peak of its power reportedly extended from Netravati River (Mangalore) in the north to Korapuzha (Kozhikode) in the south with Arabian Sea on the west and Kodagu hills on the eastern boundary, also including the isolated islands of Lakshadweep in Arabian Sea.

== Kingdom of Kottayam ==
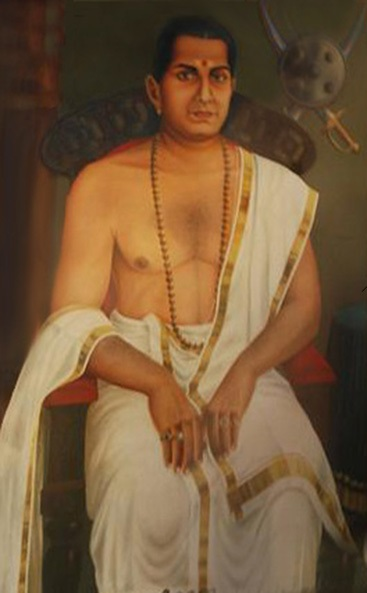
Veera Kerala Varma Pazhassi Raja, painting by Raja Ravi Varma

The Kolathiri Dominion emerged into independent 10 principalities, i.e., Kadathanadu (Vadakara), Randathara or Poyanad (Dharmadom), Kottayam (Thalassery), Nileshwaram, Iruvazhinadu (Panoor), Kurumbranad, etc., under separate royal chieftains due to the outcome of internal dissensions. The Nileshwaram dynasty on the northernmost part of Kolathiri dominion, were relatives to both Kolathunadu as well as Zamorin of Calicut, in the early medieval period. The origin of the Kottayam royal family (the Kottayam referred here is Kottayam-Malabar near Thalassery, not to be confused with Kottayam in Southern Kerala) is lost in obscurity. It has been stated that the Raja of Kottayam set up a semi-independent principality of his own at the expense of Kolathiris. In the 10th century AD, the region comprised erstwhile Taluks of Kottayam, Wayanad and Gudallur was called Puraikizhanad and its feudal lord Puraikizhars. The Thirunelly Inscriptions refer to the division of the Puraikizhar family into two branches viz., Elder (Muthukur) and Younger (Elamkur) in the beginning of the 11th century. In the 17th century, Kottayam-Malabar was the capital of the Puraikizhanad (Puranattukara) rajas. It was divided into three branches i.e., Eastern, Western and Southern under separate dignitaries known as Mootha, Elaya and Munnarkur Rajas. The Kottayam Rajas extended their influence up to the border of Kodagu. By the end of the 17th century, they shared the area of Thalassery Taluk with the Iruvazhinadu Nambiars and were in possession of North Wayanad and the small village of Thamarassery which formed the Eastern portion of the present Vadakara, Quilandy and Thamarassery Taluks.

== The Kutumbiyas (Kudumbiyas) ==
The two caves of Ampukuthimala (Edakal Caves) in Sulthan Bathery, with pictures on their walls and pictorial writings, speak volumes of a bygone civilisation. At the foot of the Edakal Male (hill) caves, Kannada inscriptions belonging to Canarese chieftain Vishnu Varma of Kutumbiya (Kudumbiya) clan of Mysore dating to c. 5th century CE were discovered which read – 'Palapulitaanamtakaari' or 'Pala pulinânam ta-kâri', Sri Vishnu Varma Kutumbiya Kulavardhanasya li..it..a..'. As per Hultzch, an epigraphist from the department of epigraphy, Madras, it speaks of the glorious descendant of Kutumbiya clan, Kannada chieftain, Vishnu Varma, as one who killed many tigers. Some scholars speculate this Kutumbiya to mean Kutumbin or householder.

== The (Western) Gangas ==
The recorded history of the Wayanad district exists only from the 10th century onward. In 930 AD, emperor Erayappa of Ganga Dynasty led his troops to south west of Mysore and after conquering, called it Bayalnad meaning the land of swamps. After Erayappa, his sons Rachamalla and Battunga fought each other for the new kingdom of their father's legacy. Rachamalla was killed and Battunga became the undisputed ruler of Bayalnad.

== The Kadambas ==
In the 12th century CE, Gangas were dethroned from Bayalnad by Kadamba dynasty of North Canara. Wayanad, called Bayalnad (Kannada) since beginning, was at that time divided into two portions – Bira Bayalnad and Chagi Bayalnad. One of the Mysore inscriptions (alluding perhaps to the treacherous beauty of the country, which attracted the stranger and then laid him low with malaria) says 'an adulteress with black waving curls, as adulteress with full-moon face, an adulteress with endless side-glances, an adulteress with adorned slim figure was this storeyed mansion, the double Bayalnad'. Kadamba Bayalnad emerged as a rule in the 11th century under their chief Raviyammarasa with Kirttipura (present Kittur town, Heggadadevanakote taluk, Mysuru, which got submerged in the backwaters of the Kabini river dam) in Punnad (Punnata) their capital. Kanthirava (1090 CE) was described as ruling Chagi-Bayalnad. Iravi-Challamma (1108 CE) was the ruler of Bira-Bayalnad.

== The Western Chalukyas (Kalyani Chalukyas) ==
Under emperor Tailapa II (973–997 CE) many Jain Basthis were built in south India. The Jain centres and agricultural villages of Wayanad came in to existence during this time. There are many proofs, which justify the existence of Jainism in Wayanad.

== The Hoysalas ==
In 1104 CE Vishnuvardhana of Hoysala invaded Bayalnad and Nilgiris and annexed them followed by Vijayanagara dynasty in the 14th century. A Kadamba king, Mukkanna-Kadamba ruled Bayal-nad in and around 1138 CE.

== The Vijayanagara empire ==
A feudatory chieftain of Sangama dynasty (1336-1485 CE) of Vijayanagara empire, Immadi Kadamba Raya Vodeyayya of Bayalnad Kadambas, is said to have ruled Bayalnad.

== The Mysore Wodeyars and the sultans ==
In 1610 CE Udaiyar Raja Wadiyar of Mysore drove out Vijayanagara General and became the ruler of Bayalnad and the Nilgiris. Bayalnad is the present Wayanad.

An inscription discovered from a Jain Basti at Varadur near Panamaram dated to Saka era 1606 which is 1684 CE, shows that Jainism was still very powerful even in the 17th century. The inscription which was noticed by noted epigraphist and historian Dr. M. R. Raghava Varriar, has reference about the earliest Jain settlements and temples in Wayanad. The copper plate inscription which was placed under a water fountain at Varadur Ananthanatha Swami temple deals with the grant of various ritual materials to the Jain Basathis of Wayanad by Lalithappa, the younger son of Bommarasa of the Karkala Aremane Basathi.

The Kannada inscription dated Sakavarsha 1606 (i.e., 1684 CE) Rakthakshi Samvatsara Jeshtabahula Shukravara reads:

'Karkala aremane basthiya bommarasanu mommaga lalithappanu devapooje chinna belli thamra kanchu upakaranagalu madisi kotta bibara'.

The Jain Chaithyalayas or temples referred in the inscription are Arepathra, Bennegodu, Palagondu, Hanneradubeedhi, Puthangadi (Muthangadi) and Hosangadi. The Arepathra Chaityalaya is not yet identified. It is believed that it was at the hilltop near to the Panamaram river. The other Kannada touch place names are identified with their present Malayalam version names as Venniyode, Palukunnu, Sultan Batheri, Puthangadi and Mananthavady respectively. Raghava Varriar says that there were seven Jain centres in Wayanad viz. Manikyapuri, Ksheerapuri, Kalpathi, Vennayode, Palagondu, Hosangadi and Hanneradubeedhi. It is believed that Manikyapuri was at the present day Manichira. The location of Ksheerapuri is not yet identified. Kalpathi may be Kalpetta, the present day Wayanad district headquarters, Anjukunnu was then Hanjugondu, etc.

When Wayanad was under Hyder Ali's rule, the ghat road from Vythiri to Thamarassery was constructed. Then the British rulers developed this route to Carter road. When Wayanad was under Tipu Sultan's rule British invasion started. Tussle and turbulent times followed. The British claimed Wayanad under the 1792 treaty of Srirangapatna citing it was part of Malabar. Tipu Sultan went in appeal before the Governor General. Considering his arguments, relying on the successive Karnataka rule for centuries in Wayanad and its geographical detachment from Malabar, in 1798, Governor General Lord Mornington declared by proclamation that Wayanad had not been ceded to the East India Company by the treaty of 1792. Consequently, the British troops withdrew from Wayanad conceding to Tipu's rule. In 1799, after the fall of Sultan, the British handed over Wayanad by the treaty of 1799 to the Raja of Mysore. But by a supplementary treaty dated 29 December 1803 the East India Company repossessed Wayanad and thereafter administrated by Col. Arthur Wellesley from Srirangapatna and North Wayanad came under the rule of the Pazhassi Raja dynasty of ancient Kottayam.

== Mysore Sultans ==
When Wayanad was under Hyder Ali's rule, the ghat road from Vythiri to Thamarassery invented. Then the British rulers developed this route to Carter road. After Hyder Ali, his son Tipu Sultan took control over the territory.

== Veerakerala Varma Pazhassi Raja ==
People of Wayanad live in absolute harmony with each other. Wayanad is famous for the unparalleled freedom fight against the British and martyrdom of Pazhasshi Raja with the help of the Kurichya sect of the tribal community in association with Hindus and Muslims of the Malabar region. Initially the British had to suffer local resistance against their rule under the leadership of Kerala Varma Pazhassi Raja, who had popular support in Thalassery-Wayanad region.

== British rule ==
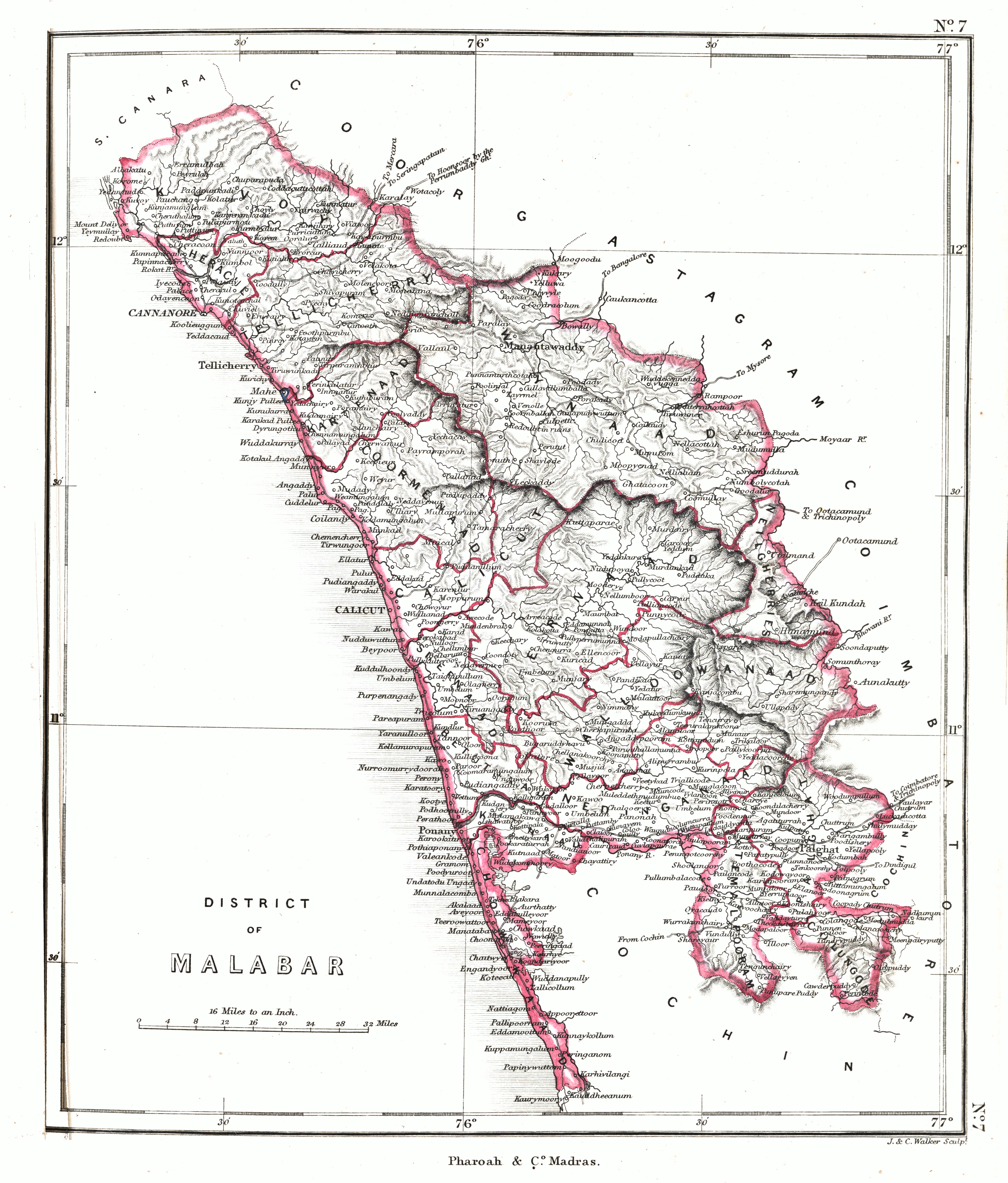
A map of the erstwhile Malabar District in 1854. Note that a major portion of present-day Nilgiris district was also part of Wayanad Taluk in Malabar District.

The British claimed Wayanad under 1792 treaty of Srirangapatna citing it was part of Malabar. Tipu Sultan went in appeal before the Governor General. Considering his arguments, relying on the successive Karnatic rule for centuries in Wayanad and its geographical detachment from Malabar, in 1798, Governor General Lord Mornington declared by proclamation that Wayanad had not been ceded to the East India Company by the treaty of 1792. Consequently, the British troops withdrew from Wayanad conceding to Tipu's rule. In 1799, after the fall of Sultan, the British handed over Wayanad by treaty of 1799 to the Raja of Mysore. But by a supplementary treaty dated 29 December 1803 the East India Company repossessed South Wayanad and thereafter administrated by Col. Arthur Wellesley from Srirangapatna and North Wayanad came under the rule of the Pazhassi Raja dynasty of ancient Kottayam.

Wayanad eventually became part of Kerala despite its geographical delimitations and political descent in 1956 on State's reorganisation. Even now there is a considerable Kannada speaking population and the reminiscence of centuries old Karnataka rule is omnipresent in Wayanad. Agriculture Cultivation started broadly after 1900 A.D onwards. The British authorities opened up the plateau to cultivation of tea and other cash crops by constructing roads across the dangerous slopes of Wayanad, to Kozhikode and Thalassery. Later, they extended these new roads to the cities of Mysore and Ooty through Gudalur. Settlers emigrated from all parts of Kerala and the fecund lands proved a veritable goldmine with incredible yields of cash crops. When the State of Kerala came into being in November 1956, Wayanad was part of Kannur district. Later, south Wayanad was added to Kozhikode district. To fulfil the aspirations of the people of Wayanad for development, North Wayanad and South Wayanad were carved out and joined to form the present district of Wayanad. This district came into being on 1 November 1980 as one of the twelve districts of Kerala, consisting of three taluks; Vythiri, Mananthavady, and Sulthan Bathery.

== Formation of Wayanad District ==
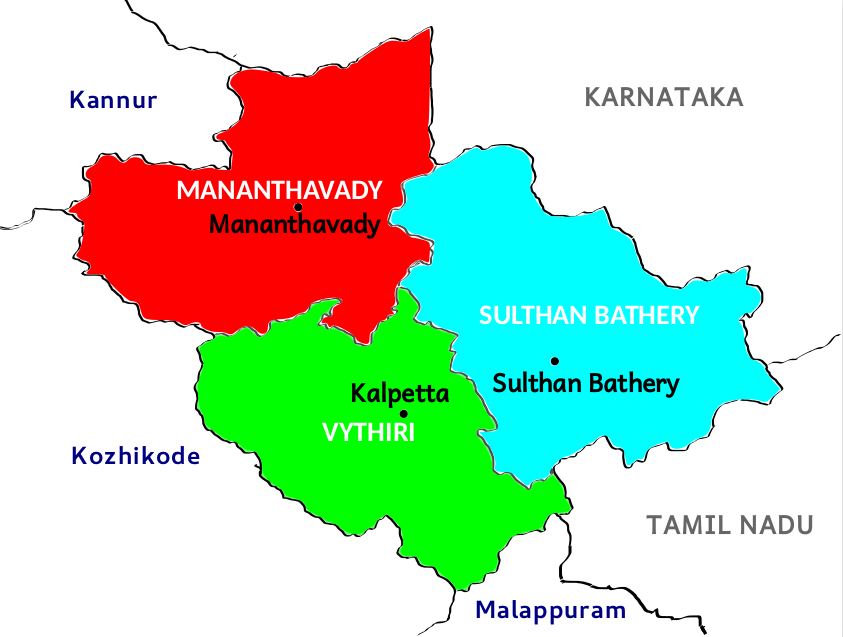
Taluks in Wayanad district

During British Raj, Wayanad was a Taluk in the erstwhile Malabar District. The regions included in the Taluks of Gudalur and Pandalur in present-day Nilgiris district, which is also known as Southeast Wayanad, also formed part of the erstwhile Wayanad Taluk. Southeast Wayanad was a part of Malabar District until 31 March 1877, when it was transferred to the neighbouring Nilgiris district due to the heavy population of Malabar and the small area of Nilgiris. Wayanad was a separate Revenue Division with the Malabar District until 1924.

During the States Reorganisation of 1956 after the independence of India, the Mysore state (present-day Karnataka) claimed for Wayanad due to its historical and geographical peculiarities. However, on the linguistic survey of 1951 census of India, it was found that 87.5% of the total population of Wayanad were native speakers of Malayalam at that time, while Kannada was confined to just 6.2% of the total population.

On 1 January 1957, the erstwhile Malabar District was divided into three: Kannur, Kozhikode, and Palakkad. On the same day Wayanad Taluk was split up into North Wayanad and South Wayanad. Initially both of the Taluks of Wayanad were included in newly formed Kannur district. However, after two months on 15 March 1957, South Wayanad Taluk was transferred into Kozhikode district. The North Wayanad Taluk was transferred to Kozhikode district on 1 January 1979.

Wayanad district was formed by incorporating the Taluks of North Wayanad and South Wayanad on 1 November 1980 as the 12th district of Kerala. On the same date, North Wayanad Taluk was renamed as Mananthavady, and South Wayanad was bifurcated to form the Taluks of Sultan Bathery and Vythiri. Kalpetta in Vythiri Taluk became the headquarters of new district.
