= Kaikadi =

Kaikadi may refer to:

- Kaikadi people, a formerly nomadic Indian tribe
- Kaikadi language, their Dravidian language
- Kaikadi (dog), a breed of Indian sighthound
