= Yerukala =

Yerukala or Yerukula may refer to:

- Yerukala people, a local name for the Koravar people of Tamil Nadu, India
- Yerukala language, their Dravidian language
