= Kej =

Kej can refer to:

- Alexei Leonov Kemerovo International Airport, an airport in Keremovo Oblast, Russia
- Kadar language, Dravidian language of India
- Ricky Kej (born 1981), U.S.-born Indian musician
