= Theyyannam =

Type of dance

Theyyannam is a traditional ritual folk art form that exists among the Pulaya, Kurava and Paraya communities of the central Travancore region in Kerala, India. It is mainly performed in Mavelikkara, Pandalam and some other parts of Alappuzha district. It is an art form associated with agriculture, specifically paddy cultivation.

== Ritual dance ==
Eight men plough up a paddy field and plant seedlings. Women enter with breakfast for the men and begin to help planting. They then grow, harvest and thresh the crop together, thus representing all stages of cultivation. The dance is performed to the accompaniment of harmonium, idakka and tabla.
