= Bellari (disambiguation) =

Bellari (also Bellary or Ballari) may refer to–

- Bellary, a historic city in Bellary District in Karnataka state
  - Bellary district, a district in Karnataka state
  - Bellary (Vidhan Sabha constituency)
  - Bellary (Lok Sabha constituency)
  - Bellari language, a language of India
