= MJV =

MJV may refer to:

- Murcia–San Javier Airport, Spain, IATA code MJV
- Mannan language, India, ISO 639-3 code mjv
