= Eranadan people =

Regions with significant populations
- Kerala

Languages
- Eranadan

Related ethnic groups
- Other Malayalamoid-speaking peoples

The Eranadan, also known as Arnadan are Adivasi, a designated Scheduled Tribe in the Indian state of Kerala. They are an aboriginal tribe whose traditional way of life has been based on hunting and gathering.
