= Paduvar Muththappa Chettiar =

Paduvar Muththappa Chettiyar ( பாடுவார் முத்தப்பச் செட்டியார்) (1767–1829) was an Indian poetic scholar of the Minor Literary Canons in Tamil.

== Works ==
- Nagara vaazththu (நகர வாழ்த்து) a poetical work containing Historical information of Old Tamil and ethnographic descriptions of Nagaraththaar Community.
- Jeyangkondaar Cathagam (செயங்கொண்டார் சதகம்) a poetic work containing 100 songs on Jeyangkondiiswarar enshrined in the Siva Temple of Nemam. In this work he has included a proverb in each and every song. It is printed and published in 1893.
- Thirumuruga Vilaacam (திருமுக விலாசம்)
- Kuthiriyadi (குதிரையடி) a Minor Canon
- Kuluva Naadagam (குளுவ நாடகம்) a drama
- Pazhaniyaandavar Pathigam (பழனியாண்டவர் பதிகம்)
- Kudrakkudi Murugan Pathigam (குன்றக்குடி முருகன் பதிகம்)
