= Bellari language =

Dravidian language of India

Bellari
- Belari
- ಬೆಳ್ಳಾರಿ ബെല്ലാരി
- Native to: India
- Region: Karnataka & Kerala
- Extinct: 2023 (with the death of Sidda Belare)
- Language family: Dravidian: South Dravidian; South Dravidian I; Southwestern Dravidian; Bellari
- Writing system: Kannada script, Malayalam script

Language codes
- ISO 639-3: brw
- Glottolog: bell1261
- ELP: Bellari
- Bellari is classified as Critically Endangered according to the UNESCO Atlas of the World's Languages in Danger

Bellari (IPA: [beɭːaːri]) was a Dravidian language of India spoken by the Bellara, a Scheduled Caste of Karnataka and Kerala, it went extinct with the death of Sidda Belare. It was reportedly close to Tulu and Koraga (especially the former), but it is not known if it is a separate language or a dialect of Tulu. A community of fifty families of basket-weavers lives in Kundapura Taluk in coastal Karnataka.
