= Kaikadi people =

Ethnic group of Indian state Maharashtra

The Kaikadi are a community in the Indian states of Maharashtra and Karnataka. Their name is derived from kai (meaning "hand") and kade (meaning "basket"), while the community derives its name from kai (a stand-in for a name) and kadi (a type of twig). Traditionally, they were nomadic, mainly wandering in the Vidarbha region of the state, but most have now settled down. They speak Kaikadi, a Dravidian language closely related to Tamil with significant Indo-Aryan admixture. They practice the puberty function like other Tamil communities.

== History ==
Colonial scholars had a significant disdain for the community, with Robert Vane Russell calling them "disreputable" and with "bad morals." Russell claimed their name derived from kai (meaning "hand") and kade (meaning "basket"), while the community derives its name from kai (a stand-in for a name) and kadi (a type of twig). Russell recorded their occupation as basket-making. Colonial scholars claimed the community arrived from Telangana, and they were related to the Yerukala.

They touch supposedly "polluted" communities above the Kunbi in the caste hierarchy, and they are barred from entering village temples, although they can live inside.

They are classified as a Denotified Tribe for purposes of Reservation. However, in much of Vidharbha, they are classified as Scheduled Castes, and they are central cast come under the OBC (other backward class) class. The Kaikadis mainly worship Nagas, mainly on Nag Panchami, but also pay reverence to Khandoba.

== Clans ==
The community has several endogamous septs: 9 recorded in Vidarbha. They also have a set of exogamous clans: Gadge, Gaikwad, Patke, Mule, Makadwale, Shamdire and Mane. Marriage within the clan is forbidden, as is marriage outside a sept. Kaikadi men can't marry maternal aunt's daughter, although maternal uncle's children are allowed like in most of South India.
