= Kudiya language =

Dravidian language of India

Kudiya
- Native to: India
- Native speakers: 2,800 (2007)
- Language family: Dravidian: South Dravidian; South Dravidian I; Southwestern Dravidian; Kudiya–Tulu; Kudiya
- Writing system: Kannada script, Malayalam script

Language codes
- ISO 639-3: kfg
- Glottolog: kudi1237

Kudiya (IPA: [kuɖijɐ]) is a minor Dravidian language spoken by a scheduled tribe mostly in Dakshina Kannada, Udupi, Kodagu districts of Karnataka and Kasaragod, Kannur districts of Kerala in India.
