= Irula language =

Dravidian language spoken in India

Irula
- இருளா
- Native to: India
- Region: Nilgiri Mountains
- Ethnicity: Irula
- Native speakers: 11,870 (2011 census); Census conflates some speakers with Tamil
- Language family: Dravidian: Southern; Southern I; Tamil–Kannada; Tamil–Kota; Tamil–Toda; Tamil–Irula; Irula–Muduga; Irula
- Dialects: Kasaba (north Irula), South Irula (Mele Nadu, Vette Kada), Urali Irula
- Writing system: Tamil script

Language codes
- ISO 639-3: iru
- Glottolog: irul1243
- ELP: Irula
- Irula is classified as Vulnerable according to the UNESCO Atlas of the World's Languages in Danger

Irula (Natively: ër̠la/ïr̠la, IPA: [ərla, ɨrla]) is a Dravidian language spoken by the Irulas who inhabit the area of the Nilgiri mountains, in the states of Tamil Nadu, Kerala, and Karnataka, India. It is closely related to Tamil. It is written in the Tamil script.

== Etymology ==
Irula is derived from the term iruḷ "black" and -a/iga "people".

== Origins ==
The language was first described and classified by indologist Kamil Zvelebil, who in 1955 showed that the Irula language is an independent Southern Dravidian language that is akin to Tamil, particularly Old Tamil, with some Kannada-like features. Before that, it was traditionally denied or put to doubt, and Irula was described as a crude or corrupt mixture of Tamil and Kannada.

According to a tentative hypothesis by Kamil Zvelebil, a pre-Dravidian population that forms the bulk of the Irulas anthropologically began to speak an ancient pre- or proto-Tamil dialect, which was superimposed almost totally on their native pre-Dravidian speech. That then became the basis of the language, which must have subsequently been in close contact with the other tribal languages of the Nilgiri area as well as with the large surrounding languages such as Kannada, Tamil, and Malayalam.

== Phonology ==
The tables present the vowel and the consonant phonemes of Irula.

=== Vowels ===
	Front		Central				Back	
	short	long	short	long	short	long	short	long
High	i	iː	ɨ	ɨː	ʉ	ʉː	u	uː
Mid	e	eː	ə	əː	ɵ	ɵː	o	oː
Low			a	aː				

Zvelebil and Perialwar had listed centralized <ä, ǟ> before in the phonology. The real quality distinguishing <ä, ǟ> and <a, ā> is not clear.

=== Consonants ===
		Labial	Dental	Alveolar	Retroflex	Post-alv./ Palatal	Velar
Nasal		m		n	ɳ		
Stop	voiceless	p	t̪	t	ʈ	t͡ʃ	k
Stop	voiced	b	d̪	d	ɖ	d͡ʒ	ɡ
Fricative				s			
Approx.	median	ʋ				j	
Approx.	lateral			l	ɭ		
Rhotic				ɾ, r	ɽ		

- It is not clear how /d/ and /r/ are different phonemes.

== Sources ==
- Zvelebil, K. V. (1979), "Irula Riddles", Bulletin of the School of Oriental and African Studies, University of London, 42 (2): 361–368, doi:10.1017/S0041977X00145926, JSTOR 615027
- Krishnamurti, Bhadriraju (2003), The Dravidian Languages, Cambridge University Press, ISBN 0-521-77111-0
- Perialwar, R. (1978), A Grammar of Irula, Annamalai University
- Perialwar, R. (1979), Phonology of Irula with Vocabulary, Annamalai University
- Zvelebil, Kamil V. (2001), "Irula Phonological System", Nilgiri Areal Studies, Charles University in Prague, Karolinum Press, ISBN 80-7184-945-6
