= Kurava =

Regions with significant populations
- Tamil Nadu, Kerala

Languages
- Tamil, Malayalam, Kakkala

Religion
- Hinduism

Related ethnic groups
- Tamil people

The Kuravas, also called Kakkalas, are an ethnic Tamil community native to the Kurinji mountain region of Tamil Nadu and Kerala, India. The name "Kuravan" derives from a Tamil word meaning "leader" or "uyarnthavan" (thalaivan). The community is known by various regional names across South India, including Yerukula in Andhra Pradesh, Korama and Korachas in Karnataka, Kaikadi in Maharashtra, Burgandi in Madhya Pradesh and Sidanar in Kerala.

They are recognized as Scheduled Castes in Kerala and Tamil Nadu.

== History ==
The Kuravas are an ancient community mentioned in Sangam literature, alongside the Kallar and Maravar. They historically inhabited the Kurinji (mountainous) lands as hunters, gatherers, traders, and craftsmen. The community is associated with the Tamil god Murugan, who is regarded in Hindu mythology as a Kuravan, the god of the Kurinji mountains.

The word "Kuravan" means "uyarnthavan" or "Thalaivan" means "Leader" and from Tamil Sangam period (dated c. 300 BCE – c. 300 CE, during Sangam period) this community mentioned in many Tamil epics. Examples: Tolkāppiyam, Silapathigaram, Purananuru, Kutrala Kuravanji and more. They were ruling the Mountain (Kurunji) lands, Kannapa Nayanar (கண்ணப்ப நாயனார் குறவர்) one of the Nayanars (or Nayanmars; Tamil:நாயன்மார், romanized: Nāyaṉmār, lit. 'hounds of Siva', and later 'teachers of Siva') were a group of 63 saints living in Tamil Nadu during the 6th to 8th centuries CE who were devoted to the Hindu god Shiva.), and there are so many poet and warriors who lived in this community.

According to Hindu mythology, Murugan, Tamil god, is a Kuravan, he is the God of the (Kurinji) mountains, and his wife Valli also a Kurathi.

Kuravar is an ancient clan mentioned in the Sangam literature, along with Kallar and Maravar. Kuravar were amongst the inhabitants of Kurinji land as "the hunters and the gatherers, the people of foothills" along with Poruppan (the soldiers), Verpan (the leaders of the tribe / weaponists), Silamban (masters of martial arts / the art of fighting), and Kaanavar (the people of the mountainous forests).

During British rule in India, the Kuravas were classified under the Criminal Tribes Act of 1871 and subsequently denotified in 1952 following Indian independence. Today, an estimated 1.2 million Kuravas live across Tamil Nadu and Kerala, primarily in districts such as Salem, Coimbatore, Dharmapuri, Madurai, and Kanyakumari. The community has historically faced challenges regarding its tribal status and reservation rights, which have led to ongoing political advocacy. They had various privileges of riding public transportation without tickets, upon being in their traditional dress and were described as meat eaters for their consumption of dead animals. In many places, due to their hunter instincts and deep reverence of the profession, the men were allowed to carry rifles.

The 1906 publication the Travancore State Manual, of the princely state of Travancore, contains an entry describing the Kuravar:

The Kuravars, a race bearing resemblance to the Vedars or hill-men, form a pretty large community in Travancore, numbering 53,584 according to the last Census. The names of some places and tradition show that they must have been holding sway over some small territories on this coast. They are divided into several groups some of which are the Kunta Kurava, the Pandi Kurava, and the Kakka Kurava. Like the Pulayas they form the chief field labourers in the taluqs in which they live. They are found in the greatest number in Kunnattur, Chirayinkil, and Kottarakara. The Kunta Kurava, the most important sect among the class, resemble the Nayars in several respects. They are divided into Illam, Swarupam, &c, and follow the Marumakkathayam system of inheritance. They also celebrate the Kettu Kalyanam and Sambandham and observe sixteen days' death-pollution like the Nayars. Today there are an estimated 1.2 million(12 lakh) Kuravar in Tamil Nadu and Kerala.

== Etymology ==
The "Kuravan" is a Tamil word which "guru avar" means "Leader".

== Ethnonym ==
The "Kuravan" is a Tamil word which means "uyarnthavan" or "Thalaivan" means "Leader"

People of this community are called with different names in different parts of South India. They are called as Yerukula in Andhra Pradesh (derived from the tradition of fortune telling by the women), Korama, Korachas in Karnataka, Kaikadi in Maharashtra, and Sidanar in Kerala.The Gothras among all these communities is the same, i.e. Kavadiyar, Sathupadi, Maanipadi and Meluthar. They are also known as Malai Kuruvans, Kuravan, Thalaiyaris, Kavalkara Koravars, Uppu Koravars, Dabi Kuravar (Simbu Kuravar), Gandarvakottai Kuravar, Inji Kuravar, Koravas, Kalinji Dabikoravas, Kala Kuravar.

== Politics ==
The Kuravar community is tribal, but subsequent governments denied that fact and put the community out of the benefits given to Scheduled Tribes as per Indiaan government affirmative actions. This has led to protests and resentment from the community.

Kuravar community people are living in Kerala and all parts of the Tamil Nadu mostly the districts of Salem, Coimbatore, Dharmapuri, Madurai, Thiruvanamalai, vellore, Thanjavur, and Kanyakumari.

== Notes ==
1. Meena Radhakrishna (2006-07-16). "Dishonoured by history". folio: Special issue with the Sunday Magazine. The Hindu. Retrieved 2007-05-31.
2. ^ Travancore (Princely State); Aiya, V.N. (1906). The Travancore State Manual. 2. Travancore government Press. p. 402. Retrieved 2015-07-05.
