= Mavilan =

Scheduled Tribe of Kerala, India

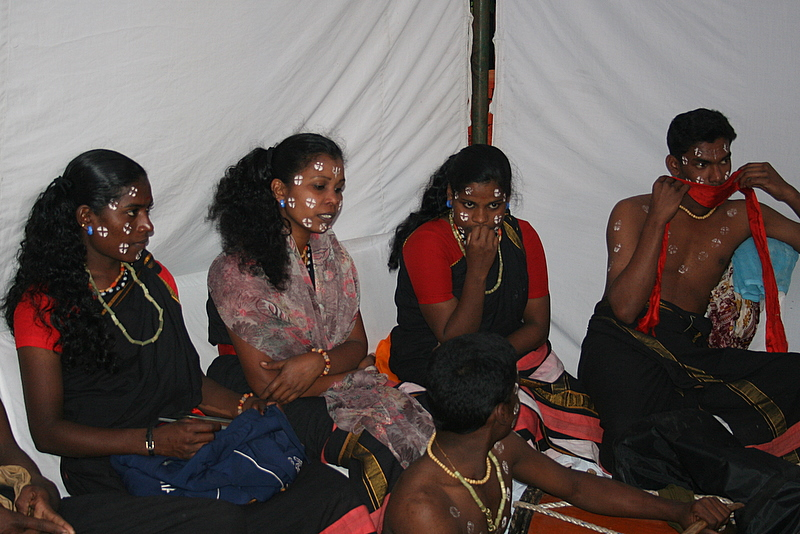
Mavilan women

The Mavilan (also spelled Mavilar or Mavillon) are an indigenous community classified as a Scheduled Tribe in the Indian state of Kerala. They are concentrated in the northern districts of Kasaragod and Kannur. Historically, the community has been associated with shifting cultivation, collection of forest produce, herbal medicine, bamboo work and basket-making. Agriculture and agricultural labour have also been important sources of livelihood.

According to the 2011 Census of India, the Mavilan population in Kerala was 30,867, comprising 14,972 males and 15,895 females. They were the fourth-largest Scheduled Tribe in the state by population. Approximately 55.56 per cent of the population lived in Kasaragod district.

The community was included in the Scheduled Castes list until 2002, according to a Kerala government socio-economic survey. It was subsequently included in the list of Scheduled Tribes through the Scheduled Castes and Scheduled Tribes Orders (Amendment) Act, 2002 (Act No. 10 of 2003).

== Etymology ==
Several explanations have been recorded for the name Mavilan. One interpretation connects it with mavila, a medicinal plant reportedly used by the community. Other explanations associate the name with mango leaves, which were allegedly used as clothing, or derive it from the expression Malayilae Velan (forest Velan). These explanations are recorded in the Kerala government's socio-economic survey, which does not establish a definitive origin for the name.

Edgar Thurston's Castes and Tribes of Southern India also discusses the proposed medicinal-herb derivation and records an alternative suggestion that the name has a Tulu or Kannada origin. The etymology therefore remains uncertain.

== History and traditional livelihoods ==
Historical accounts describe the Mavilans as a community whose livelihood was closely connected with forests and cultivation. K. P. Suresh's study describes the community as historically associated with hunting, gathering and shifting cultivation. It also discusses their agricultural knowledge and the changes that have affected traditional cultivation practices.

The Kerala government's socio-economic survey documents a traditional agricultural practice known as punam kothu, involving the clearing of forest vegetation and preparation of land for paddy cultivation. The survey also records shifting cultivation, collection of medicinal herbs and non-timber forest products, bamboo work and basket-making. By the time of the survey, most Mavilans depended on agricultural labour, while others worked in non-agricultural occupations or cultivated small holdings.

Suresh's field study, based on research in Panathady panchayat in Kasaragod district, documents traditional Mavilan agricultural knowledge. It describes the cultivation of different varieties of paddy and other crops, methods of seed storage, plant-based crop protection, and collective agricultural work. The study also records how changes in forest regulations, land use and access to land affected traditional cultivation practices.

== Social organisation ==
The Kerala government's socio-economic survey records changes in the community's traditional leadership. It states that the earlier headman was known as the Kiran, appointed by the landlord to supervise labour and settle disputes. The survey describes the Taravad karnavar as the later community headman, responsible for religious rites and rituals as well as community affairs.

Suresh's field study uses the term Kiragan for the headman involved in traditional agricultural activities. The Kiragan helped organise the selection and preparation of cultivation plots and performed customary observances associated with the agricultural cycle. These accounts describe leadership roles in particular historical and local contexts; they do not establish that the same system operates uniformly throughout the community today.

== Religion and cultural practices ==
The Mavilans participate in regional Hindu religious traditions and have distinctive community ritual and performing arts. Members of the community are also among the traditional performers associated with Theyyam, the ritual art form of northern Kerala. A 2008 report by Oneindia, based on an ANI dispatch, identifies Mavilans among the traditional communities whose male members perform Theyyam.

The community is particularly associated with Mangalamkali, a performance involving dance and songs. The Kerala Tourism Department describes it as a dance ritual followed by Mavilans in northern Kerala, traditionally performed by men and women at auspicious occasions such as marriages, accompanied by a percussion instrument called the thudi and folk songs.

KIRTADS also identifies Mangalamkali as one of the popular art forms performed by the community on marriage occasions. A chapter in the KIRTADS-published volume Tribal Art and Society: Challenges and Perspectives discusses the performance and its relationship with Mavilan social and cultural life.

The performance has also been covered in reporting on tribal art in Kerala. A 2010 article in The Hindu discussed the presentation and adaptation of tribal art forms in the state.

== Language ==
The Mavilans of Kasaragod speak a distinct variety of Tulu referred to in linguistic research as Mavilan Tulu or Markodi. The community also uses Malayalam, particularly in communication outside the home community. In Kannur, Malayalam is the dominant mother tongue of Mavilans and Mavilan Tulu has fallen out of use, according to KIRTADS.

The Mavilan variety has been the subject of linguistic documentation and comparison with other varieties of Tulu. Research has examined its phonology, grammar and vocabulary, as well as language use and the effects of contact with Malayalam. A doctoral research project at the Central University of Kerala has also focused on documenting the variety spoken by the Mavilan community in comparison with Tulu.

The SIL sociolinguistic survey examines language use and the vitality of Mavilan Tulu, including the influence of Malayalam and issues relating to language maintenance and transmission.

Glottolog lists Mavilan as a separate South Dravidian language and provides a separate classification entry for it.

== Contemporary situation ==
The Mavilans are recognised as a Scheduled Tribe in Kerala and are eligible for constitutional safeguards and government programmes for Scheduled Tribes. The Kerala government's socio-economic survey describes changes in traditional livelihoods, including a shift towards agricultural and other wage labour. Contemporary community life also includes settled cultivation and participation in wider economic and educational opportunities.

Language documentation and the preservation of traditional cultural practices, including Mangalamkali and agricultural knowledge, remain important aspects of work concerning Mavilan cultural heritage.
