= Koraga language =

Dravidian language spoken in India

Koraga
- ಕೊರಗ
- Native to: India
- Ethnicity: Koraga
- Native speakers: 45-50 (2018)
- Language family: Dravidian: South Dravidian; South Dravidian I; Southwestern Dravidian; Koraga
- Writing system: Kannada script, Malayalam script

Language codes
- ISO 639-3: Either: kfd – Korra Koraga vmd – Mudu Koraga
- Glottolog: kora1289

Koraga (IPA: [korɐɡɐ], also rendered Koragar, Koragara, Korangi) is a Dravidian language spoken by the Koraga people, a Scheduled tribe people of Dakshina Kannada, Karnataka, and Kerala in South West India. The dialect spoken by the Koraga tribe in Kerala, Mudu Koraga, is divergent enough to not be intelligible with Korra Koraga. Glottolog consider them as different languages.

== Classification ==
Koraga is a member of the Dravidian family of languages. It is further classified into the Southern Dravidian family. Koraga is a spoken language and generally not written, whenever it is written it makes use of Kannada script. Koraga people are generally conversant in Tulu and Kannada languages and hence use those languages as a medium for producing literature.

== Dialects ==
According to Bhat, there are 4 dialects:

- Onti (spoken in Udupi)
- Tappu (in Hebri)
- Mudu (in Kundapura)
- Ande (midway between tappu and onti and in Mangalore)

All the speakers who speak Mudu dialect are bilingual with Kannada language and all speaking onti dialect are bilingual with Tulu language. This has resulted a strong influence of Kannada on Mudu koraga and also similar influence of Tulu is seen on onti koraga dialect. Majority of negative forms of onti koraga language are borrowed from Tulu language.

== Phonology ==
=== Vowels ===
Vowels
| | Front | | Central | | Back | |
| | short | long | short | long | short | long |
|---|---|---|---|---|---|---|
| High | i | iː | ɨ | | u | uː |
| Mid | e | eː | | | o | oː |
| Low | | | a | aː | | |

=== Consonants ===
Consonants
| | | Bilabial | Dental/ Alveolar | Retroflex | Palatal | Velar | Glottal |
|---|---|---|---|---|---|---|---|
| Nasal | | m | n | | | ŋ | |
| Stop | voiceless | p | t | ʈ | c | k | |
| Stop | voiced | b | d | ɖ | ɟ | g | |
| Fricative | | | s | | | | |
| Approximant | | ʋ | l | | j | | |
| Rhotic | | | r | | | | |

== Bibliography ==
- Bhat, D. N. Shankara (1971). The Koraga Language. Pune: Deccan College Postgraduate and Research Institute.
- Krishnamurti, Bhadriraju (2003). The Dravidian Languages. Cambridge University Press. ISBN 978-0-521-77111-5.
