= Yerukala people =

Yerukala
Regions with significant populations
- Andhra Pradesh, India

Languages
- Yerukala, Telugu

Religion
- Hinduism

Related ethnic groups
- Telugus, Tamils

Yerukala or Erukala or Erukula is a Dravidian tribal community primarily found in Andhra Pradesh and Telangana in India. The population of Yerukala tribes according to 2011 census is 519,337. The total literacy rate among Yerukula is 48.12%. Most live in southern Coastal Andhra and Rayalaseema, with a smaller minority in districts of Telangana. Their native language is Yerukala, but most have shifted to Telugu. They were vilified in British sources for being habitual criminals, and so were placed under Criminal Tribes Act, although they were underrepresented in the population of criminals and were most likely targeted for their nomadic lifestyle. Subgroups of Yerukala include Dachi, Gadi, Gara, Ita, Karavala, Karivapaku, Prasi, Thudu, and Viti.
