= Malayalamoid languages =

Malayalam language group

Malayalamoid
- Geographic distribution: South India
- Linguistic classification: Dravidian: Southern; Southern I; Tamil–Kannada; Tamil–Kota; Tamil–Toda; Tamil–Irula; Tamil–Kodava–Urali; Tamil–Malayalam; Malayalamoid
- Early forms: Old Tamil: Middle Tamil

Language codes
- Glottolog: mala1541

The Malayalamoid languages, also known as the Malayalam languages, are the group of Dravidian languages and dialects most closely related to Malayalam.

Unclassified Kumbaran and Kakkala may be Malayalam languages as well.

== Internal classification ==
Glottolog classifies the Malayalam languages as follows:

- Malayalamoid
  - Allar
  - Eranadan
  - Kadar
  - Kalanadic
    - Kalanadi
    - Kunduvadi
    - Pathiya
  - Kanikkaran
  - Kurichiya
  - Malankuravan
  - Malaryan †
  - Malavedan
  - Malayalam
  - Mullu Kurumba
  - Ravulic
    - Paniya
    - Ravula
  - Thachanadan
  - Ullatan †
  - Vishavan
  - Wayanad Chetti
