= Tamiloid languages =

Dravidian language group

Tamiloid
- Geographic distribution: South India
- Linguistic classification: Dravidian: South Dravidian; South Dravidian I; Tamil–Kannada; Tamil–Kota; Tamil–Toda; Tamil–Irula; Tamil–Kodagu; Tamil–Malayalam; Tamiloid
- Early forms: Old Tamil: Middle Tamil

Language codes
- Glottolog: tami1299

The Tamiloid languages, also known as the Tamil languages, are the group of Dravidian languages most closely related to Tamil. In addition to Tamil itself, they are Eravallan, Kaikadi, Mala Malasar, Malasar, Malapandaram, Mannan, Muthuvan, Paliyan, Pattapu, Bugandi and Yerukala.

Arwi is not a separate language but a register of Tamil used by Muslims. It is written in the Arabic alphabet and contains many loans from Arabic.

Kakkala may be either a Tamil language or one of the Malayalam languages.

== Internal classification ==
Glottolog classifies the Tamiloid languages as follows:

- Tamiloid
  - Mala Malasar
  - Malapandaram
  - Malasa–Eravallan
    - Eravallan
    - Malasar
  - Muthuvan–Mannan
    - Mannan
    - Muthuvan
  - Old Tāmil
  - Tamil–Paliyan
    - Paliyan
    - Tamil
  - Yerukula–Korava–Kaikadi
    - Kaikadi
    - Pattapu
    - Yerukula
