= Urali language =

Dialect of Irula, a Dravidian language spoken in India

Urali
- Native to: Kerala, India
- Region: Idukki
- Ethnicity: 12,986 (2011 census)
- Language family: Dravidian: Southern; Southern I; Tamil–Kannada; Tamil–Kota; Tamil–Toda; Tamil–Irula; Iruloid; Urali

Language codes
- ISO 639-3: url
- Glottolog: ural1274

Urali (IPA: [uːraːɭi]) is a dialect of Irula, a southern Dravidian language. It is spoken by the Urali tribe in the hills around Idukki in Kerala, and Bargur in Tamil Nadu. It is still commonly spoken among the community.

== See also ==
- Irula language
- Irula people
- Dravidian languages
- Dravidian peoples
- Languages of India
- Languages of Kerala
- Languages of Tamil Nadu
