= Middle Tamil =

Form of the Tamil language used from the 8th to the 15th century

- Era: 8th - 15th CE
- Language family: Dravidian: Southern; Tamil–Kannada; Tamil–Kodagu; Tamil languages; Middle Tamil
- Early form: Old Tamil
- Writing system: Vaṭṭeḻuttu (c. 8th CE); Pallava (c. 8th CE); Grantha (c. 8th - 15th CE); Tamil script (c. 8th - 15th CE)

Language codes
- ISO 639-3: –
- Glottolog: None

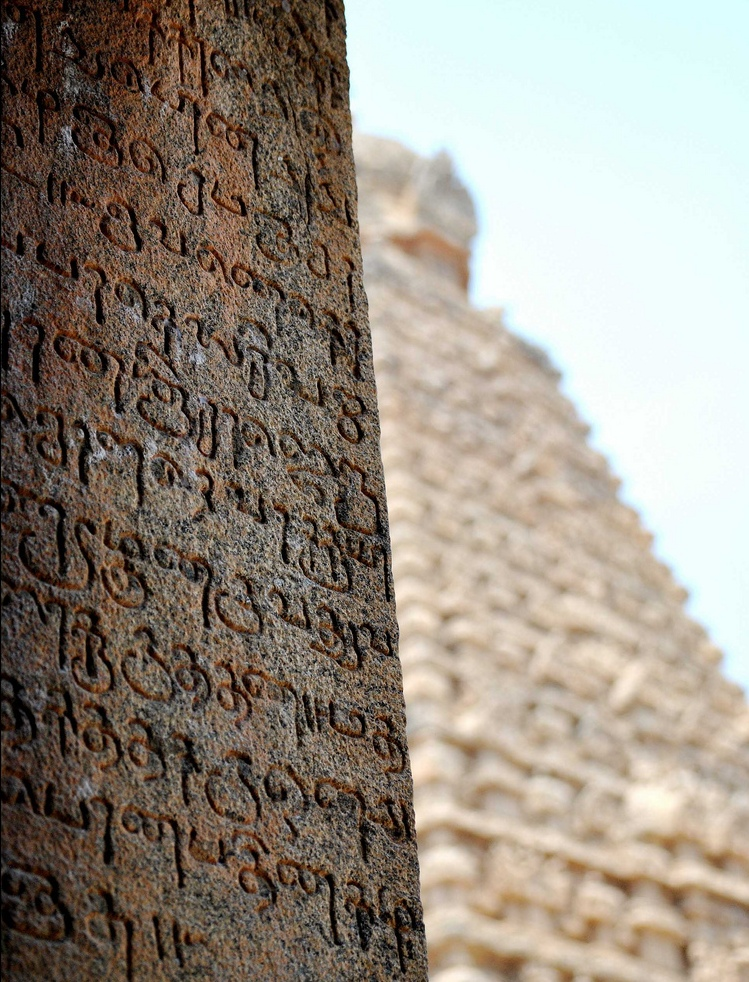
Tanjavur Tamil Inscription

Middle Tamil is the form of the Tamil language that existed from the 8th to the 15th century. The development of Old Tamil into Middle Tamil, which is generally taken to have been completed by the 8th century, was characterised by a number of phonological and grammatical changes despite maintaining grammatical and structural continuity with the previous form of the language. In phonological terms, the most important shifts were the virtual disappearance of the aytam (ஃ), an old phoneme, the coalescence of the alveolar and dental nasals, and the transformation of the alveolar plosive into a rhotic.

In grammar, the most important change was the emergence of the present tense. The present tense evolved out of the verb kil (கில்), meaning "to be possible" or "to befall". In Old Tamil, this verb was used as an aspect marker to indicate that an action was micro-durative, non-sustained or non-lasting, usually in combination with a time marker such as ṉ (ன்). In early Middle Tamil, this usage evolved into a present tense marker – kiṉṟa (கின்ற) – which combined the old aspect and time markers.

Early Middle Tamil is the ancestor of both the Modern Tamil and Malayalam languages. Both languages share multiple common innovations dating to this period. For example, Old Tamil lacks the present tense marker which developed in early Middle Tamil. In addition, Old Tamil lacks the first and second person plural pronouns with the ending kaḷ. It is in the Early Middle Tamil stage that first appears:

Language	Plural Pronouns
Old Tamil	yām, nām, nīr, nīyir
Middle Tamil	nānkaḷ, nām, nīnkaḷ, eṅkaḷ
Malayalam	ñaṅṅaḷ, nām, niṅṅaḷ, nammaḷ

It is notable that Tulu and Havigannada independently or analogously developed pronouns in -(n)k(k)aḷ, reflecting broader areal and historical developments within South Dravidian. Indeed, most features of Malayalam morphology are derivable from a form of speech corresponding to early Middle Tamil.

From the period of the Pallava dynasty onwards, a number of Sanskrit loan-words entered Tamil, particularly in relation to political, religious and philosophical concepts. Sanskrit also influenced Tamil grammar, in the increased use of cases and in declined nouns becoming adjuncts of verbs, and phonology.

The forms of writing in Tamil have developed through years. The Tamil script also changed in the period of Middle Tamil. Tamil Brahmi and Vaṭṭeḻuttu, into which it evolved, were the main scripts used in Old Tamil inscriptions. From the 8th century onwards, however, the Pallavas began using a new script, derived from the Pallava Grantha script which was used to write Sanskrit, which eventually replaced Vaṭṭeḻuttu.

Middle Tamil is attested in many inscriptions, and in a significant body of secular and religious literature. These include the religious poems and songs of the Bhakti poets, such as the Tēvāram verses on Shaivism and Nālāyira Tivya Pirapantam on Vaishnavism, and adaptations of religious legends such as the 12th-century Tamil Ramayana composed by Kamban and the story of 63 shaivite devotees known as Periyapurāṇam. Iraiyaṉār Akapporuḷ, an early treatise on love poetics, and Naṉṉūl, a 12th-century grammar that became the standard grammar of literary Tamil, are also from the Middle Tamil period. Despite the significant amount of grammatical and syntactical change between Old, Middle and Modern Tamil, Tamil demonstrates grammatical continuity across these stages: many characteristics of the later stages of the language have their roots in features of Old Tamil.

There is a famous saying:

திருவாசகத்துக்கு உருகார் ஒரு வாசகத்திற்கும் உருகார்
(tiruvācakattukku urukār ǒru vācakattiṛkum urukār)

translating to 'He whose heart is not melted by Thiruvasagam cannot be melted by any other vasagam [saying]'. The Thiruvasagam was composed by Manikkavasagar.
