= South Dravidian languages =

Southern Dravidian language branch

South Dravidian
- South Dravidian I
- Geographic distribution: South India, Sri Lanka
- Linguistic classification: Dravidian: South Dravidian
- Proto-language: Proto-South Dravidian
- Subdivisions: Tamil–Kannada; Tuluic; Markodi

Language codes
- Glottolog: sout3138

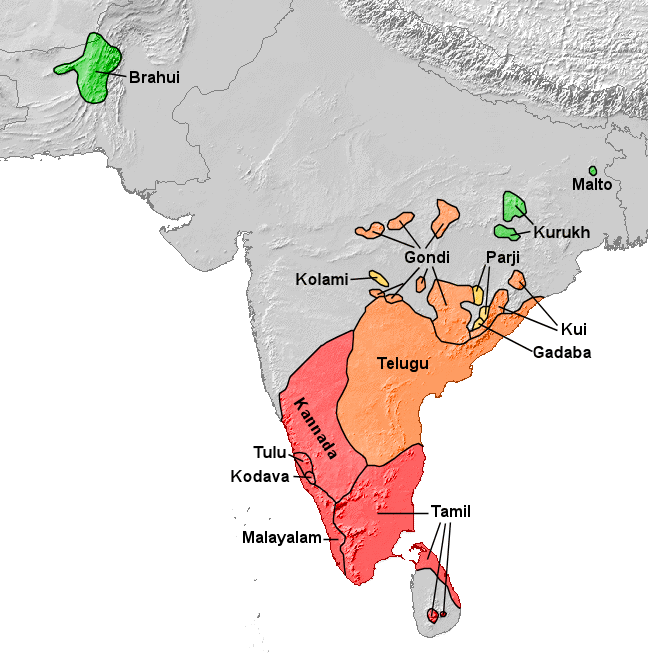

South Dravidian (also called "South Dravidian I") is one of the four major branches of the Dravidian languages family. It includes the literary languages Tamil, Kannada, Malayalam and Tulu, as well as several non-literary languages such as Badaga, Irula, Kota, Kurumba, Toda and Kodava.

Kannada, Malayalam, Tamil and Telugu (South Dravidian II or South-Central Dravidian) are recognized among the official languages of India and are spoken mainly in South India. All four are officially recognized as classical languages by the Government of India, along with Sanskrit and Odia.

== Phonological features ==
Standard Tamil and Malayalam have both retroflex lateral /ɭ/ and retroflex approximant /ɻ/ sounds, whereas most of the remaining like Kannada have merged the central approximant with the lateral. Evidence shows that both retroflex approximant and the retroflex laterals were once (before the 10th century) also present in Kannada. However, all the retroflex approximants changed into retroflex laterals in Kannada later. In Kannada, the bilabial voiceless plosive (/p/) at the beginning of many words has disappeared to produce a glottal fricative (/h/) or has disappeared completely. This change was later taken to other Kannadoid languages and Tuluoid languages like Bellari and Koraga, e.g. Tamil peyar, Kannada hesaru, Bellari/Koraga hudari; Tamil puṟṟu, Jenu Kuruba uṯṯu, Ka. puttu, huttu, uttu.

Tamil-Malayalam and Telugu show the conversion of Voiceless velar plosive (/k/) into Voiceless palatal plosive (/c/) at the beginning of the words (refer to comparative method for details). Kannada and other languages, however, are totally inert to this change and hence the velar plosives are retained as such or with minimum changes in the corresponding words, e.g. Tamil/Malayalam cey, Irula cē(y)-, Toda kïy-, Kannada key/gey, Badaga gī-, Telugu cēyu , Gondi kīānā .

Tulu is characterized by its r/l and s/c/t alternation, for e.g. sarɛ, tarɛ across Tulu dialects compare with Kannada tale. The alveolar ṯ, ṯṯ, nṯ became post alveolar or dental, the singular ones usually becomes a trill in other Dravidian languages, e.g. Tamil oṉṟu, āṟu, nāṟu, nāṟṟam, muṟi, kīṟu; Tulu oñji, āji, nāduni, nāta, {mudipuni, muyipuni}, {kīruni, gīcuni}. The retroflex approximant mostly became a /ɾ/ and also /ɭ, ɖ/, e.g. Tamil ēẓu, puẓu, Tulu {ēḷŭ, ēlŭ, ēḍŭ}, puru.

The vowels have mostly remained the same with the 5 /a, e, i, o, u/ + length; Malayalam and Tulu have an extra /ə̆/ and /ɯ/ respectively. The Nilagiri languages developed a set of centralized vowel around retroflexes and alveolars with Irula having /ɨ, ʉ, ə, ɵ/ + length. Kurumba languages have nasalized vowels, e.g. Jenu Kuruba ã·we, Kannada āme, āve, ēve, ēme, Tamil yāmai, āmai.

== Grammar ==
Most Malayalamoid languages including Malayalam lost the pronounial endings of verbs. Kannada lost clusivity. Old Tamil retained the PD like tense system of past vs non past but most don't currently, most have past, present, future. Sholaga has a PD like tense system of a verb being finished vs unfinished. Common plural marker is -kaḷ(u) in Tamil-Kannada while Tulu uses -ḷŭ, -kuḷŭ, certain Malayalamoid languages use other methods like -ya in Ravula and having kuṟe before the word in Eranadan. Most languages outside Kannadoid have plural pronouns as singular form suffixed with the plural marker, e.g., Kannada nīvu (PD *nīm), Malayalam niṅṅaḷ (nīn-kaḷ), Tulu nikuḷu.

== Classification and terminology ==
The Dravidian languages form a close-knit family. Four subgroups are generally accepted: South Dravidian, South-Central Dravidian, Central Dravidian and North Dravidian. Most scholars agree that the South Dravidian and South-Central Dravidian branches (called "Tamil-Tulu" and "Telugu-Kui" in Zvelebil 1990:56) are more closely related to each other than to the other branches of the Dravidian languages. For this reason, Krishnamurti suggested the alternative terms South Dravidian I for the former branch and South Dravidian II for the latter.

South Dravidian is classified internally into two subbranches: Tamil–Kannada and Tulu. The languages that constitute the Tamil–Kannada branch are Tamil, Kannada, Malayalam, Irula, Toda, Kota, Kodava, and Badaga and the languages that constitute the Tulu branch are Tulu, Koraga, Kudiya, Bellari.

According to R. C. Hiremath, Director of International School of Dravidian Linguistics in Trivandrum, the separation of Tamil and Kannada into independent languages from the Tamil–Kannada inner branch started with the separation of Tulu in about 1500 BCE and completed in about 300 BCE.

- South Dravidian (= "South Dravidian I")
  - Tamil–Kannada
              - Tamil languages, including Tamil
              - Malayalam languages, including Malayalam
            - Irula 11,870 (2011 census)
          - Kodava 113,857 (2011 census)
        - Toda 1,600 (2001 census)
      - Kota 930 (2001 census)
    - Kannadoid languages, including Kannada and Badaga
    - Koraga 45-50 (2018)
    - Tulu 1,850,000 (2011 census)
    - Kudiya 2,800 (2007)

Glottolog v5.4 splits South Dravidian I into three primary branches, though aside from the addition of the language of the Mavilan tribe as a third branch and placement of Kodava closer to Tamil–Malayalam, it is broadly similar to Krishnamurti (2003):

- South Dravidian I
              - Tamiloid
              - Malayalamoid
              - Kakkala (unclassified)
            - Kodava
            - Urali of Idukki
              - Attapady Kurumba
              - Muduga
            - Irula of the Nilgiri
        - Toda
      - Kota
      - Badaga
      - Kannadoid
    - Koraga
      - Korra Koraga
      - Mudu Koraga
      - Tulu
      - Kudiya
    - Bellari
  - Mavilan
