= Old Tamil =

Form of Tamil used from 300 BCE to 700 CE

- Paḻantamiḻ
- 𑀧𑀵𑀦𑁰𑀢𑀫𑀺𑀵𑁰 பழந்தமிழ்
- The word "paḻantamiḻ" written in modern Tamil Brahmi typeface
- Pronunciation: [paɻan̪ t̪amiɻ]
- Native to: Tamiḻakam
- Region: Ancient Tamilakam spanning the modern-day regions of India: Tamil Nadu; Kerala; parts of Andhra Pradesh; parts of Karnataka
- Ethnicity: Tamils
- Era: 3rd BCE - 7th CE
- Language family: Dravidian: Southern Dravidian languages; Proto-Tamil–Kannada; Proto-Tamil–Kodagu; Old Tamil
- Writing system: Tamil-Brahmi (3rd B.C. - 4th C.E.); Vaṭṭeḻuttu (4th C.E. - 11th C.E.); Pallava script (4th C.E. - 7th C.E.)

Language codes
- ISO 639-3: oty
- Glottolog: oldt1248
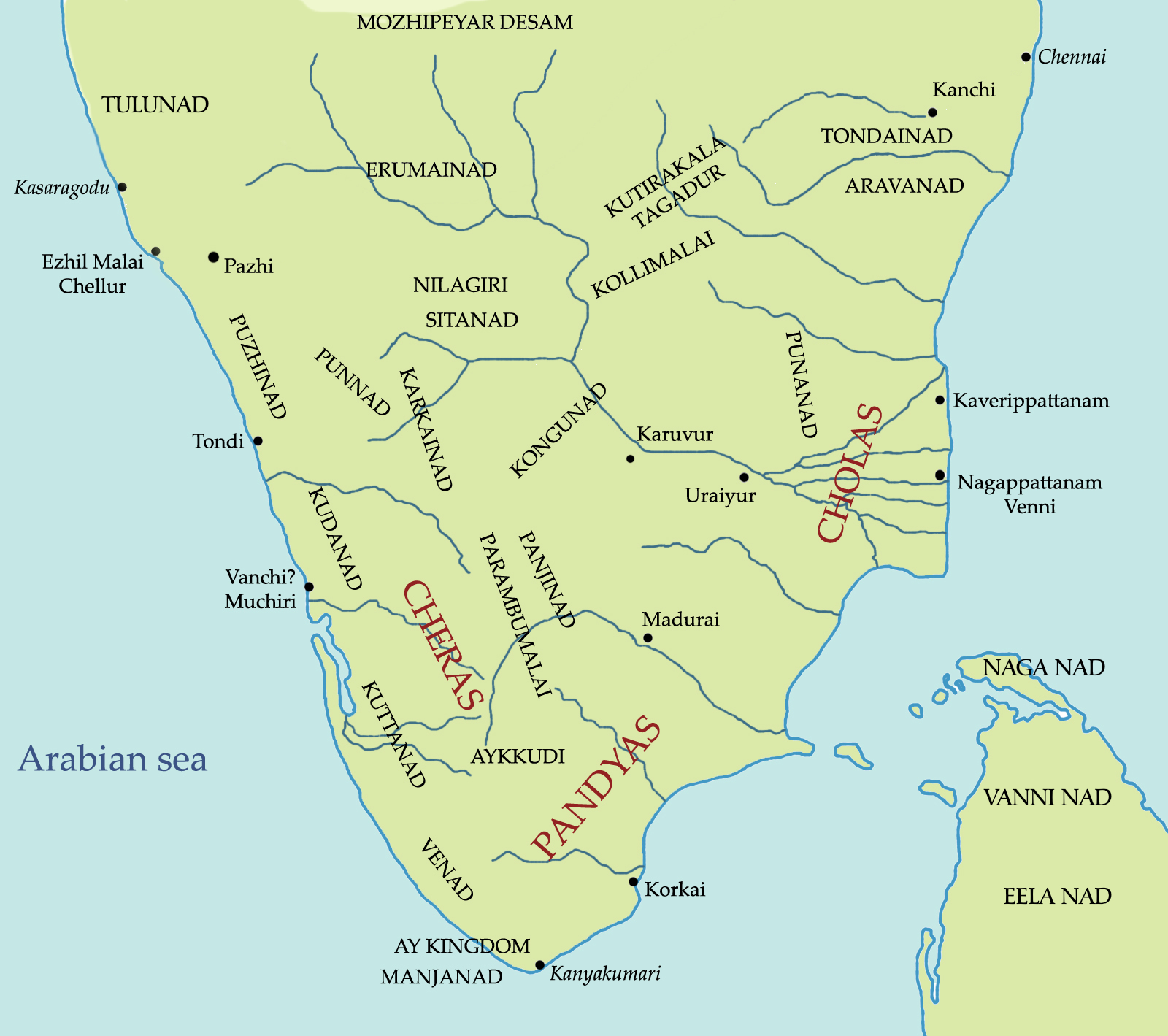
- Tamilakam in the Sangam Period

Old Tamil (Old Tamil: 𑀧𑀵𑀦𑁰𑀢𑀫𑀺𑀵𑁰 , Tamil: பழந்தமிழ், romanized: paḻantamiḻ ) is the form of the Tamil language used from the 3rd century BCE to the 7th century CE, following Proto-Tamil and preceding Middle Tamil. The earliest records in Old Tamil are inscriptions from between the 3rd and 1st century BCE in caves and on pottery, written in the Tamil-Brahmi variant of the Brahmi script. The earliest long text in Old Tamil is the Tolkāppiyam, an early work on Tamil grammar and poetics, whose oldest layers could be as old as the mid-2nd century BCE. Old Tamil preserves many features of Proto-Dravidian, the reconstructed common ancestor of the Dravidian languages, including the inventory of consonants, the syllable structure, and various grammatical features.

== History ==
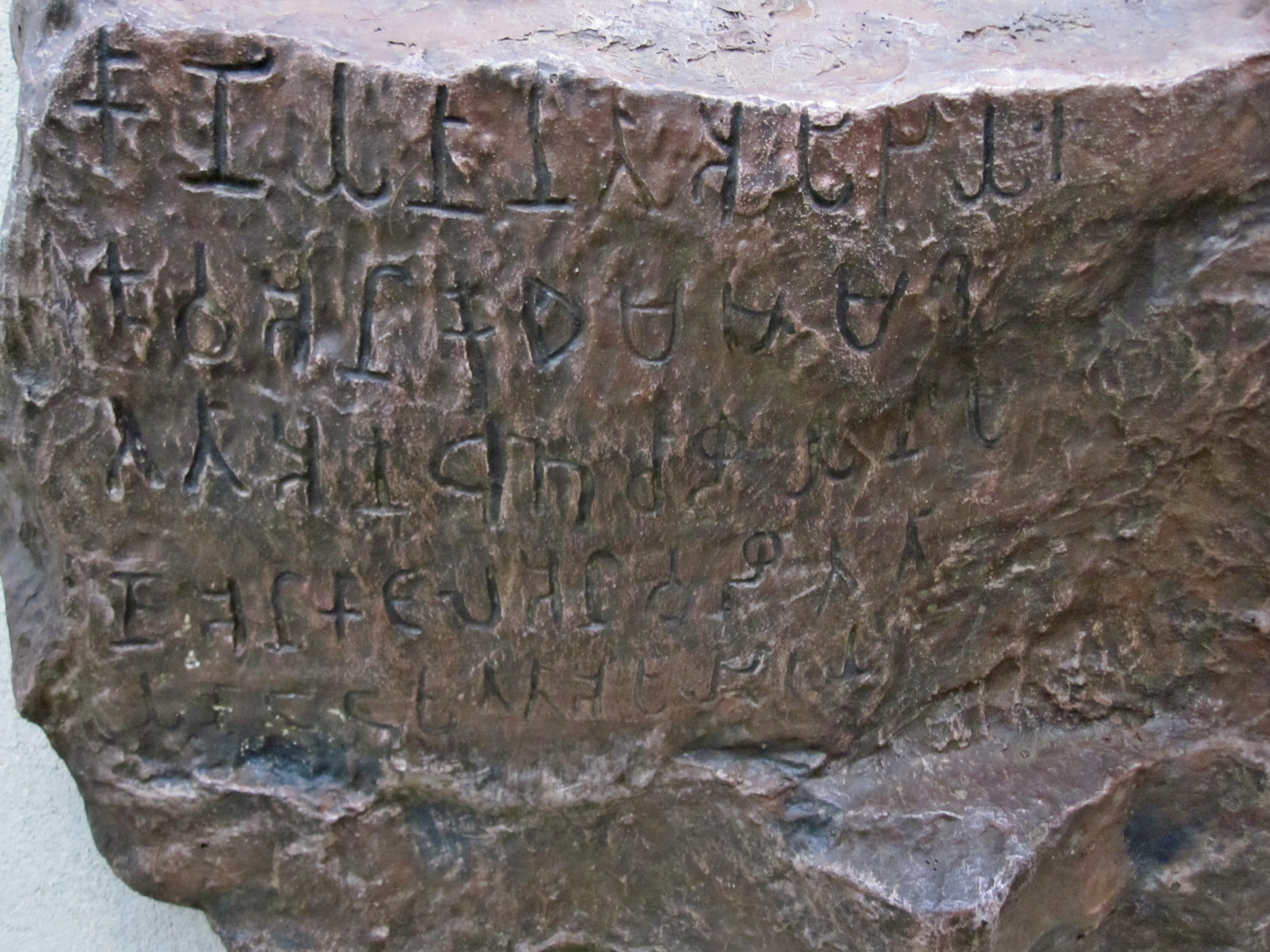
Mangulam 3rd-century BCE Tamil Brahmi inscription in Madurai.

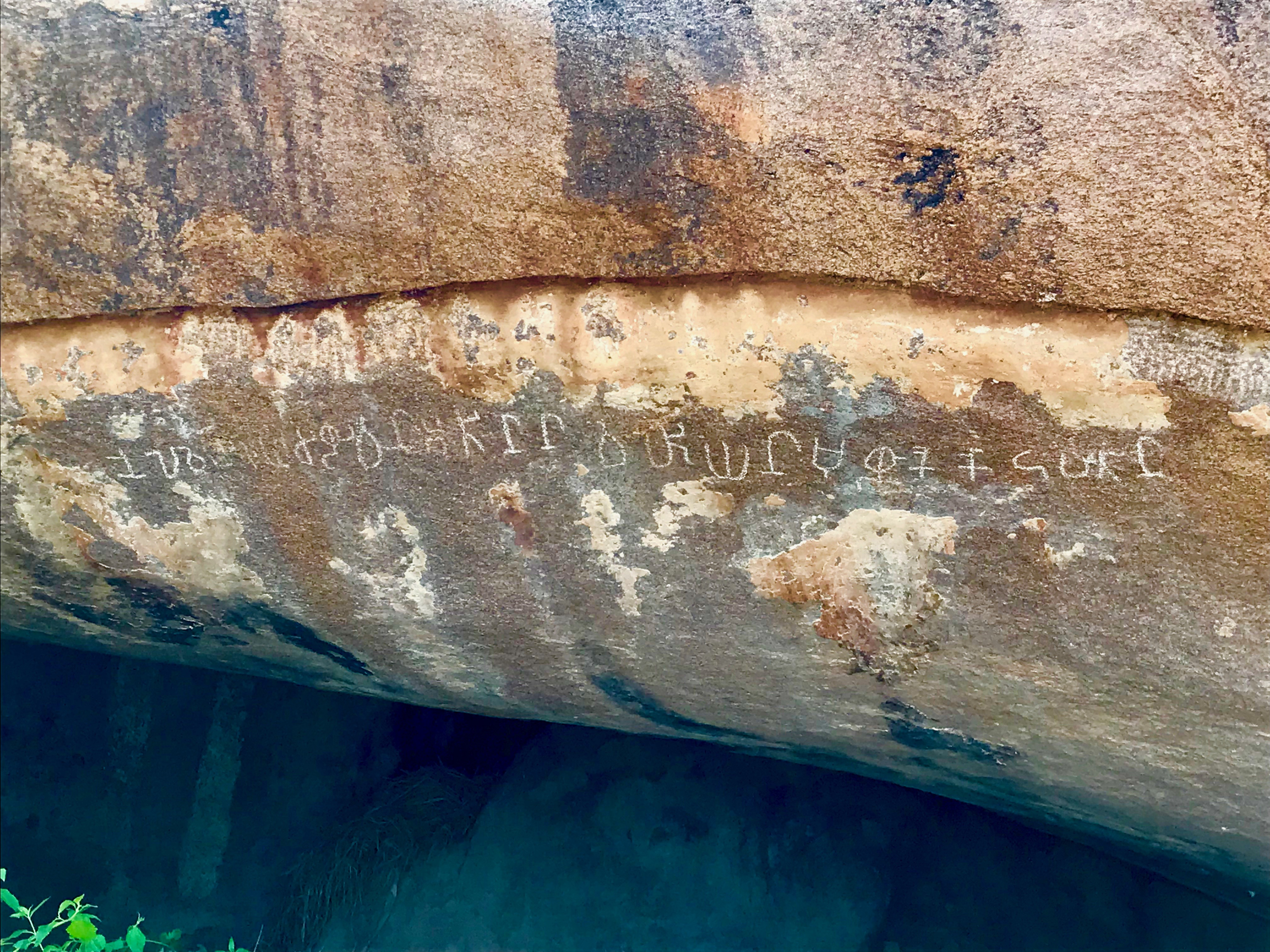
A 2nd-century BCE Tamil Brahmi inscription from Arittapatti, Madurai India. The southern state of Tamil Nadu has emerged as a major source of Brahmi inscriptions in Old Tamil dated between 3rd to 1st centuries BCE.

According to Bhadriraju Krishnamurti, Tamil, as a Dravidian language, descends from Proto-Dravidian, a proto-language. Linguistic reconstruction suggests that Proto-Dravidian was spoken around the third millennium BCE, possibly in the region around the lower Godavari river basin in peninsular India. The material evidence suggests that the speakers of Proto-Dravidian were of the culture associated with the Neolithic complexes of South India. The earliest epigraphic attestations of Tamil are generally taken to have been written from the 2nd century BCE.

Among Indian languages, Tamil has the most ancient non-Sanskritic Indian literature. Scholars categorise the attested history of the language into three periods: Old Tamil (300 BCE–700 CE), Middle Tamil (700–1600) and Modern Tamil (1600–present). In November 2007, an excavation at Quseir al Qadim revealed Ancient Egyptian pottery dating back to first century BCE with ancient Tamil Brahmi inscriptions. There are a number of apparent Tamil loanwords in Hebrew dating to before 500 BCE, the oldest attestation of the language. John Guy states that Tamil was the lingua franca for early maritime traders from India.

Tamils began to trade with Greece, Rome, Egypt, China, Southeast Asia, Sri Lanka, and Tibet. Their ports were Tondi, Musiri and Comari, Colchi, Poduke and Sopatma. This was done during the period of Tamil independence from 600 BCE to 300 CE. The different types of ships that would go into the port were small vessels, large vessels, and ocean-going vessels. They received the largest number the Roman coins-hoards in Tamil. This ranges from different emperors of Rome as their dates on the coins and as well as the emperors on the coins are different. This trade even continued to the end of the Roman Empire and continued into the time of the Byzantine Empire. The Tamils also traded along the Red Sea as goods such as potsherds were found in excavated sites. Rice and salt were popular goods that came out as exports as well as used as currency for bargaining. They were used as a means of bartering as they were able to transport large amounts and the demand for these items was always there. There was a port called Cholas that traded with the west and the Malaya coast.

There were large amounts of Roulette potteries and Roman coins were found in a brick jetty that they would put items into so they would be ready for when they needed to unload them a mound in Arikamedu with Rouletted ware, amphorae, conical jars, agate, and chalcedony. Two of the port cities were later destroyed by tsunamis. These were the cities of Thenmadurai and Kapatapuram. Archaeologist T. Satyamurth found 160 urns at their dig site. Dr. Jagor found 9000 objectives such as pottery, weapons, vessels, ornaments, stone beads, clothes, bones, ivory, sandalwood, and stone implements for grinding. The population wore cotton clothes and adorned the neck with ornaments made of beads, copper, and bronze.

== Literary work ==
Many literary works in Old Tamil have also survived. These include a corpus of 2,381 poems collectively known as Sangam literature. These poems are usually dated to between the 3rd century BCE and 5th century CE, which makes them the oldest extant body of literature in India. Other literary works in Old Tamil include Thirukural, Silappatikaram and Maṇimēkalai, and a number of ethical and didactic texts, written between the 5th and 8th centuries. (Note: The dating of Sangam literature and the identification of its language with Old Tamil was questioned by Herman Tieken who argued that the works are better understood as 9th century Pāṇṭiyan dynasty compositions, written in an archaising style to make them seem older than they were. Tieken's dating has, however, been criticised by multiple reviewers of his work.)

"Tamil is categorized as a classical language as it has a considerably extensive written tradition that is known for predating other classical works in India by over a thousand years." In addition, to its thousands of years of history as a literary language, notably during the Sangam period. A major distinction in this regard, is that Tamil is classified as a Dravidian language, making it the oldest written tradition not descended from Sanskrit in India.

The term Sangam refers to multiple periods in which Sangam Tamil literature originates. Notably, there are to be considered three primary Sangam periods, as well as a Post Sangam period. However, all Sangam literature available to us dates from the third Sangam period, as well as the Post Sangam period. The exact dates of Sangam publications are debated by scholars. "There are two primary styles defined through Sangam literature, Akam and Puram. Through Akam, aspects of love and romantic feelings are portrayed through five distinct categories, each relating to a unique landscape. Puram typically displays aspects of war and politics."

Sangam literature can be found from its first period around 250 BCE–200 CE. Regarding their pretexts, Puram poems most notably target specific morals that the author wishes to convey. One of the most notable works of Sangam literature is the Tirukkural, and serves as a prime example among other Sangam didactic texts. The Tirukkural is known for being a text in which the reader is taught morals in a poetic manner, typically through the use of couplets.

== Features ==
Old Tamil preserved many features of Proto-Dravidian, including inventory of consonants, the syllable structure, and various grammatical features. Amongst these was the absence of a distinct present tense – like Proto-Dravidian, Old Tamil only had two tenses, the past and the "non-past". Old Tamil verbs also had a distinct negative conjugation (e.g. kāṇēṉ [kaːɳeːn] 𑀓𑀸𑀡𑁂𑀷𑁆 (காணேன்)) "I do not see", kāṇōm [kaːɳoːm] (𑀓𑀸𑀡𑁄𑀫𑁆 (காணோம்) "we do not see"). Nouns could take pronominal suffixes like verbs to express ideas: e.g. peṇṭirēm [peɳɖiɾeːm] 𑀧𑁳𑀡𑁆𑀝𑀺𑀭𑁂𑀫𑁆 (பெண்டிரேம்) "we are women" formed from peṇṭir [peɳɖiɾ] 𑀧𑁳𑀡𑁆𑀝𑀺𑀭𑁆 (பெண்டிர்) "women" and the first person plural marker -ēm -𑀏𑀫𑁆 (-ஏம்). Despite the significant amount of grammatical and syntactical change between Old, Middle and Modern Tamil, Tamil demonstrates grammatical continuity across these stages: many characteristics of the later stages of the language have their roots in features of Old Tamil.

== Phonology ==
Old Tamil, the earliest attested branch of South Dravidian has preserved an inventory of 17 consonants very similar to Proto-Dravidian: /p t ṯ c ṭ k m n ñ ṇ, r ẓ l ḷ y w *H/. In writing, alveolar /n/ and dental /n̠/ were distinguished, however there is little evidence to suggest a phonemic contrast. Unlike modern Tamil, consonants could occur word finally. There was no voicing distinction. Medial plosives were allophonically lenis and voiced following nasals.

The oldest depiction of Old Tamil's phonology is found in Tolkappiyam. This early record of the language dives into the sounds of the language as well as allophones which are used to help understand adjacent phonemes. According to a rough translation from Tolkappiyam, "It will be evident on careful observation that all the sounds (in the Tamil language) are but the results of the modifications which the air undergoes in starting from naval, and passing through the eight parts- chest, neck, head, tongue, hard palate, teeth, lips, and nose."

The Tolkappiyam describes the language as having thirty phonemes, including "linear" phonemes listed from a to n̠ and three "non-linear" or non-autonomous phonemes, which were described as occurring simultaneously with other adjacent phonemes. Two of these, iॱ and uॱ may have been realised as extra short vowels, and only occurred when preceded by particular consonants. The other non-linear phoneme, commonly called āytam could only occur when followed by one of the six plosives present in Old Tamil, /p t t̠ c ṭ k/, and preceded by a short vowel. The phonemic realisation of āytam is unclear. In modern pronunciations of literary texts, it is pronounced as a voiced or voiceless guttural fricative, however this was likely not the Old Tamil pronunciation. The Tolkappiyam describes it as having the same place of articulation of the plosive following it, which prevents the assignment of a particular place of articulation to āytam. It largely occurred in external and internal sandhi, as well as a few non-compound words. In the oldest literature, the āytum in sandhi occurred as a variant of gemination of the following plosive. Āytam was derived from the Proto-Dravidian laryngeal *H

== Writing system ==
Tamil's writing system is widely believed to be inspired by the Asokan Brahmi system, which is the original Indian script that all modern Indian script derived from. There are 5 main categories of writing system which are the alphabet, abugida, abjad, syllabary, and semanto-phonetic. Old Tamil's writing system fits under the abugida. The letters in the Old Tamil abugida all appear to take the form of shapes like squares and circles. In the language every consonant is combined with a vowel for example NA is the letter n in the English alphabet. If a letter in a word is followed by the same vowel it is written twice to distinguish between the constants adjacent vowel and the vowel following the consonant-vowel combination. In Tamil, constants occur usually at the end and the middle of words. There is an exception to this rule that occurs when a word starts with a vowel, and in this case, a character representing a singular syllable is used.

== Regional dialects ==
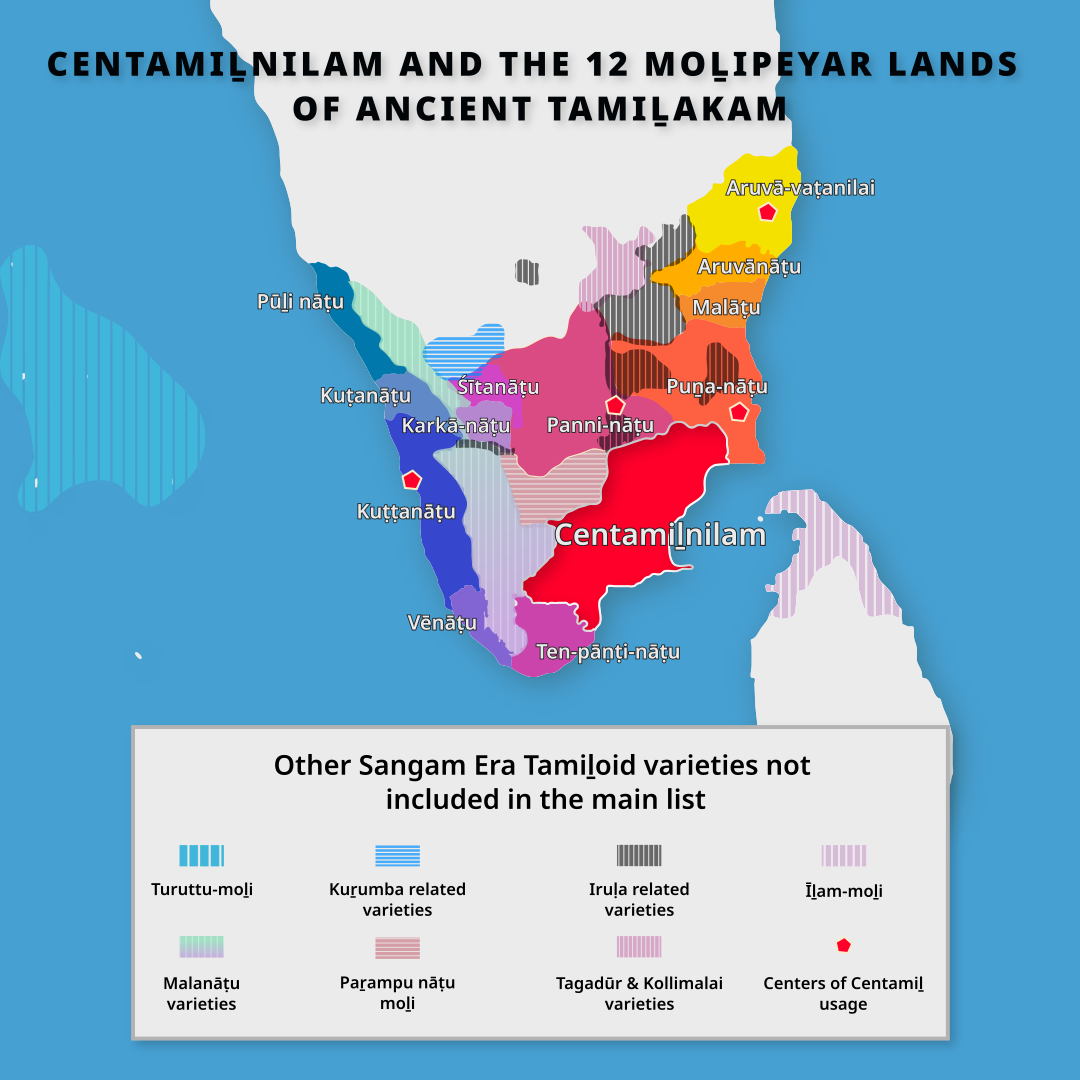
The 12 mozhipeyar regions of Ancient Tamilakam

The Tolkappiyam mentions about 12 moḻipeyar lands apart from the region where Centamil was spoken. Tolkappiyam 881 also mentions about dialectical words called Ticaicol. Ulloor S. Parameswara Iyer in his work, Kerala Sahithya Charithram names these regions. Senavaraiyar and Mayilainatar, both interpret almost similar names for these twelve Tamil dialectical regions of Old Tamil.

== See also ==
- Old Tamil words attested in Hebrew
- Old Tamil words attested in Ancient Greek

== Sources ==
- Iravatham, Mahadevan (2003). Early Tamil Epigraphy. Harvard University Department of Sanskrit and Indian Studies. ISBN 978-0-674-01227-1.
- Iravatham, Mahadevan (1970). Tamil-Brahmi Inscriptions. State Department of Archaeology, Government of Tamil Nadu.
- Krishnamurti, Bhadriraju (2003). The Dravidian Languages. Cambridge University Press. ISBN 978-05-11-48687-6.
- Lehmann, Thomas (1998). Sanford, Steever (ed.). The Dravidian Languages. Routledge. ISBN 978-04-15-41267-4.
- Ollett, Andrew (2017). Language of the Snakes. University of California Press. JSTOR 10.1525/j.ctt1w8h1vk.
- Southworth, Franklin C. (2005), Linguistic archaeology of South Asia, Routledge, ISBN 978-0-415-33323-8
- Spuler, Bertold (1975). Handbook of Oriental Studies. Brill Academic. p. 44. ISBN 90-04-04190-7.
- Steever, Sanford (1998), "Introduction", in Steever, Sanford (ed.), The Dravidian Languages, London: Routledge, pp. 1–39, ISBN 978-0-415-10023-6
- Tharu, Susie; Lalita, K., eds. (1991), Women Writing in India: 600 B.C. to the present – Vol. 1: 600 B.C. to the early twentieth century, Feminist Press, ISBN 978-1-55861-027-9
- Tharu, Susie; Lalita, Ke, eds. (1998). Women Writing in India: 600 B.C. to the Present, II: The Twentieth Century. CUNY. ISBN 978-15-58-61028-6.
- Tieken, Herman (2001), Kavya in South India: Old Tamil Cankam Poetry, Gonda Indological Studies, Volume X, Groningen: Egbert Forsten Publishing, ISBN 978-90-6980-134-6
- Zvelebil, Kamil (1973). The Smile of Murugan: On Tamil Literature of South India. Brill. ISBN 978-90-04-03591-1.
