= Kota language (India) =

Dravidian language of India

Kota
- Kō mānt
- கோத்தர்
- Native to: India
- Region: Nilgiri Hills
- Ethnicity: Kotas
- Native speakers: (930 cited 2001 census)
- Language family: Dravidian: Southern; Southern I; Tamil–Kannada; Tamil–Kota; Kota
- Writing system: Tamil script

Language codes
- ISO 639-3: kfe
- Glottolog: kota1263
- ELP: Kota (India)
- Kota is classified as Critically Endangered according to the UNESCO Atlas of the World's Languages in Danger

Kota (IPA: [koːt̪aː]) is a language of the Dravidian family with about 900 native speakers in the Nilgiri hills of Tamil Nadu state, India. It is spoken mainly by the tribal Kota people. In the late 1800s, the native speaking population was about 1,100. In 1990, the population was only 930, out of an ethnic population of perhaps 1,400, despite the great increase in the population of the area. The language is 'critically endangered' due to the greater social status of neighbouring languages. The Kota language may have originated from Tamil-Kannada and is closely related to the Toda language. The Kota population is about 2500. The origin of the name Kota is derived from the Dravidian root word 'Ko' meaning Mountain. Traditionally Kota and Toda are seen as from a single branch Toda-Kota which separated from Tamil-Kota but recently Krishnamurti considers it to have diverged first from Tamil-Kota and later Toda as it does not have the centralized vowels characterized for Tamil-Toda.

== Phonology ==
=== Vowels ===
	Front		Central		Back	
	short	long	short	long	short	long
High	i	iː			u	uː
Mid	e	eː			o	oː
Low			a	aː		

Kota notably doesn't have central vowels like the other Nilgiri languages. Toda, the closest language, does however.

=== Consonants ===
Consonants
		Labial	Dental	Alveolar	Retroflex	Post-alv./ Palatal	Velar
Nasal		m	n̪		ɳ		ŋ
Plosive	voiceless	p	t̪		ʈ	t̠	k
Plosive	voiced	b	d̪		ɖ	d̠	ɡ
Affricate	voiceless					t͡ʃ	
Affricate	voiced					d͡ʒ	
Liquid	median	ʋ		ɾ		j	
Liquid	lateral			l	ɭ		

[s] and [z] occur in free variation with /t͡ʃ/ and /d͡ʒ/. [ʂ] occurs as an allophone of /s/ before retroflexes.
