= Toda language =

Dravidian language of Nilgiri Hills, India

Toda
- Native to: India
- Region: North Western Tamil Nadu (Nilgiris)
- Ethnicity: Toda people
- Native speakers: (1,600 cited 2001)
- Language family: Dravidian: Southern; Southern I; Tamil–Kannada; Tamil–Kota; Tamil–Toda; Toda
- Writing system: Unwritten; Provisionally written in Tamil script (Brahmic) and Latin

Language codes
- ISO 639-3: tcx
- Glottolog: toda1252
- ELP: Toda
- UNESCO Atlas of the World's Languages in Danger

Toda (Toda: [t̪od͡z]) is a indigenous Dravidian language, spoken by the Toda people, who live in the Nilgiri Hills of South India. It is noted for its fricatives and trills. The language is considered to have originated from the Toda-Kota subgroup of South Dravidian. Linguist Bhadriraju Krishnamurti does not consider the existence of a single Toda-Kota branch and says Kota split first and Toda later as Kota doesn't have the centralized vowels of other Tamil-Toda languages.

== Phonology ==
=== Vowels ===
Toda language has sixteen vowels, an unusually large number for a Dravidian language. There are eight vowel qualities, each of which may occur long or short. There is little difference in quality between the long and short vowels, except for /e/, which occurs as [e] when short and as [eː] or [æː] when long.

	Front				Central/Back			
	unrounded		rounded		unrounded		rounded	
	short	long	short	long	short	long	short	long
Close	i	iː	y	yː	ɯ	ɯː	u	uː
Mid	e	eː			ɤ	ɤː	o	oː
Open					a	aː		

=== Consonants ===
Toda has an unusually large number of fricatives and trills. Its seven places of articulation are the most for any Dravidian language. The voiceless laterals are true fricatives, not voiceless approximants; the retroflex lateral is highly unusual among the world's languages.

Voiceless fricatives are allophonically voiced intervocalically in Toda. There are also the invariably voiced fricatives /ʒ, ʐ, ɣ/, though the latter is marginal. The nasals and /r̠, ɽr, j/ are allophonically devoiced or partially devoiced in final position or next to voiceless consonants.

		Labial	Dental/ Alveolar		Postalveolar		Retroflex/ Palatal		Velar
		Labial	plain	sib./pal.	plain	pal.	plain	pal.	Velar
Nasal		m			n̠		ɳ		
Plosive/ Affricate	voiceless	p	t̪	t̪s̪	t̠	tʃ	ʈ		k
Plosive/ Affricate	voiced	b	d̪	d̪z̪	d̠	dʒ	ɖ		ɡ
Fricative	voiceless	f	θ̪͆	s̪	s̠	ʃ	ʂ		x
Fricative	voiced					ʒ	ʐ		(ɣ)
Fricative	lateral		ɬ̪				ꞎ		
Approximant			l̪				ɭ	j	w
Trill			r̘	r̘ʲ	r̠	r̠ʲ	ɽr	ɽrʲ	

All of these consonants may occur in word-medial and word-final positions. However, only a restricted set occur word-initially. These are /p, t̪, k, f, s̪, m, n̠, r̘, l̪, j, w/.

Unlike the other dental consonants, /θ/ is interdental. Similarly, /f/ is labiodental whereas the other labials are bilabial.

The palatalized rhotics are only mentioned in Spajić, Ladefoged & Bhaskararao (1996); other descriptions, such as those from Emeneau (1984) and Krishnamurti (2003), only include the three plain trills.

Apical consonants are either alveolar or postalveolar. The actual feature that distinguishes /r̘/ and /r̠/ is uncertain. They have the same primary place of articulation. Spajić and colleagues have found that the rhotic that may occur word initially (erroneously called "dental" in previous literature, perhaps because Dravidian coronals tend to be dental by default) has a secondary articulation, which they have tentatively identified as advanced tongue root until further measurements can be made. This analysis is assumed in the transcription /r̘/.

Another difference between them is that /r̘/ is the least strongly trilled, most often occurring with a single contact. However, unlike a flap, multiple contacts are normal, if less common, and /r̘/ is easily distinguishable from the other trills when they are all produced with the same number of contacts.

The retroflex consonants are subapical. Retroflex /ɽr/ is more strongly trilled than the other rhotics. However, it is not purely retroflex. Although the tongue starts out in a sub-apical retroflex position, trilling involves the tip of the tongue, and this causes it to move forward toward the alveolar ridge. This means that the retroflex trill gives a preceding vowel retroflex coloration the way other retroflex consonants do, but that the vibration itself is not much different from the other trills.

== Grammar ==
=== Verbal morphology ===
As described by Murray B. Emeneau, in the book Toda Grammar and Texts, the entire Toda verbal system is based on the addition of many suffixes to the two base verb stems, stem 1 (henceforth, S_{1}) and stem 2 (henceforth, S_{2}). There are fifteen classes of verbs in Toda, each of which uses one of four suffixes to form its S_{2} from its S_{1}. A short summary is given below:

Toda Verb Classes
Class	Example	Suffix	S_{2}
Ia	ko·ṭ- "to show"	-y-	ko·ṭy-
Ib	koc- "to bite"	-y- (c- > č-)	koč-
Ic	oɀ- "to fear"	-y- (ɀ- > j-)	oj-
IIa	nen- "to think of"	-θ-	nenθ-
IIb	kïy- "to do"	-θ- (-y > -s)	kïs-
IIc	ïr- "to sit"	-θ- (-r > -θ)	ïθ-
IIIa	kwïṛ- "to give (to 3rd)"	-t-	kwïṛt-
IIIb	ko·y- "to bear fruit"	-t- (-y > -c)	ko·c-
IIIc	soy- "to die"	-t- (-y > -t)	sot-
IIId	kaɬ- "to learn"	-t- (-ɬ > -ṯ)^{1}	kaṯ-
IIIe	wïṟ- "to undertake"	-t- (-ṟ/-l > -t-)	wït-
IVa	kwïḷ- "to hatch"	-d-	kwïḷd-
IVb	mi·y- "to bathe"	-d- (-y > -d)	mi·d-
IVc	sal- "to belong to"	-d- (-l > -d)	sad-
V (irregular)	pï·x- "to go," o·x- "to become"	-	pi·-, o·y-

^{1}Emeneau lists the rule "S_{1} -ṟ/-ɬ/-ṛ/-ꞎ/-ḍ/-x + -t- = S_{2} -ṯ/-ṯ/-ṭ/-ṭ/-ṭ/-k; S_{1} -r/-l/-n/-s̠/-ḷ/-ṇ + -t- = S_{1} -d/-ḏ/-ḏ/-ḏ/-ḍ/-ḍ" for this class.

To each of these stems, further suffixes may be added to create verb forms indicating different tenses and moods. The following table summarizes them:

Toda Verbal Inflection
Function	1sg.	1pl. excl.	1pl. incl.	2sg.	2pl.	3
Present-future I	S_{2}-pen	S_{2}-pem	S_{2}-pum	S_{2}-py	S_{2}-tš	S_{2}-t
Present-future II	S_{2}-n	S_{2}-m	S_{2}-m	S_{2}-ty	S_{2}-tš	S_{2}-u
Past I	S_{2}-špen	S_{2}-špem	S_{2}-špum	S_{2}-špy	S_{2}-š	S_{2}-č
Past II	S_{2}-šn	S_{2}-šm	S_{2}-šm	S_{2}-č	S_{2}-š	S_{2}-šk
Tenseless	S_{2}-en (Class I: S_{1}-nen)	S_{2}-em (Class I: S_{1}-nem)	S_{2}-um (Class I: S_{1}-num)	S_{2}-y (Class I: S_{1}-ny)	S_{2}-š (Class I: S_{1}-nš)	?
Dubitative	S_{1}-špen	S_{1}-špem	S_{1}-špum	S_{1}-špy	S_{1}-š	S_{1}-č
Voluntative	S_{1}-kin	S_{1}-kim	S_{1}-ku	S_{1}-ky	S_{1}-kš	S_{1}-kθ
Imperative	-	-	-	S_{1}	S_{1}-š	S_{1}-mo·
Negative	S_{1}-en	S_{1}-em	S_{1}-um	S_{1}-y	S_{1}-š	S_{1}-oθ
Negative voluntative	S_{1}-šn	S_{1}-šm	S_{1}-šm	S_{1}-č	S_{1}-š	S_{1}-šk
Negative imperative	-	-	-	S_{2}-oṭ	S_{2}-oṭṣ	-

== See also ==
- E. E. Speight, who was compiling Toda grammar in the period before his death

== Bibliography ==
- Emeneau, Murray B. (1984). Toda Grammar and Texts. American Philosophical Society, Memoirs Series, 155. American Philosophical Society. ISBN 978-0-871-69155-2.
- Spajić, Siniša; Ladefoged, Peter; Bhaskararao, P. (1994). The rhotics of Toda. UCLA Working Papers in Phonetics 87: Fieldwork Studies of Targeted Languages II.
- Spajić, Siniša; Ladefoged, Peter; Bhaskararao, P. (1996). "The trills of Toda". Journal of the International Phonetic Association. 26 (1). Cambridge University Press: 1–21. JSTOR 44526193.
- Krishnamurti, Bhadriraju (2003). The Dravidian Languages. Cambridge Language Surveys (1 ed.). Cambridge: Cambridge University Press. ISBN 978-0-521-77111-5.
- Bhaskararao, Peri (2025). Toda Dictionary (1 ed.). Tokyo: Research Institute for Languages and Cultures of Asia and Africa, Tokyo University of Foreign Studies. ISBN 9784863376007.
