= Proto-Dravidian language =

Reconstructed common ancestor of the Dravidian languages

Proto-Dravidian
- Reconstruction of: Dravidian languages
- Region: Indian subcontinent, exact region unknown
- Era: c. 4000–3000 BCE
- Lower-order reconstructions: Proto South-Dravidian; Proto South-Central-Dravidian; Proto Central-Dravidian; Proto North-Dravidian

Proto-Dravidian is the linguistic reconstruction of the common ancestor of the Dravidian languages native to the Indian subcontinent. It is thought to have differentiated into Proto-North Dravidian, Proto-Central Dravidian, and Proto-South Dravidian, although the date of diversification is still debated.

== History ==
As a proto-language, Proto-Dravidian is not itself attested in historical records. Its modern conception is based solely on reconstruction. It is suggested that the language was spoken in the 4th millennium BCE, and started evolving into various branches around 3rd-millennium BCE.

The origin and territory of the Proto-Dravidian speakers is uncertain, but some suggestions have been made based on the reconstructed Proto-Dravidian vocabulary. The reconstruction has been done on the basis of cognate words present in the different branches (Northern, Central and Southern) of the Dravidian language family.

According to Fuller (2007), the botanical vocabulary of Proto-Dravidian is characteristic of the dry deciduous forests of central and peninsular India. For the Southern Dravidians, this region extends from Saurashtra and Central India to South India. It thus represents the general area in which the Dravidians were living before the separation of branches.

According to Franklin Southworth (2005), the Proto-Dravidian vocabulary is characteristic of a rural economy based on agriculture, animal husbandry and hunting. However, there are some indications of a society more complex than a rural one:

- Words for an upper storey (mel) and beam (paṭṭa)
- Metallurgy
- Trade
- Payment of dues (possibly taxes or contributions to religious ceremonies)
- Social stratification

This evidence is not sufficient to determine with certainty the territory of the Proto-Dravidians. These characteristics can be accommodated within multiple contemporary cultures, including:

- 2nd and 3rd millennium BCE Neolithic-Chalcolithic cultures of Mehrgarh and present-day western Rajasthan, Deccan and other parts of the peninsula.
- Early Indus Valley civilisation sites in Pakistan and later ones in the Saurashtra (Sorath) area of present-day Gujarat.
- Asko Parpola identifies Proto-North Dravidians with the Indus Valley civilization (IVC) and the Meluhha people mentioned in Sumerian records, and has suggested that the word "Meluhha" derives from the Dravidian words mel(u)-akam ("highland country, high abode").
- Loan words identified in Sumerian such as the words for ivory (zuamsi) and sesame (ĝeš-i₃) are considered to be derived from Proto-Dravidian and spread from Indus Valley civilisation to Mesopotamia due to trade.

== Phonology ==
=== Vowels ===
	Front		Central		Back	
	short	long	short	long	short	long
Close	*i	*ī			*u	*ū
Mid	*e	*ē			*o	*ō
Open			*a	*ā		

- The sequences *ai and *au are treated as *ay and *av (or *aw).

=== Consonants ===
Proto-Dravidian has been reconstructed as having the following consonant phonemes:

	Labial	Dental	Alveolar	Retroflex	Palatal	Velar	Glottal
Plosive	*p	*t	*ṯ	*ʈ	*c	*k	
Nasal	*m	*n	(*ṉ)	*ɳ	*ɲ	(*ŋ)	
Lateral			*l	*ɭ			
Rhotic			*r	*ɻ			
Semivowel	*w				*j		*H

- *ṉ is reconstructed by P. S. Subrahmanyam.
- *ɻ may also be represented as ḻ or r̤.

Feature matrix
	p	t	ṯ	ʈ	c	k	m	n	ṉ	ɳ	ɲ	ŋ	l	ɭ	r	ɻ	w	j	H
syllabic	-	-	-	-	-	-	-	-	-	-	-	-	-	-	-	-	-	-	-
consonantal	+	+	+	+	+	+	+	+	+	+	+	+	+	+	+	+	-	-	-
sonorant	-	-	-	-	-	-	+	+	+	+	+	+	+	+	+	+	+	+	-
continuant	-	-	-	-	-	-	-	-	-	-	-	-	+	+	+	+	+	+	+
anterior	+	+	+	-	-	-	+	+	+	-	-	-	+	-	+	-	+	-	-
coronal	-	+	+	+	+	-	-	+	+	+	+	-	+	+	+	+			
apical		-	+	+	-			-	+	+	-		+	+	+	+			
nasal							+	+	+	+	+	+	-	-	-	-			
lateral													+	+	-	-			

The singular alveolar plosive *ṯ developed into an alveolar trill /r/ in many of the South and South Central languages, it later merged with the tap in many of them; Tulu has /d͡ʒ, d̪, ɾ/ as reflexes, Manda-Kui made it /d͡ʒ/ and Hill-Maria Gondi made it /ʁ/. *ṯṯ and *nṯ became /r̥, nr/ in Konda and [tr, ndr] in many Tamil dialects. Apart from them, other languages did not rhotacize it, instead either preserving them or merging it with other sets of stops like dentals in Kannada, retroflexes in Telugu or palatals in Manda-Kui and some languages of Kerala. Central made all alveolars dental which is one of the features distinguishing it from South Central branch and North made it /r, s/. For example, Tamil āṟu, Tulu āji, Naiki sādi, Kui hāja; Tamil puṟṟu, Tulu puñca, Kannada huttu, Naiki puṭṭa, Konda puRi, Malto pute; Tamil onṟu, Tulu oñji, Pengo ronje, Brahui asi.

Velar nasal *ṅ occurred only before *k in Proto-Dravidian (as in many of its daughter languages). Therefore, it is not considered a separate phoneme in Proto-Dravidian. However, it attained phonemic status in languages like Malayalam, Gondi, Konda and Pengo because the original sequence *ṅk was simplified to *ṅ or *ṅṅ.

The glottal fricative *H has been proposed by Krishnamurti (2003) to account for the Old Tamil Aytam (Āytam) and other Dravidian comparative phonological phenomena.

P. S. Subrahmanyam reconstructs 6 nasals for PD compared to 4 by Krishnamurti, who also does not reconstruct a laryngeal.

The Northern Dravidian languages Kurukh, Malto and Brahui cannot easily be derived from the traditional Proto-Dravidian phonological system. Bhadriraju and others traditionally proposes *c, *k retracting to *k, *q before vowels other than *i(:), and Brahui and Kurukh spirantized the *q, e.g. Tamil kaṇ, Malto qanu; Kananda kem-, Brahui xisun; but there are exceptions, Tamil cōr, Malto curg̣e; Koraga jōku, Brahui cōshing. McAlpin (2003) proposes that they branched off from an earlier stage of Proto-Dravidian than the conventional reconstruction, which would apply only to the other languages. He suggests reconstructing a richer system of dorsal stop consonants:

Early Proto-Dravidian	Late Proto-Dravidian (Proto-Non-North Dravidian)	Proto-Kurukh-Malto	Brahui
*c	*c	*c	
*kʲ	*c	*k	k
*k	*k	*k	k
*q	*k	*q	x k / _i(ː)

== Vocabulary ==
=== Crop plants ===
Below are some crop plants that have been found in the Southern Neolithic complex of Karnataka and Andhra Pradesh, along with their Proto-Dravidian or Proto-South Dravidian reconstructions by Southworth (2005). In some cases, the proto-form glosses differ from the species identified from archaeological sites. For example, the two Southern Neolithic staple grasses Brachiaria ramosa and Setaria verticillata respectively correspond to the reconstructed Proto-Dravidian forms for Sorghum vulgare and Setaria italica as early Dravidian speakers shifted to millet species that were later introduced to South India.

Pulses
Common name	Scientific name	Reconstruction level	Proto-form	Gloss of proto-form
horsegram	Macrotyloma uniflorum	Late Proto-Dravidian	*koḷ	horsegram
green gram	Vigna radiata	Late Proto-Dravidian	*pacVṯ-/*pacVl	green gram
black gram	Vigna cf. mungo; Vigna trilobata	Late Proto-Dravidian	*uẓ-untu, *min(t)	black gram
hyacinth bean	Lablab purpureus	Proto-Tamil	*ava-rai	Dolichos lablab
pigeonpea	Cajanus cajan	Late Proto-Dravidian	*tu-var	pigeonpea

Millets and related grasses
Common name	Scientific name	Reconstruction level	Proto-form	Gloss of proto-form
browntop millet	Brachiaria ramosa	Late Proto-Dravidian	*conna-l	sorghum
bristly foxtail	Setaria verticillata	Late Proto-Dravidian	*kot-V	Setaria italica
sawa millet	Echinochloa cf. colona			
yellow foxtail	Setaria pumila			
little millet	Panicum sumatrense			
kodo millet	Paspalum scrobiculatum	Proto-South Dravidian	*(v)ār/ar-Vk	pearl millet
millet	Pennisetum glaucum	Proto-South Dravidian	*kam-pu	bulrush millet
finger millet	Eleusine coracana	Proto-South Dravidian	*ira(k)	ragi

Large cereals
Common name	Scientific name	Reconstruction level	Proto-form	Gloss of proto-form
barley	Hordeum vulgare			
wheat	Triticum	Late Proto-Dravidian?	*kūli	wheat
rice	Oryza sp.	Late Proto-Dravidian?	*war-iñci	rice

Other food/crop plants
Common name	Scientific name	Reconstruction level	Proto-form	Gloss of proto-form
jujube	Zizyphus sp.	Late Proto-Dravidian	*irak-	jujube
fig	Ficus sp.	Late Proto-Dravidian	*cuv-	fig
java plum	cf. Syzygium cumini	Late Proto-Dravidian	*ñēr-al	jambu
globe cucumber	Cucumis cf. prophetarum			
luffa	cf. Luffa cylindrica	Late Proto-Dravidian	*pīr	
flax	Linum usitatissimum	Proto-South Dravidian	*ak-V-ce	
cotton	Gossypium sp.	Proto-South Dravidian	*par-utti	
okra	Abelmoschus sp.			
parenchyma fragments		Early Proto-Dravidian	*kic-ampu	
date palm	Phoenix sp.	Early Proto-Dravidian	*cīntu	

Not identified archaeologically in the Southern Neolithic
Common name	Scientific name	Reconstruction level	Proto-form	Gloss of proto-form
onion/garlic	Allium sp.	Early Proto-Dravidian	*uḷḷi	
eggplant	Solanum sp.	Early Proto-Dravidian	*waẓ-VtV	
sesame	Sesamum indicum	Late Proto-Dravidian	*nū(v)	sesame
sugarcane	Saccharum sp.	Early Proto-Dravidian	*cet-Vkk	
hemp	Cannabis sp.	Late Proto-Dravidian ?	*boy-Vl	
tamarind	Tamarindus indica	Early Proto-Dravidian	*cintta	
holy basil	Ocimum tenuiflorum	Proto-Peninsular	*tuḷacV	

=== Basic vocabulary ===
Basic vocabulary of Proto-Dravidian selected from Krishnamurti (2003):

gloss	Proto-Dravidian
one	*on-ṯu
one (adj.)	*ōr-/*or-V-
two	*īr/*ir-V
three (adj.)	*muH-/*mū-
four (adj.)	*nāl/*nal-V-
five (adj.)	*cay-m-
six (adj.)	*caṯ-V
seven (adj.)	*eẓ-V
eight (adj.)	*eṇ
nine, 9/10	*toḷ-/*toṇ-
ten minus one	*on-patV
ten (adj.)	*paH-
head, hair, top	*tal-ay
cheek	*kap-Vḷ
eye	*kaṇ
eyeball	*kuṭ-V/*kuṇṭ-V
ear	*kew-i
nose, beak	*mū-nk(k)u/-nc-
tooth	*pal
mouth (Note: Also 'edge, beak, mouth of vessel, aperture, blade of sword'.)	*wāy
hand, arm	*kay
leg, foot	*kāl
heart, kidney	*kuṇṭV
liver	*taẓ-Vnk-/-nkk
milk, breast	*pāl
bone	*el-V-mp/-nk
bone marrow	*mūḷ-V-
excrement	*piy/*pī
house	*il
husband	*maẓc-a-
man, husband	*māy-tt-/*mā-cc-
woman	*peṇ
name	*pin-cc-Vr
sky	*wān-am
sun	*en-ṯ-
sun	*pōẓ/*poẓ-u-tu
moon, moonlight	*nel-a-nc/-ncc
month	*nel-V-
star	*cukk-V
star	*miHn
cloud	*muy-il
water	*nīr
river, stream	*yĀṯu
lake	*kuḷ-
sea, ocean	*kaṭ-al
stone	*kal
wind	*waḷi
day	*nāḷ
night	*nāḷ/*naḷ-V-
year	*yĀṇṭ-u
tree	*mar-an
fruit, pod	*kāy
forest	*kā(-n), kā-ṭu
grass	*pul
thatched grass	*pīr
dog	*naH-ay/-att/-kuẓi
animal, beast, deer	*mā
deer	*kur-V-c-
tiger	*pul-i
rat	*el-i
snake	*pāmpu
meat	*eṯ-ay-cci
meat	*ū/*uy
oil, ghee	*ney
fish	*mīn
louse	*pēn
mosquito	*nuẓ-Vḷ/-nk-
wing	*ceṯ-ank-/-ankk-
black	*cir-
white	*weḷ/*weṇ
red	*kem
sweet (adj./n.)	*in-
sour	*puḷ
bitter; bitterness	*kac-
to eat, drink	*uHṇ-
to eat	*tiHn-
to come	*waH-/*waH-r
to walk	*naṭ-a
to give	*ciy-/*cī-
to die	*caH- ~ *ceH-
to sleep	*kū-r-
to sleep	*tuñc-
to count	*eṇ

== See also ==
- Elamo-Dravidian languages
- Dravidian languages
- Sanskrit

== Bibliography ==
- Andronov, Mikhail Sergeevich (2003). A Comparative Grammar of the Dravidian Languages. Otto Harrassowitz Verlag. ISBN 978-3-447-04455-4.
- Ansumali Mukhopadhyay, Bahata (December 2021). "Ancestral Dravidian languages in Indus Civilization: ultraconserved Dravidian tooth-word reveals deep linguistic ancestry and supports genetics". Humanities and Social Sciences Communications. 8 (1) 193. doi:10.1057/s41599-021-00868-w. S2CID 236901972.
- Baldi, Philip (1990). Linguistic Change and Reconstruction Methodology. Walter de Gruyter. p. 342. ISBN 3-11-011908-0.
- Fuller, Dorian Q. (2007). "Non-human genetics, agricultural origins and historical linguistics in South Asia". The Evolution and History of Human Populations in South Asia. Vertebrate Paleobiology and Paleoanthropology Series. pp. 393–443. doi:10.1007/1-4020-5562-5_18. ISBN 978-1-4020-5561-4.
- Krishnamurti, Bhadriraju (2003). The Dravidian Languages. Cambridge University Press. ISBN 978-1-139-43533-8.
- McAlpin, David W. (2003). "Velars, Uvulars and the Northern Dravidian hypothesis". Journal of the American Oriental Society. 123 (3): 521–546. doi:10.2307/3217749. JSTOR 3217749.
- McIntosh, Jane (2008). The Ancient Indus Valley: New Perspectives. ABC-CLIO. ISBN 978-1-57607-907-2.
- Parpola, Asko; Parpola, Simo (1975). "On the relationship of the Sumerian toponym Meluhha and Sanskrit mleccha". Studia Orientalia. 46: 205–238.
- Southworth, Franklin C. (2005). Proto-Dravidian Agriculture (PDF). 7th ESCA Round Table Conference, Kyoto, June 2005.
- Subrahmanyam, P.S. (1983). Dravidian Comparative Phonology. Annamalai University.
- Zvelebil, Kamil (1990). Dravidian Linguistics: An Introduction. Pondicherry Institute of Linguistics and Culture.
