= Konda language (Dravidian) =

Language of India

Konda
- Koṇḍa, Konda-Dhora, Kubi
- కొండ (in Telugu script) କୋଣ୍ଡା (in Odia script)
- Pronunciation: IPA: [koɳɖa]
- Native to: India
- Region: ASR DISTRICT, (Andhra Pradesh), Koraput (Odisha)
- Ethnicity: Konda-Dhora, a scheduled tribe within India
- Native speakers: 61,000 (2011 census)
- Language family: Dravidian: Southern; South-Central; Konda-Kui; Konda
- Writing system: Telugu (Main) Odia (secondary, in Odisha) Konda-Dhora (secondary, used by some)

Language codes
- ISO 639-3: kfc
- Glottolog: kond1295
- ELP: Konda-Dora

Konda-Dhora, also known simply as Konda or Kubi (IPA: [koɳɖa, kuːbi]), is a Dravidian language spoken in India. It is spoken by the Konda-Dora scheduled tribe, who mostly live in the Parvathipiram Manyam district of Andhra Pradesh, and the Koraput district of Odisha.

Konda-Dhora is written in the Telugu script in Andhra Pradesh, and in the Odia script in Odisha. Indian linguist Sathupati Prasanna Sree designed a unique script for the language, although it is unclear how widespread this system is. Most Konda-Dora people are fluent in Telugu in Andhra Pradesh, and Odia in Odisha, because of economic pressures to integrate into the larger economies and dominant cultures.

== Classification ==
Konda is classified as a Dravidian language, in the same family as Tamil, Kannada, Malayalam, and Telugu. Konda is classified as a member of the South-Central branch of the Dravidian language family, in the same grouping as its much larger neighbor Telugu, as well as neighboring minority languages, namely Gondi, Kui, Kuvi, Pengo, and Manda. All South-Central Dravidian languages are believed to have diverged from the Southern branch of Proto-Dravidian several centuries BCE. South-Central Dravidian and South Dravidian share innovations that distinguish them from the other branches of Dravidian, however at some point, the differences between South and South-Central Dravidian languages became enough to classify the branches separately. Konda is considered to be among the most conservative of the South-Central Dravidian languages because it maintains a distinction between a tapped /ɾ/ versus a stop /ṟ/ that existed in the Proto-South-Central Dravidian language.

== Phonology ==
=== Vowels ===
Vowels
	Front		Central		Back	
	short	long	short	long	short	long
High	i	iː			u	uː
Mid	e	eː			o	oː
Low			a	aː		

In Konda, there exist five vowel sounds, each with a long and short form, therefore having ten total vowel sounds, which is the standard for most Dravidian languages. Konda only distinguishes between long and short vowels when the sound is in the word-initial position. There exist no diphthongs in Konda, but there are instances where two vowels will be in sequence of one another; in this case, the vowels are pronounced separately and this marks the separation between words.

=== Consonants ===
Consonants
		Labial	Dental/ Alveolar	Retroflex	Dorsal	Glottal
Nasal		m	n	ɳ	ŋ	
Stop	voiceless	p	t̪	ʈ	k	ʔ
Stop	voiced	b	d̪	ɖ	ɡ	
Fricative	voiceless		s			(h)
Fricative	voiced		z			
Tap			ɾ	ɽ		
Trill	voiceless		r̥			
Trill	voiced		r			
Approximant		w	l	ɭ	j	

Consonants in Konda are roughly in line with those of other Dravidian languages like Telugu, albeit with some small differences.

- In Konda, unlike in Telugu, there exists a phonemic glottal stop, /ʔ/.
- The glottal stop present in Konda is rare in south Asia, and alongside /r̥/, /ɳ/, and /ŋ/, cannot occur in the initial position. All consonants can occur intervocalically, meaning between vowels, and in clusters.
- Stop consonants present in Konda, when they follow a short vowel, are equivalent to double consonants in Telugu (e.g. p = pp, b = bb, etc.).

In Konda, consonants fall into two main categories: obstruents and sonorants. Obstruents are characterized by voiced-voiceless distinctions, and include all stops (except /ʔ/), fricatives, and trills. Sonorants, in contrast to obstruents, are all voiced, except for /ʔ/ (which is always voiceless), and include nasals, liquids, semi-consonants, and flaps.

==== Consonant Clusters ====
Consonant clusters in Konda, consisting of either two or three consonants, follow a general rule of occurring between vowels, and rarely fall in the initial position. For consonant clusters consisting of two consonants, there are four classes: Obstruent+Obstruent, Sonorant+Sonorant, Obstruent+Sonorant, and Sonorant+Obstruent. Within consonant clusters, /ʔ/ cannot occur in the first position, and /r̥/ cannot occur in the second position. Within the class containing two obstruents, which is the most infrequent, there is a general tendency to have two voiced obstruents paired with each other, rather than a voiced-voiceless pair. Also within dual consonant clusters, when obstruents are final, a voiceless obstruent is more common than its voiced counterparts.

Konda also exhibits triple consonant clusters, almost all of which follow the pattern of sonorant+obstruent+sonorant (SOS).

== Grammar ==
=== Nouns ===
==== Gender ====
There exist two grammatical genders: masculine and neuter. Most nouns do not exhibit clear markers of gender, rather, the gender of a noun can be determined from its meaning. Male persons, both singular and plural, belong to the masculine gender; female persons and non-person objects (i.e birds, plants, animals, objects, etc.) belong to the neuter gender.

==== Number ====
In Konda, there are two grammatical numbers: singular, denoting one, and plural, denoting more than one. The singular, in all cases, goes unmarked. The plural, however, has two groups of suffixes; one suffix only used for masculine nouns, and another suffix mainly used for non-masculine nouns.

==== Case ====
Konda, as in other Dravidian languages, exhibits a number of cases, each with separate endings used to denote certain situations. These cases are:

- Nominative
- Accusative-Dative
- Instrumental-Ablative
- Genitive
- Locative

===== Nominative =====
All noun stems in the singular and plural, which occur without any suffixes, are said to be in the nominative case. Nouns in the nominative case, if they are marked for number and gender as well, are the subjects of the sentences they are in. Nouns that are not quantifiable are ineligible for becoming the subject of the sentence. For example, the noun "anasi", meaning elder brother, is the nominative singular form, whereas in the plural, the only modification to the original nominative singular form is to add an "-r" suffix to indicate this plural.

===== Accusative-Dative =====
In Konda, as happens in the Pengo and Manda languages, the accusative and dative cases in each language are marked by the same ending(s), romanized for Konda as -ŋ/-ŋi. In Konda, these endings are obligated to follow human nouns. In the case of Konda, the common ending for the accusative and dative cases is thought to have originated via a combination of the two endings; the accusative -n combined with the dative -k, and these sounds merged to form the dorsal nasal /ŋ/, rather than a consonant cluster /-nk/.

===== Instrumental-Ablative =====
In Konda, the instrumental-ablative case is formed by the addition of the suffixes (-aṇḍ or ŋ). These endings (-aṇḍ or ŋ) are used when the noun ends in -ti, -di, or -r̥i, in the singular, and the instrumental-ablative causes singular oblique stems ending in -i to lose this before the vowel-marker for the instrumental-ablative case. The instrumental-ablative case is used as a replacement for the English prepositions "with","by", or "by means of". When used in phrases denoting time and place, the instrumental-ablative case takes the meaning of "from/ since". In the plural, use of the instrumental-ablative case is quite rare.

===== Genitive =====
Konda exhibits the genitive case with its stem system, with there being two uses for the genitive case. There exists the oblique stem, which is added onto the noun when it is in its genitive form to indicate possession. In Konda, the oblique stem is identical to a noun in its genitive form, with the genitive indicated by the addition of a suffix -di to singular neuter stems, and -a added to plural neuter stems. For masculine stems, all masculine nouns lack markers in the oblique, in the singular. In the plural, masculine nouns ending in -r, add the suffix, -i, to mark the oblique.

===== Locative =====
The locative case suffixes (-d, -du, -t, -tu, -r̥, -r̥u, -do, -to, -ṟo, -ṭo, -i) are attached to the nominative ending, when singular, whereas in the plural, the locative and accusative-dative are identical. In Konda, the locative case is used to indicate "in, on, into, onto".

=== Example ===
The following example is taken from Bh. Krishnamurti's 1969 book Koṇḍa or Kūbi: A Dravidian Language (Note*- This example does not include the instrumental-ablative case)

English	Nominative	Oblique stem	Acc.-Dat.	Locative
bank	gaṭu	gaṭu-di-	gaṭu-di-ŋ	gaṭ-tu
night	ṟeyu	ṟeyu-di-	ṟeyu-di-ŋ	ṟey-tu
house	ilu	ilu-di-	ilu-di-ŋ	in-ṟo
cave	sālam	sālam-ti-	sālam-ti-ŋ	sālam-i

==== Description of the table ====
- One may notice that in the locative case, there are several different endings, which are used depending on the final letter in the word and replace that final letter with the case ending. In regards to the locative example of the word "house", the Konda word "in-ṟo", meaning "into the house", is unique in comparison to the other forms of the word because it is an exemption to the general rules of Konda.
- The oblique stems cannot stand on their own. Rather, the oblique stem is used to further inflect the noun to add more meaning to the noun.
- The suffix -ti- that exists on the word "sālam-", meaning "cave", is different, but this is in line with grammatical rules in Konda.

=== Verbs ===
In Konda, verbs are only inflected for tense and/or mood. Verb stems form the nucleus of a verb, have several forms: simple, complex, or compound.

==== Simple verb stems ====
Simple verb stems can take one of many forms, although the most common verb stems are:

- (C)VC
- (C)VCC
- (C)V̄C
- (C)V̄CC

In these forms, consonants (C) are the most common way to end a verb stem, although forms exist with vowels in the final position. It should also be noted that there are two forms for each of the most common forms; one uses a short vowel (V), and the other uses a long vowel (V̄). Consonants are optional in the initial position. All of these verb forms are generally monosyllabic and as previously noted, typically end in consonants.

==== Complex verb stems ====
Complex stems are normally constructed from two main parts: a simple verb stem with a derivative suffix. The derivative suffixes are either transitive/causative or reflexive stems that are added to the simple stem to form a complex stem.

==== Compound verb stems ====
Compound stems are formed by the merger of two different verb stems into one compound stem. There are iterative and non-iterative compound stems, each of which has subdivisions within them to indicate further meaning.
