= Kolam people =

Kolam
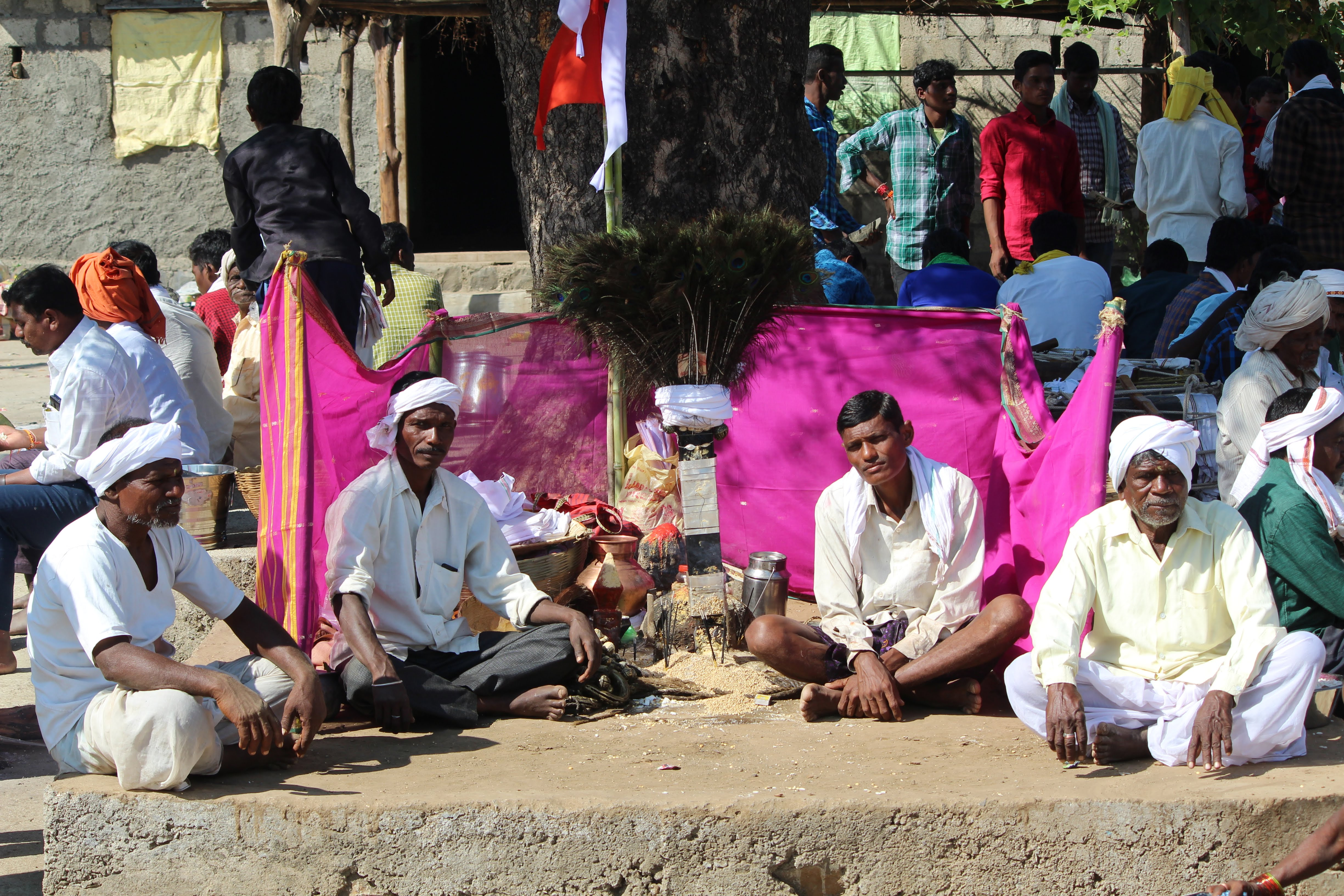
- Kolams worshipping Lord Bhimayyak, their tribal deity

Total population
- 239,583 (2011 census)

Regions with significant populations
- India
- Maharastra: 194,671
- Telangana: 44,912

Languages
- Kolami • Marathi • Telugu

The Kolam are a Dravidian ethnic group and Scheduled Tribe in the Indian states of Telangana, Chhattisgarh, Madhya Pradesh and Maharashtra. They belong to the sub-category Particularly vulnerable tribal group, one of the three belonging to this sub-category, the others being Katkari and Madia Gond.

They are common in the Yavatmal, Chandrapur and Nanded districts of Maharashtra and live in hamlets called pod. They speak the Kolami language, which is a Dravidian language. They are an agricultural community.

They have a high rate of returning positive to the Naked eye single tube red cell osmotic fragility test (NESTROFT) test, making them prone to high incidence of Thalassaemia.

== Society ==
The Kolam are an endogamous group and are divided into twelve exogamous clans, called pedi: Tekam, Kodapa, Athram, Godhankar, Wathora, Shivle, Parsinekul, Ghotkar, Paraskar, Ravikul, Mautkar, Shootkar. One clan name (Tekam) is shared with the Gonds, while the others come from Marathi.

Kolam society was formerly made up of joint families, collectively responsible for farming. Today, however, most Kolams have nuclear families, called attena bala sula. Do-masnet-mah-up, respect, is to be given to the bhasa (husband's elder brother), mama (husband's father), appa (husband's mother), dhobak (grandfather of husband), and dhoi (grandmother of husband). Similar respect is given to the corresponding relations on the wife's side of the family. Respect is also given from sanjine (son-in-law) and aap (wife's mother). Other types of relations exist between brothers and sisters-in-law and grandchildren and grandparents, each with their own name.

In rural Maharashtra, Kolam pods still have their own panchayats who arbitrate disputes. Office-bearers are the Naik (the leader), Mahajan (Naik's second-in-command), Karbhari (treasurer), Ghatya (peon) and Tarma (cook/messenger). These posts are reserved for men only. The Naik and other officers are responsible for the smooth conducting of business but the decision is actually reached by the elders. The Naik is selected by the men of the village by consensus choice. Although nowadays, the influence of government courts is increasing nearly all the time disputes between Kolam tribespeople are settled in panchayat and usually it is only when the other party is a non-Kolam that the case is taken to the government court.

== Marriage ==
Kolams practice monogamous marriage, penli. Cross-cousin marriage is permitted. Marriageable age is 18–20 years. Marriage of a widow to their brother is forbidden, but marriage of a man to his wife's sister is permitted after the death of his first wife. Married women wear Mangalsutra, mattel (earring), ongarar (finger-ring), besar (nose stud), torde (bichia) and hirwat gajal (bangles). They have no dowry. Most marriages are arranged, but marriage by capture is sometimes allowed. However, most instances of marriage by capture are prearranged by the two parties.
