= Kumbara =

Hindu artisan community traditionally associated with pottery

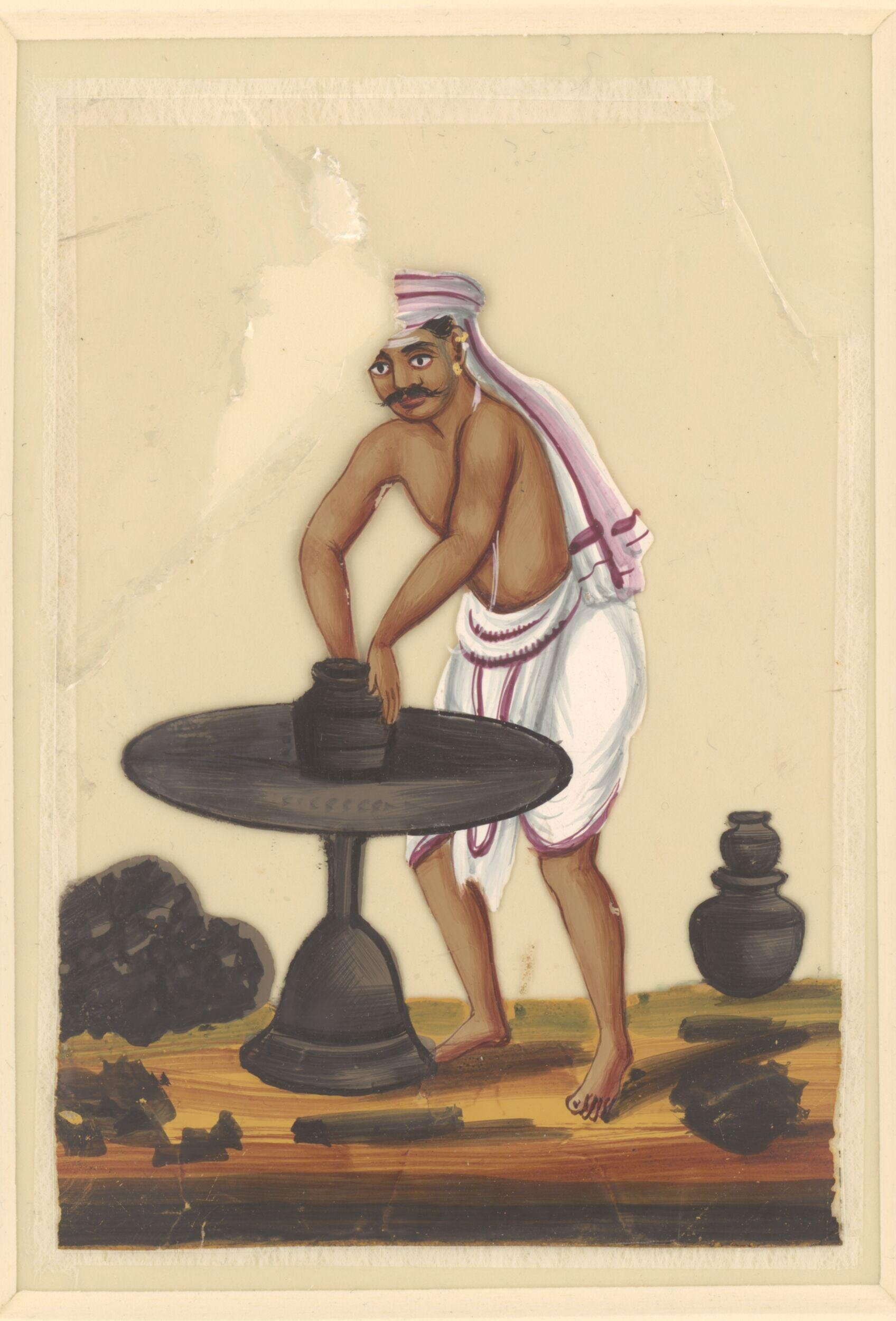
Painting; gouache on mica, A potter with his wheel, Trichinopoly, ca.1860

The Kumbāra community, also known as Kumbhar, Kumbar, Kumhar is a traditional artisan community historically associated with pottery and ceramic craftsmanship across large parts of the Indian subcontinent. The name derives from the Sanskrit term Kumbhakāra, meaning "maker of pots," is closely related to the classical word Kulala, which also denotes a potter in ancient Sanskrit literature. Members of this community have long been engaged in shaping clay into utilitarian vessels, ritual objects, and domestic ceramics that played an essential role in everyday life and religious practices. Pottery is one of the oldest crafts in South Asia, with archaeological evidence of advanced ceramic traditions dating back to the Indus Valley Civilisation, where kiln-fired pottery and painted ceramics were widely produced. Within the traditional village economy of India, potters formed an important part of the artisan network responsible for manufacturing household utensils, storage containers, and ritual vessels used in hindu ceremonies. In many regions, the community became known by regional variations of the name derived from Kumbhakāra, including Kumbar in Karnataka, Kumhar in North India, and related forms in other linguistic traditions.

Beyond their occupational identity, individuals from the community have also played notable roles in devotional and cultural movements. One of the most widely revered figures is the 13th-century saint Gora Kumbhar, a prominent devotee associated with the Varkari movement whose spiritual poetry and teachings remain influential in the bhakti traditions of western India.

== Films ==
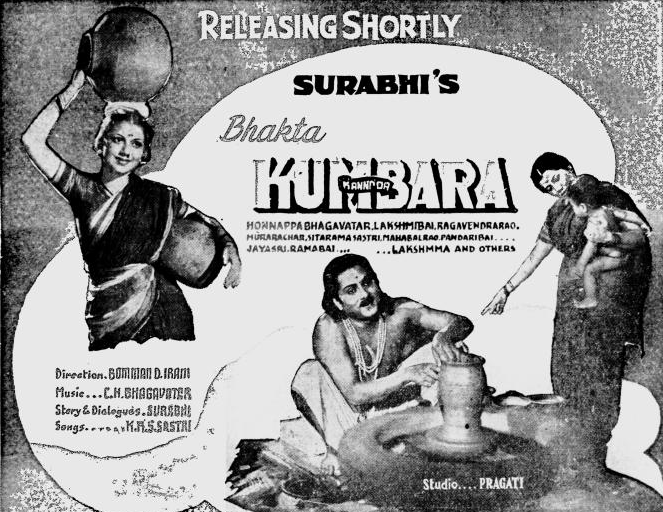
This is a poster of the 1948 Kannada-language film Bhakta Kumbara that appeared on a 1948 edition of The Indian Express.

- Bhakta Kumbara – Kannada devotional film based on the life of saint Gora Kumbhar.

== See also ==
- Kulala
- Kumhar
- Vatalia Prajapati
- Gora Kumbhar
