= Kumbaran language =

Southern Dravidian language of India

Kumbaran
- Native to: India
- Native speakers: 10,000 (2004)
- Language family: Dravidian: Southern; Southern I; (unclassified); Kumbaran

Language codes
- ISO 639-3: wkb
- Glottolog: kumb1267

Kumbaran (IPA: [kumbɐɾɐn]) is an unclassified Southern Dravidian language spoken by a Scheduled Caste of India.

== See also ==
- Kumbara
