= Murray Barnson Emeneau =

Canadian-American linguist (1904–2005)

- Born: February 28, 1904; Lunenburg, Nova Scotia, Canada
- Died: August 29, 2005 (aged 101); Berkeley, California, U.S.
- Citizenship: American
- Known for: Dravidian linguistics, linguistic areas

Academic background
- Education: Dalhousie University (B.A.); Yale University (Ph.D.)
- Doctoral advisor: Franklin Edgerton

Academic work
- Institutions: Yale University; University of California, Berkeley
- Doctoral students: William Bright, Ram Karan Sharma, Bh. Krishnamurti
- Main interests: Linguistics, Dravidian studies, Sanskrit studies, Indology

Murray Barnson Emeneau (February 28, 1904 – August 29, 2005) was a Canadian-American linguist and the founder of the Department of Linguistics at the University of California, Berkeley.

== Early life and education ==
Emeneau was born in Lunenburg, a fishing town on the east coast of Nova Scotia, Canada. Having distinguished himself in classical languages in high school, he obtained a four-year scholarship to Dalhousie University in Halifax to further his classical studies. On obtaining his B.A. degree from Dalhousie, Emeneau was awarded a Rhodes Scholarship to Balliol College at Oxford University. From Oxford he arrived at Yale University in 1926, where he took a teaching appointment in Latin. While at Yale, Emeneau began Sanskrit and Indo-European studies with the Sanskritist Franklin Edgerton and Indo-Europeanist Edgar Sturtevant. In 1931 Emeneau was awarded his Ph.D. with a dissertation on the Vetālapañcaviṃśatī.

Given the dire employment situation in the early 1930s, Emeneau stayed on at Yale after completing his dissertation, taking courses in the "new linguistics" being taught by Edward Sapir. Emeneau wrote:

I was exposed to methods of fieldwork on non-literary languages, including intensive phonetic practice and analysis of material, but especially to Sapir's approach to anthropological linguistics, in which language is only part of the total culture, but a most important part, since in it the community expresses in its own way, 'verbifies' its culture.

— 1980, 352

It was Sapir who suggested that Emeneau take up a study of the Toda language of the Nilgiri hills in South India with an aim toward a comparative study of the Dravidian languages. Emeneau may have been the last student of Sapir.

== Dravidian and Indian linguistics ==
Emeneau contributed study of the lesser known, non-literary languages of the Dravidian family. His work on the Toda language remains essential reading for students of Dravidian. His phonetic descriptions of the language, based on impressionistic data collection without the aid of recording devices, was corroborated some 60 years later by the eminent phoneticians Peter Ladefoged and Peri Bhaskararao using modern phonetic methods.

His linguistic descriptions of Dravidian languages were often accompanied by sociolinguistic, folkloric, and ethnographic description. Emeneau is also credited with the study of areal phenomena in linguistics, with his seminal article, India as a Linguistic Area. Emeneau's contribution to Dravidian linguistics includes detailed descriptions of Toda, Badaga, Kolami, and Kota.

Perhaps Emeneau's greatest achievement in Dravidian studies is the Dravidian Etymological Dictionary (in two volumes), written with Thomas Burrow and first published in 1961. Despite the characteristic reserve that eschewed historical reconstruction, this work, revised in a 1984 second edition, remains the indispensable guide, tool, and authority for every Dravidianist.

== Professional achievements ==
In addition to the Department of Linguistics, Emeneau also founded the Survey of California Indian Languages (later renamed the Survey of California and Other Indian Languages), which has catalogued and documented indigenous languages of the Americas for several decades.

Emeneau served as president of the Linguistic Society of America (LSA) in 1949 as well as serving as editor of the Society's journal, Language. In 1952 he served as president of the American Oriental Society.

Emeneau was named the Collitz Professor of the Linguistic Society of America in 1953, and at Berkeley he gave the Faculty Research Lecture in 1957. The recipient of four honorary degrees — from the University of Chicago (1968), Dalhousie University (1970), the University of Hyderabad (1987), and Kameshwar Singh Darbhanga Sanskrit University (1999) — as well as the Wilbur Lucius Cross Medal from Yale and the Medal of Merit of the American Oriental Society. Emeneau was also a Fellow of the American Academy of Arts and Sciences, a Member of the American Philosophical Society, a Fellow of the British Academy, an Honorary Fellow of the Royal Asiatic Society, an Honorary Member of the Linguistic Society of India and of the Vietnam Academy of Social Sciences, and the sole Honorary Member of the Philological Society (the oldest professional linguistic society in the world).

He was also a visiting professor at Aligarh Muslim University. Well into his 90s, Emeneau was known to visit the Departments of Linguistics and South and Southeast Asian Studies at Berkeley, to encourage new generations of students of South Asian linguistics.

== Bibliography ==
- Jambhaladatta's Version of the Vetālapañcavinśati: A Critical Sanskrit Text in Transliteration (1934)
- A Course in Annamese: Lessons in the Pronunciation and Grammar of the Annamese Language (1943)
- The Sinduvāra Tree in Sanskrit Literature (1944)
- Kota Texts (3 vols, 1944–46)
- An Annamese Reader (with Lý-duc-Lâm and Diether von den Steinen, 1944)
- Annamese-English Dictionary (with Diether von den Steinen, 1945)
- The Strangling Figs in Sanskrit Literature (1949)
- Studies in Vietnamese (Annamese) Grammar (1951)
- Kolami, a Dravidian Language (1955)
- A Dravidian Etymological Dictionary (with Thomas Burrow, 1961; 2nd ed. 1984)
- Brahui and Dravidian Comparative Grammar (1962)
- Abhijñāna-Śakuntala: Translated from the Bengali Recension (1962)
- Dravidian Borrowings from Indo-Aryan (with T. Burrow, 1962)
- India and Historical Grammar (1965)
- Sanskrit Sandhi and Exercises (1968)
- Dravidian Comparative Phonology: A Sketch (1970)
- Toda Songs (1971)
- Ritual Structure and Language Structure of the Todas (1974)
- Language and Linguistic Area: Essays (1980)
- Toda Grammar and Texts (1984)
- Dravidian Studies: Selected Papers (1994)
