= Bhadriraju Krishnamurti =

Indian linguist (1928–2012)

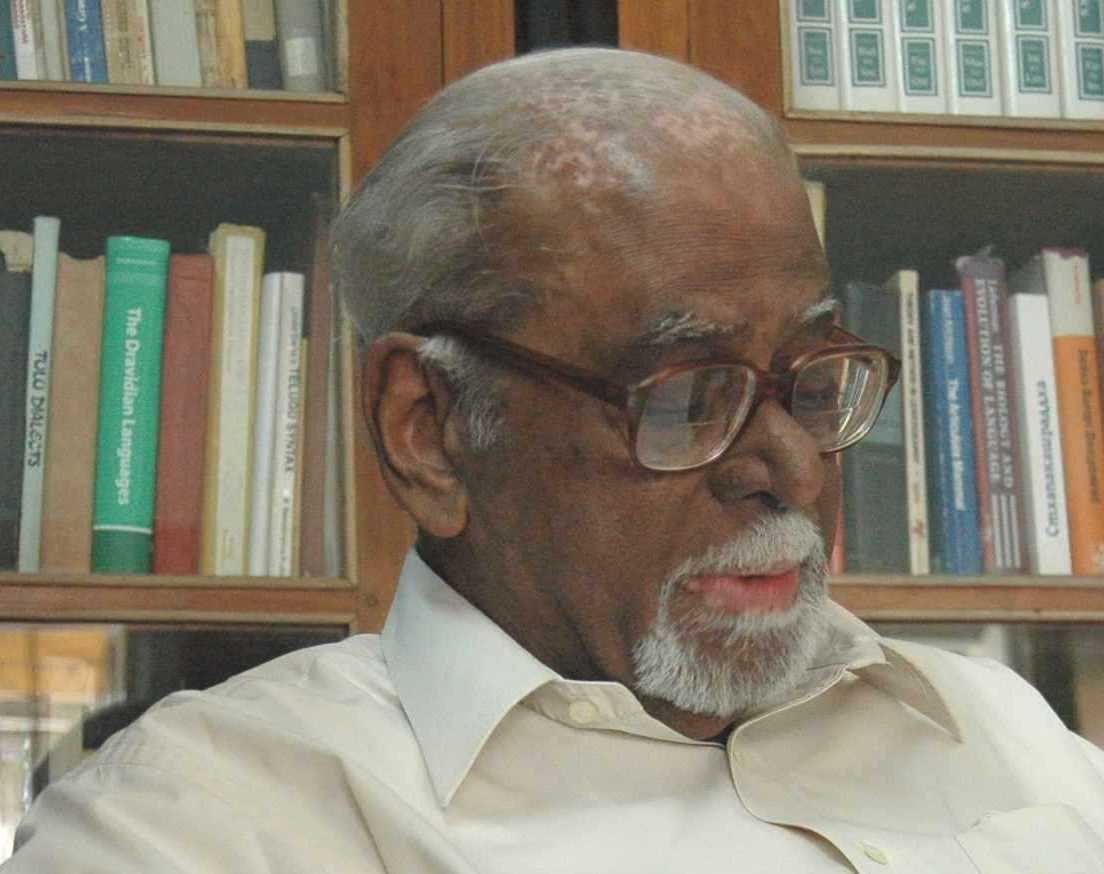
- Krishnamurti in 2010

Professor of Linguistics (Founder and Head of the department) Osmania University
- In office 1962 – 1988 (On leave of absence 1986–88)

Vice-Chancellor University of Hyderabad
- In office 1986–1993

Resident Fellow Center for Advanced Study in the Behavioral Sciences Stanford University
- In office 1975 – 1976, 2000 fall

Member Institute for Advanced Study in Princeton, New Jersey
- In office 1999–2000

Honorary Professor Andhra University
- Incumbent
- Assumed office 2003

Personal details
- Born: 19 June 1928 Ongole, Madras Presidency, British India (now Andhra Pradesh, India)
- Died: 11 August 2012 (aged 84) Hyderabad, Andhra Pradesh, (now in Telangana), India
- Spouse: Bh. Syamala
- Profession: Historical linguist Dravidian linguist Academician; Administrator

Bhadriraju Krishnamurti (19 June 1928 – 11 August 2012) was an Indian linguist who specialised in Dravidian languages. He was born in Ongole in the Madras Presidency of British India (now in Andhra Pradesh, India). He was the vice-chancellor of the University of Hyderabad from 1986 to 1993, and founded the Department of Linguistics at Osmania University, where he served as a professor from 1962 to 1986. His magnum opus, The Dravidian Languages, is considered a landmark volume in the study of Dravidian linguistics.

Krishnamurti was a student and close associate of Murray Barnson Emeneau. He got his A.M. and Ph.D. degrees from the University of Pennsylvania in 1955 and 1957, respectively. His grandson, Ravi Bhadriraju, was a rhythm guitarist in the famous death metal band, Job for a Cowboy.

== Contribution to linguistics ==
Krishnamurti is considered to be among the first to apply the rigour of modern comparative linguistic theory to further the study of Dravidian languages. His thesis Telugu Verbal Bases (1961) is the first comprehensive account of comparative Dravidian phonology and derivational morphology of verbal bases in Dravidian from the standpoint of Telugu. His comprehensive grammar on koṃḍa or Kūbi is a monumental work in the area of non-literary Dravidian languages. His research was devoted to the central problems of phonology and morphology/syntax of Dravidian, and he made significant contributions in advancing the then nascent field of comparative and historical Dravidian studies in the second half of the twentieth century. His Comparative Dravidian Linguistics: Current Perspectives is a collection of twenty-one important articles published during the period 1955–1998, which attempts to provide solutions to many outstanding problems of Dravidian linguistics. His recent work The Dravidian Languages published by Cambridge University Press (2003) is a culmination of the scholarly research carried out by him in the last fifty years. It replaces Caldwell's one-hundred-fifty-year-old A comparative Grammar of Dravidian or South Indian Family of Languages as a comprehensive and authoritative source of reference on the Dravidian languages.

After a brief service (1960–61) at the University of California, Berkeley, he returned to India and started the Department of Linguistics at Osmania University which later became the first center of Advanced Studies in Linguistics in India. He was also instrumental in conceptualizing, designing and implementing the compilation of A Telugu Dialect Dictionary of Occupational Vocabularies in Andhra Pradesh, India, and so far over a dozen volumes covering different occupations and dialects have been published. This series is first of its kind in India.

== Positions held ==
Krishnamurti worked as a lecturer in Telugu at Andhra University (1949–61); Assistant Professor at the University of California, Berkeley (1960–61); Reader in Telugu, S. V. U.(1961–62); Professor of Linguistics (1962–88), Osmania University, Dean, Faculty of Arts (1973–76), Member, Univ Syndicate (1971–75); Director, Southern Regional Centre, Indian Council of Social Science Research (1978–82); Vice-Chancellor, University of Hyderabad (1986–93), Honorary Professor, University of Hyderabad 1993–99; Andhra University 2003–.

Krishnamurti was also associated with the study of South Indian languages in many western institutions, and was a visiting professor of linguistics at several universities. He was the first Asian Fellow at ANU (1974), a Resident Fellow at the Center for Advanced Study in the Behavioral Sciences, Stanford (1975–76), and Rama Watumaull Distinguished Indian Scholar at the University of Hawaii (1995).

He was a visiting professor at University of Michigan, Ann Arbor (1967), Cornell University, Ithaca (1967, 1970), Australian National University (1974), Tokyo University (1982), University of Pennsylvania, Philadelphia (1983), University of Illinois, Urbana-Champaign (1986), University of Hawaii (1995), University of Texas at Arlington (1995). Resident Fellow, Center for Advanced Study in the Behavioral Sciences, Stanford (2000 –2001), Member, Institute for Advanced Study, Princeton (1999–2000), Visiting Fellow, Research Centre for Linguistic Typology, Institute for Advanced Study, La Trobe University, Melbourne (2001), Visiting Scientist, Max Planck Institute in Evolutionary Anthropology, Leipzig, Germany (2003 September–November); He was also served as President of the Linguistic Society of India in 1970, and also as President of the Dravidian Linguistics Association in 1980.

== Awards ==
He was the first of the two Indian scholars to become a fellow of the Royal Society of Edinburgh (2004), and only second Indian after S. K. Chatterji to receive an honorary membership from the Linguistic Society of America in 1985. He was elected Corresponding Fellow of the Royal Society of Edinburgh, UK, in 2004. He had been an executive member of Sahitya Akademi, New Delhi, 1990–2002. He was conferred an honorary doctorate in literature by Sri Venkateswara University in 1998, and by Dravidian University in 2007. He was elected Fellow of Sahitya Akademi, New Delhi, in 2004. He received the Gidugu Ramamurti Award at the 15th TANA (Telugu Association of North America), Detroit, July 2005. He was the first recipient of the Telugu Bhaarati Award instituted by C.P.Brown Academy, Hyderabad (2008). He also received the Lifetime Achievement Award at the 10th ATA (American Telugu Association), New Jersey, for significant contributions to Telugu and Dravidian linguistics, 3–5 July 2008. He was presented Indian Linguistics, Vol. 70, as Festschrift by the Linguistic Society of India, on the occasion of his 80th birth year in 2009.

He died after a brief illness in 2012.

== Publications in English ==
=== Authored ===
- Krishnamurti, Bhadriraju (1961). Telugu Verbal Bases: A Comparative and Descriptive Study (reprinted 1972). UCPL. Vol. 24. Berkeley and Los Angeles: University of California Press. ISBN 978-1-258-17843-7.
- Krishnamurti, Bhadriraju; P. Sivananda Sarma (1968). A Basic Course in Modern Telugu. Hyderabad: Department of Linguistics, Osmania University (reprinted in 2006 by Telugu Akademi, Himayatnagar, Hyderabad).
- Krishnamurti, Bhadriraju (1969). koṃḍa or Kūbi: A Dravidian Language. Tribal Cultural Research and Training Institute. Vol. 2. Hyderabad: Tribal Cultural Research and Training Institute, Govt. of Andhra Pradesh.
- Krishnamurti, Bhadriraju; Djordje Kostic'; Alokananda Mitter (1977). A Short Outline of Telugu Phonetics. Calcutta: Indian Statistical Institute.
- Krishnamurti, Bhadriraju; J P L Gwynn (1985). A Grammar of Modern Telugu. New Delhi: Oxford University Press. ISBN 978-0-19-561664-4.
- Krishnamurti, Bhadriraju; I. Ramabrahmam; C. R. Rao (1995). Evaluation of Total Literacy Campaigns: Chittoor and Nizamabad Districts of Andhra Pradesh. Hyderabad: Book Links Corporation. ISBN 978-81-85194-35-6.
- Krishnamurti, Bhadriraju (1998). Language, Education and Society. New Delhi: Sage. ISBN 978-81-7036-695-9.
- Krishnamurti, Bhadriraju (2001). Comparative Dravidian Linguistics: Current Perspectives. Oxford University Press, USA. ISBN 978-0-19-824122-5.
- Krishnamurti, Bhadriraju (2003). The Dravidian Languages. Cambridge Language Surveys (1 ed.). Cambridge: Cambridge University Press. ISBN 978-0-521-77111-5.
- Krishnamurti, Bhadriraju (2010). Studies in Telugu Linguistics. Hyderabad: C P Brown Academy. ISBN 978-93-8012-099-7.

=== Edited ===
- Emeneau, M.B. (1968). Krishnamurti, Bhadriraju (ed.). Studies in Indian Linguistics: Professor M. B. Emeneau Ṣaṣṭipūrti Volume. Poona and Annamalainagar: Centres of Advanced Study in Linguistics.
- Krishnamurti, Bhadriraju; Mukherji, Aditi, eds. (1984). Modernization of Indian Languages in News Media. Hyderabad: Department of Linguistics, Osmania University.
- Krishnamurti, Bhadriraju; Massica, C.P.; Sinha, A.K, eds. (1986). South Asian Languages: Structure, Convergence, and Diglossia (Proceedings of the Second International Conference of the South Asian Languages and Linguistics). Delhi: Motilal Banarsidass.
- Krishnamurti, Bhadriraju; Dimock, Edward C.; Kachru, Brah, eds. (1992). Dimensions of Sociolinguistics in South Asia: Papers in Memory of Gerald Kelley. Delhi: Oxford & IBH Publishing Co. P.Ltd.
- Krishnamurti, Bhadriraju (ed.). Gold Nuggets: An Anthology of Telugu Short Stories of the Post-Independence Period in Translation. Chaganti Vijayasree. New Delhi: Sahitya Akademi.

== Publications in Telugu ==
=== Authored ===
- Krishnamurti, Bhadriraju; Eswara Reddy (1980). janawācakam in 5 Volumes (One primer and workbook, two readers and a teacher's guide for Telugu non-literates). Hyderabad: Director of Adult Education, Government of Andhra Pradesh.
- Krishnamurti, Bhadriraju. Tēlika telugu wācakam (Literacy Primer in Telugu, Parts I & II). Hyderabad: Visalandhra Publishers.
- Krishnamurti, Bhadriraju (1998). cinnanāTi padyālu (Poems of Younger Days). Hyderabad: Author.
- bhāSa, samājam, saṃskṛti (Language, Society and Culture). Hyderabad: Nilkamal Publishers. 1999. ISBN 978-81-86804-46-9.

=== Edited ===
- Krishnamurthi, Bhadriraju, ed. (1962). (Ed. & Comp.) Mānṇḍalika Writtipadakōśam: A Telugu Dialect Dictionary of Occupational Vocabularies. Vol. I: Agriculture Vocabulary. Hyderabad: A.P.: A.P.Sahitya Akademi (Reprinted 1974). ISBN 978-1-179-07882-3.
- A. Ramakrishna Rao & D.V. Avadhani (1971). Krishnamurti, Bhadriraju (ed.). Tikkana padaprayōga kōśam (A Concordance of Tikkana's Māhābhārata, a literary work of the 13th century). Vol. I. Hyderabad: A.P. Sahitya Akademi.
- Krishnamurti, Bhadriraju, ed. (1972). Māṇḍalika Writtipadakōśam: A Telugu Dialect Dictionary of Occupational Vocabularies. Vol. II: Handloom Vocabulary. Hyderabad: A.P. Sahitya Akademi.
- A. Ramakrishna Rao & D.V. Avadhani (1974). Krishnamurti, Bhadriraju (ed.). Tikkana padaprayōga kōśam (A Concordance of Tikkana's Māhābhārata, a literary work of the 13th century). Vol. II. Hyderabad: A.P. Sahitya Akademi.
- Krishnamurti, Bhadriraju (ed.). Telugu bhāSā caritra (A History of the Telugu Language). Hyderabad: A.P. Sahitya Akademi (2nd edition 1979; reprinted six times by Telugu University till 2006).
- A. Ramakrishna Rao & D.V. Avadhani (1977). Krishnamurti, Bhadriraju (ed.). Tikkana padaprayōga kōśam (A Concordance of Tikkana's Mahābhārata, a literary work of the 13th Century). Vol. III. Hyderabad: A.P. Sahitya Akademi.
- Budaraju Radhakrishna (1996). Krishnamurti, Bhadriraju (ed.). Bhāratīya Sāhityam: Samakālika kathānikalu (Contemporary Indian Short Stories) [in English]. New Delhi: Sahitya Akademi.
