= Kunduvadi language =

Southern Dravidian language of India

Kunduvadi
- Native to: India
- Native speakers: 1,000 (2004)
- Language family: Dravidian: Southern; Southern I; Tamil–Kannada; Tamil–Kota; Tamil–Toda; Tamil–Irula; Tamil–Kodava–Urali; Tamil–Malayalam; Malayalamoid; Kalanadi–Kunduvadi–Pathiya; Kunduvadi
- Early forms: Old Tamil: Middle Tamil

Language codes
- ISO 639-3: wku
- Glottolog: kund1253

Kunduvadi (IPA: [kuɳɖuʋɐɖi]) is a Southern Dravidian language of India. It is structurally similar to Malayalam, but is closer to Pathiya.
