= Dravidian languages =

Language family

Dravidian
- Geographic distribution: South India, north-east and central Sri Lanka and south-west Pakistan
- Ethnicity: Dravidian peoples
- Native speakers: 250 million (2020)
- Linguistic classification: One of the world's primary language families
- Proto-language: Proto-Dravidian
- Subdivisions: North; Central; South-Central; South

Language codes
- ISO 639-2 / 5: dra
- Glottolog: drav1251
- Linguasphere: 49=
- Distribution of the Dravidian languages

The Dravidian languages are a family of languages spoken by 250 million people, primarily in South India, but also in parts of North India, Bangladesh and Nepal, north-east Sri Lanka, and south-west Pakistan, with pockets in Afghanistan and Iran.

The most commonly spoken Dravidian languages (in descending order) are Telugu, Tamil, Kannada, and Malayalam, all of which have long literary traditions. Smaller literary languages include Tulu and Kodava. Together with several smaller languages such as Gondi, these languages cover the southern part of India and the northeast of Sri Lanka, and account for the overwhelming majority of speakers of Dravidian languages. Malto and Kurukh are spoken in isolated pockets in eastern India. Kurukh is also spoken in parts of Nepal, Bhutan, and Bangladesh. Brahui is mostly spoken in the Balochistan region of Pakistan, Iranian Balochistan, Afghanistan, and around the Marw oasis in Turkmenistan. During the British colonial period, Dravidian speakers were sent as indentured labourers to Southeast Asia, Mauritius, South Africa, Fiji, the Caribbean, and East Africa. There are more-recent Dravidian-speaking diaspora communities in the Middle East, Europe, North America, and Oceania.

Dravidian is first attested in the 2nd century BCE, as inscriptions in Tamil-Brahmi script on cave walls in the Madurai and Tirunelveli districts of Tamil Nadu. (Note: Earlier fragmentary finds have been claimed, e.g. at Keezhadi near Madurai, Tamil Nadu, but have not been conclusively established (see § Literature).) Dravidian place names along the Arabian Sea coast and signs of Dravidian phonological and grammatical influence (e.g. retroflex consonants) in the Indo-Aryan languages (c.1500 BCE) suggest that some form of proto-Dravidian was spoken more widely across the Indian subcontinent before the spread of the Indo-Aryan languages. Though some scholars have argued that the Dravidian languages may have been brought to India by migrations from the Iranian plateau in the fourth or third millennium BCE, or even earlier, the reconstructed vocabulary of proto-Dravidian suggests that the family is indigenous to India. (Note: Renfrew and Bahn conclude that several scenarios are compatible with the data, and that "the linguistic jury is still very much out.") Suggestions that the Indus script records a Dravidian language remain unproven. Despite many attempts, the family has not been shown to be related to any other.

== Dravidian studies ==
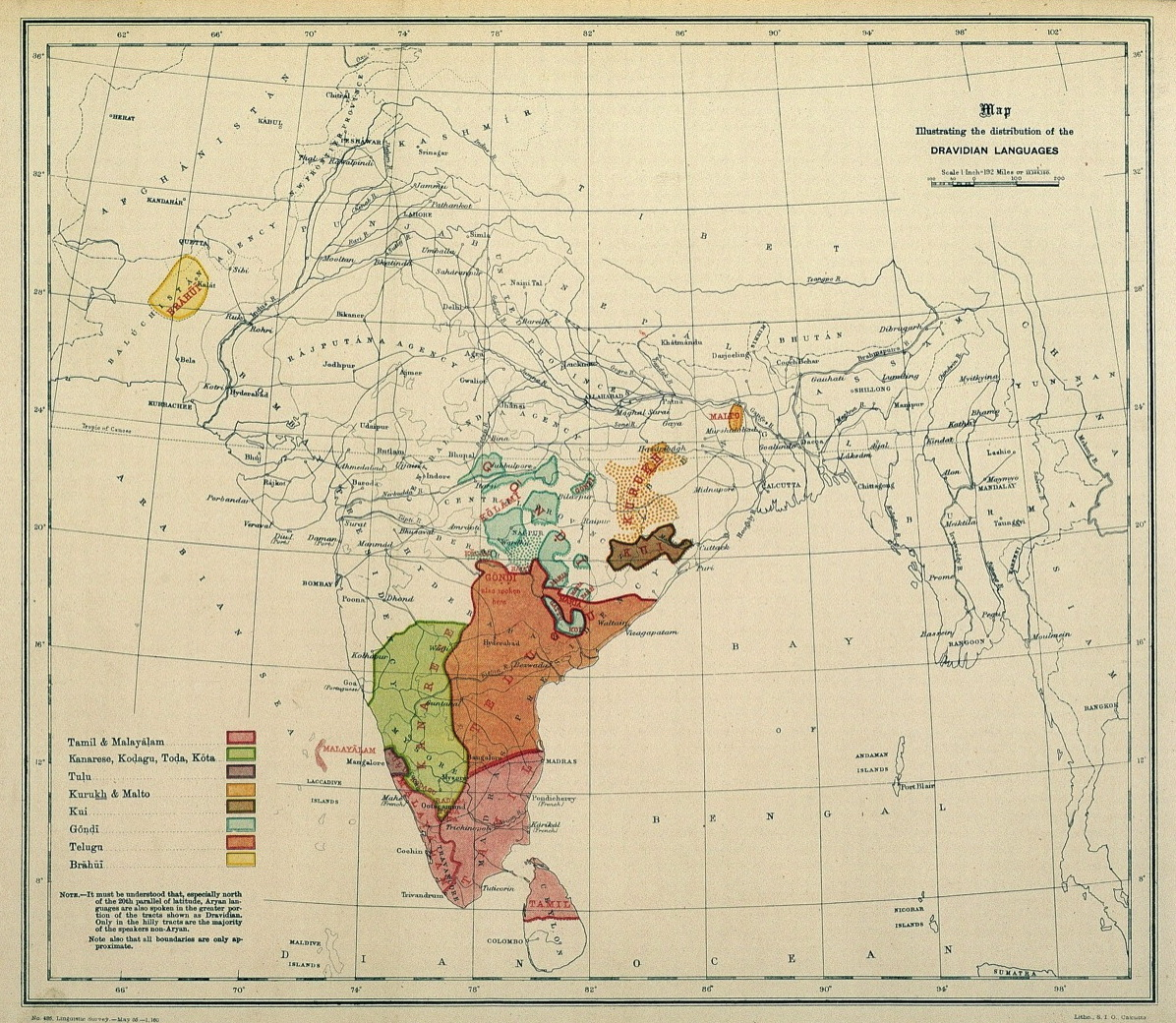
Linguistic Survey of India (1906), map of the distribution of Dravidian languages

The 14th-century Sanskrit text Lilatilakam, a grammar of Manipravalam, states that the spoken languages of present-day Kerala and Tamil Nadu were similar, terming them as "Dramiḍa". The author does not consider the "Karṇṇāṭa" (Kannada) and the "Āndhra" (Telugu) languages as "Dramiḍa", because they were very different from the language of the "Tamil Veda" (Tiruvaymoli), but states that some people would include them in the "Dramiḍa" category.

In 1816, Francis Whyte Ellis argued that Tamil, Telugu, Kannada, Malayalam, Tulu and Kodava descended from a common, non-Indo-European ancestor. He supported his argument with a detailed comparison of non-Sanskrit vocabulary in Telugu, Kannada and Tamil, and also demonstrated that they shared grammatical structures. In 1844, Christian Lassen discovered that Brahui was related to these languages. In 1856, Robert Caldwell published his Comparative Grammar of the Dravidian or South-Indian Family of Languages, which considerably expanded the Dravidian umbrella and established Dravidian as one of the major language groups of the world.

In 1961, T. Burrow and M. B. Emeneau published the Dravidian Etymological Dictionary, with a major revision in 1984.

== Name ==
Robert Caldwell coined the term "Dravidian" for this family of languages, based on the usage of the Sanskrit word Draviḍa in the work Tantravārttika by Kumārila Bhaṭṭa:

The word I have chosen is 'Dravidian', from Drāviḍa, the adjectival form of Draviḍa. This term, it is true, has sometimes been used, and is still sometimes used, in almost as restricted a sense as that of Tamil itself, so that though on the whole it is the best term I can find, I admit it is not perfectly free from ambiguity. It is a term which has already been used more or less distinctively by Sanskrit philologists, as a generic appellation for the South Indian people and their languages, and it is the only single term they ever seem to have used in this manner. I have, therefore, no doubt of the propriety of adopting it.

— Robert Caldwell

The origin of the Sanskrit word drāviḍa is the Tamil word Tamiḻ. Kamil Zvelebil cites the forms such as dramila (in Daṇḍin's Sanskrit work Avantisundarīkathā) and damiḷa (found in the Sri Lankan (Ceylonese) chronicle Mahavamsa) and then goes on to say, "The forms damiḷa/damila almost certainly provide a connection of dr(a/ā)viḍa" with the indigenous name of the Tamil language, the likely derivation being "*tamiḻ > *damiḷ > damiḷa- / damila- and further, with the intrusive, 'hypercorrect' (or perhaps analogical) -r-, into dr(a/ā)viḍa. The -m-/-v- alternation is a common enough phenomenon in Dravidian phonology".

Bhadriraju Krishnamurti states in his reference book The Dravidian languages:

Joseph (1989: IJDL 18.2:134–42) gives extensive references to the use of the term draviḍa, dramila first as the name of a people, then of a country. Sinhala BCE inscriptions cite dameḍa-, damela- denoting Tamil merchants. Early Buddhist and Jaina sources used damiḷa- to refer to a people of south India (presumably Tamil); damilaraṭṭha- was a southern non-Aryan country; dramiḷa-, dramiḍa, and draviḍa- were used as variants to designate a country in the south (Bṛhatsamhita-, Kādambarī, Daśakumāracarita-, fourth to seventh centuries CE) (1989: 134–138). It appears that damiḷa- was older than draviḍa- which could be its Sanskritization.

Based on what Krishnamurti states (referring to a scholarly paper published in the International Journal of Dravidian Linguistics), the Sanskrit word draviḍa itself appeared later than damiḷa, since the dates for the forms with -r- are centuries later than the dates for the forms without -r- (damiḷa, dameḍa-, damela- etc.).

== Classification ==
The Dravidian languages form a close-knit family. Most scholars agree on four groups:

- South Dravidian (Tamil–Tulu, or South Dravidian I)
  - Tamil–Kannada
              - Tamiloid, including Tamil
              - Malayalamoid, including Malayalam
            - Irula
          - Kodava
        - Toda
      - Kota
    - Kannadoid, including Kannada and Badaga
    - Koraga
    - Tulu
    - Kudiya
- South-Central Dravidian (Telugu-Kui, or South Dravidian II)
  - Teluguoid, including Telugu
  - Gondi-Kui
    - Gondoid, including Gondi and Koya
      - Konda
          - Manda
          - Pengo
          - Kuvi
          - Kui
- Central Dravidian (Kolami–Parji)
    - Kolami
    - Naiki
    - Gadaba
      - Ollari
      - Kondekor
    - Duruwa (or Parji)
- North Dravidian (Brahui-Kurukh)
  - Kurukh–Malto
    - Kurukh (Oraon, Kisan)
    - Malto (Kumarbhag Paharia, Sauria Paharia)
  - Brahui

There are different proposals regarding the relationship between these groups. Earlier classifications grouped Central and South-Central Dravidian in a single branch. On the other hand, Krishnamurti groups South-Central and South Dravidian together on the basis of shared innovations:

- Proto-Dravidian *i and *u are lowered to *e and *o respectively before a low vowel *a.
- Initial *c > *s > *h > zero.
- A secondary form of ﬁrst person singular pronouns, derived from the Proto-Dravidian inclusive plural (see § Pronouns).
- Paired intransitive and transitive verb stems.
- A causative marker derived from ∗-ppi.

There are other disagreements, including whether there is a Toda-Kota branch or whether Kota diverged first and later Toda (claimed by Krishnamurti).

Some authors deny that North Dravidian forms a valid subgroup, splitting it into Northeast (Kurukh–Malto) and Northwest (Brahui). Their affiliation has been proposed based primarily on a small number of common phonetic developments, including:

- In some words, *k is retracted or spirantised, shifting to /x/ in Kurukh and Brahui, /q/ in Malto.
- In some words, *c is retracted to /k/.
- Word-initial *v develops to /b/. This development is, however, also found in several other Dravidian languages, including Kannada, Kodagu and Tulu.

McAlpin (2003) notes that no exact conditioning can be established for the first two changes, and proposes that distinct Proto-Dravidian *q and *kʲ should be reconstructed behind these correspondences, and that Brahui, Kurukh-Malto, and the rest of Dravidian may be three coordinate branches, possibly with Brahui being the earliest language to split off. A few morphological parallels between Brahui and Kurukh-Malto are also known, but according to McAlpin they are analysable as shared archaisms rather than shared innovations.

In addition, Glottolog lists several unclassified Dravidian languages: Kumbaran, Kakkala (both of Tamil-Malayalam) and Khirwar.

A computational phylogenetic study of the Dravidian language family was undertaken by Kolipakam, et al. (2018). They support the internal coherence of the four Dravidian branches South (or South Dravidian I), South-Central (or South Dravidian II), Central, and North, but is uncertain about the precise relationships of these four branches to each other. The date of Dravidian is estimated to be 4,500 years old.

== Distribution ==
Speakers of Dravidian languages, by language
1. Telugu (34.5%)
2. Tamil (29.0%)
3. Kannada (15.4%)
4. Malayalam (14.4%)
5. Gondi (1.20%)
6. Brahui (0.90%)
7. Tulu (0.70%)
8. Kurukh (0.80%)
9. Beary (0.70%)
10. Others (2.30%)

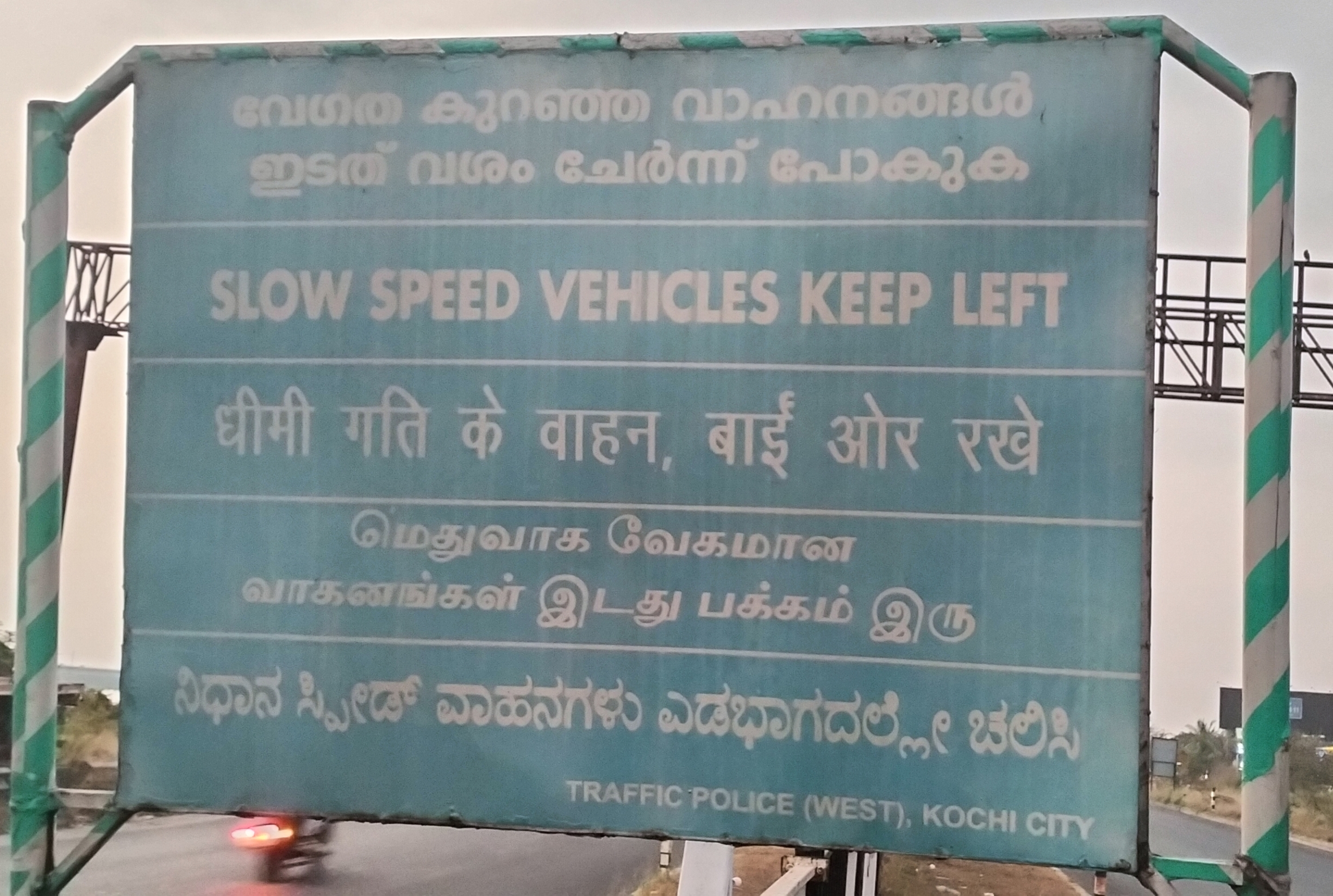
A pentalingual highway sign in Kochi written in Malayalam, English, Hindi, Tamil and Kannada.

Dravidian languages are mostly located in the southern and central parts of south Asia with 2 main outliers, Brahui having speakers in Balochistan and as far north as Merv, Turkmenistan, and Kurukh to the east in Jharkhand and as far northeast as Bhutan, Nepal and Assam.

Since 1981, the Census of India has reported only languages with more than 10,000 speakers, including 17 Dravidian languages. In 1981, these accounted for approximately 24% of India's population. In the 2001 census, they included 214 million people, about 21% of India's total population of 1.02 billion. In addition, the largest Dravidian-speaking group outside India, Tamil speakers in Sri Lanka, number around 4.7 million. The total number of speakers of Dravidian languages is around 227 million people, around 13% of the population of the Indian subcontinent.

The largest group of the Dravidian languages is South Dravidian, with almost 150 million speakers. Tamil, Kannada and Malayalam make up around 98% of the speakers, with 75 million, 44 million and 37 million native speakers, respectively.

The next-largest is the South-Central branch, which has 78 million native speakers, the vast majority of whom speak Telugu. The total number of speakers of Telugu, including those whose first language is not Telugu, is around 85 million people. This branch also includes the tribal language Gondi spoken in central India.

The second-smallest branch is the Northern branch, with around 6.3 million speakers. This is the only sub-group to have a language spoken in Pakistan – Brahui.

The smallest branch is the Central branch, which has only around 200,000 speakers. These languages are mostly tribal, and spoken in central India.

Languages recognised as official languages of India appear here in boldface.

North Dravidian languages
Language	Number of speakers	Location
Brahui	2,430,000	Balochistan (Pakistan), Helmand (Afghanistan), Beluchistan, Kerman (Iran)
Kurukh	2,280,000	Chhattisgarh, Jharkhand, Odisha, West Bengal, Bihar (India)
Malto	234,000	Bihar, Jharkhand, West Bengal (India)
Kurambhag Paharia	12,500	Jharkhand, West Bengal, Odisha

Central Dravidian languages
Language	Number of speakers	Location
Kolami	122,000	Maharashtra, Telangana
Duruwa	51,000	Odisha, Chhattisgarh, Andhra Pradesh
Ollari	15,000	Odisha, Andhra Pradesh
Naiki	10,000	Maharashtra

South-Central Dravidian languages
Language	Number of speakers	Location
**Telugu**	83,000,000	Andhra Pradesh, Telangana and parts of Karnataka (Chikkaballapura (27.07%), Kolar (22.67%), Bangalore Urban (13.99%), Bangalore Rural (12.84%), Bellary (9.68%), Raichur (8.11%), Chitradurga (5.39%), Yadgir (5.20%));Tamil Nadu, Kerala, Maharashtra, Odisha, Chhattisgarh, West Bengal, Gujarat, Delhi, Puducherry, Andaman and Nicobar Islands. Outside India in United States, Australia, Canada, United Kingdom, New Zealand, France, Germany, Italy, Malaysia, Mauritius, Fiji, UAE, Saudi Arabia, Bahrain, Kuwait, Qatar, Oman, South Africa.
Gondi	2,980,000 (claimed, possibly much greater)	Madhya Pradesh, Maharashtra, Chhattisgarh, Telangana, Odisha, Andhra Pradesh
Kui	942,000	Odisha, Andhra Pradesh
Koya	360,000	Andhra Pradesh, Telangana, Chhattisgarh
Madiya	360,000	Chhattisgarh, Telangana, Maharashtra
Kuvi	155,000	Odisha, Andhra Pradesh
Pengo	350,000	Odisha
Pardhan	135,000	Telangana, Chhattisgarh, Maharashtra, Madhya Pradesh
Chenchu	26,000	Andhra Pradesh, Telangana
Konda	20,000	Andhra Pradesh, Odisha
Muria	15,000	Chhattisgarh, Maharashtra, Odisha
Manda	4,040	Odisha

South Dravidian languages
Language	Number of speakers	Location
**Tamil**	75,000,000	Tamil Nadu, Puducherry (including Karaikal), parts of Andhra Pradesh (Chittoor, Nellore, Tirupati, Annamayya), parts of Karnataka (Bengaluru, Bengaluru Rural, Chamarajanagar, Kolar, Mysuru, Ramanagara), parts of Kerala (Palakkad, Idukki, Thiruvananthapuram), parts of Telangana (Hyderabad), parts of Maharashtra (Mumbai, Mumbai Suburban, Thane, Pune), parts of Gujarat (Ahmedabad, Vadodara, Surat), Delhi, Andaman and Nicobar, Sri Lanka, Singapore, Malaysia, Mauritius, Canada, United States, United Kingdom, France, Germany, Italy, Switzerland, Netherlands, Norway, Sweden, Denmark, Finland, United Arab Emirates, Qatar, Kuwait, Oman, Bahrain, China, Saudi Arabia, Australia, New Zealand, Russia, South Africa, Japan, South Korea, Thailand, Indonesia, Vietnam, Myanmar, Réunion and Seychelles
**Kannada**	44,000,000	Karnataka, parts of Kerala (Kasaragod, Kannur, Wayanad), parts of Maharashtra (Kolhapur, Solapur, Sangli), parts of Tamil Nadu (Chennai, Coimbatore, Salem, Nilgiris, Krishnagiri), parts of Andhra Pradesh (Anantapur, Kurnool), parts of Telangana (Hyderabad, Medak, Jogulamba Gadwal, Narayanpet, Sangareddy, Vikarabad district), parts of Gujarat (Ahmedabad, Surat, Vadodara), United States, Australia, Germany, United Kingdom, United Arab Emirates, Bahrain, Netherlands
**Malayalam**	37,000,000	Kerala, Lakshadweep, Mahe district of Puducherry, Parts of Karnataka (Dakshina Kannada, Udupi, Kodagu, Mysore and Bangalore), parts of Tamil Nadu (Chennai, Coimbatore, Nilgiris, and Kanyakumari), Maharashtra (Mumbai, Mumbai Suburban, Thane, Pune), Gujarat (Surat, Ahmedabad), Delhi, United Arab Emirates, United States, Saudi Arabia, Kuwait, Oman, United Kingdom, Qatar, Bahrain, Australia, New Zealand, Canada, Malaysia, Singapore, Israel, Ireland, Germany, Austria Finland, Japan, Pakistan
Tulu	1,850,000	Karnataka (Dakshina Kannada, Udupi districts) and Kerala (Kasaragod district), Across Maharashtra and Gujarat, especially in cities like Mumbai, Thane, Surat, etc. and Gulf Countries (UAE, Saudi Arabia, Kuwait, Oman, Qatar, Bahrain)
Beary	1,500,000	Karnataka (Dakshina Kannada, Udupi districts) and Kerala (Kasaragod district) and Gulf Countries (UAE, Saudi Arabia, Kuwait, Oman, Qatar, Bahrain)
Pattapu	200,000+	Andhra Pradesh
Irula	200,000	Tamil Nadu (Nilgiris district), Karnataka (Mysore district)
Kurumba	180,000	Tamil Nadu (Nilgiris district)
Badaga	133,000	Karnataka (Mysore district), Tamil Nadu (Nilgiris district)
Kodava	114,000	Karnataka (Kodagu district)
Jeseri	65,000	Lakshadweep
Yerukala	58,000	Karnataka, Kerala, Andhra Pradesh, Tamil Nadu, Telangana
Betta Kurumba	32,000	Karnataka (Chamarajanagar district, Kodagu district, Mysore district), Kerala (Wayanad district), Tamil Nadu (Nilgiris District)
Kurichiya	29,000	Kerala (Kannur district, Kozhikode district, Wayanad district)
Ravula	27,000	Karnataka (Kodagu district), Kerala (Kannur district, Wayanad district)
Mullu Kurumba	26,000	Kerala (Wayanad district), Tamil Nadu (The Nilgiris District)
Sholaga	24,000	Tamil Nadu, Karnataka (Mysore district)
Kaikadi	26,000	Madhya Pradesh (Betul district), Maharashtra (Amravati district)
Paniya	22,000	Karnataka (Kodagu district), Kerala, Tamil Nadu
Kanikkaran	19,000	Kerala, Tamil Nadu (Kanyakumari district, Tirunelveli district)
Malankuravan	18,600	Tamil Nadu (Kanyakumari district), Kerala (Kollam district, Kottayam district, Thiruvananthapuram district)
Muthuvan	16,800	Andhra Pradesh, Kerala, Tamil Nadu (Coimbatore district, Madurai district)
Koraga	14,000	Karnataka (Dakshina Kannada, Udupi districts) and Kerala (Kasaragod district)
Kumbaran	10,000	Kerala (Kozhikode district, Malappuram district, Wayanad district)
Paliyan	9,500	Kerala (Idukki district, Ernakulam district, Kottayam district), Tamil Nadu, Karnataka
Malasar	7,800	Kerala (Palakkad district), Tamil Nadu (Coimbatore district)
Malapandaram	5,900	Kerala (Kollam district, Pathanamthitta district), Tamil Nadu (Coimbatore district, Madurai district, Viluppuram district)
Eravallan	5,000	Kerala (Palakkad district), Tamil Nadu (Coimbatore district)
Wayanad Chetti	5,000	Karnataka, Kerala (Wayanad district), Tamil Nadu (Coimbatore district, The Nilgiris District, Erode district)
Muduga	3,400	Kerala (Palakkad district), Tamil Nadu (Coimbatore district, The Nilgiris District)
Thachanadan	3,000	Kerala (Malappuram district, Wayanad district)
Kadar	2,960	Kerala (Thrissur district, Palakkad district), Tamil Nadu (Coimbatore district)
Kudiya	2,800	Karnataka (Dakshina Kannada, Udupi, Kodagu districts) and Kerala (Kasaragod district, Kannur district)
Toda	1,560	Karnataka (Mysore district), Tamil Nadu (Nilgiris district)
Attapady Kurumba	1,370	Kerala (Palakkad district)
Kunduvadi	1,000	Kerala (Kozhikode district, Wayanad district)
Mala Malasar	1,000	Kerala (Palakkad district), Tamil Nadu (Coimbatore district)
Pathiya	1,000	Kerala (Wayanad district)
Kota	930	Tamil Nadu (Nilgiris district)
Kalanadi	750	Kerala (Wayanad district)
Holiya	500	Madhya Pradesh (Balaghat district, Seoni district), Maharashtra, Karnataka
Allar	350	Kerala (Palakkad district, Malappuram district)
Aranadan	200	Kerala (Malappuram district)
Vishavan	150	Kerala (Ernakulam district, Kottayam district, Thrissur district)

Unclassified Dravidian languages
Language	Number of speakers	Location
Khirwar	26,000	Chhattisgarh (Surguja district)
Kumbaran	10,000	
Cholanaikkan	290	Kerala (Malappuram district)
Kakkala		Kerala

Extinct Dravidian languages
Language	Branch	Location
Bellari	Tuluoid	Kerala, Karnataka
Malaryan	Malayalamoid	Kerala, Tamil Nadu
Nagarchal	Gondic	Madhya Pradesh (Balaghat, Chhindwara, Jabalpur, Mandla and Seoni districts)
Ullatan	Malayalamoid	Kerala

== Proposed relations with other families ==
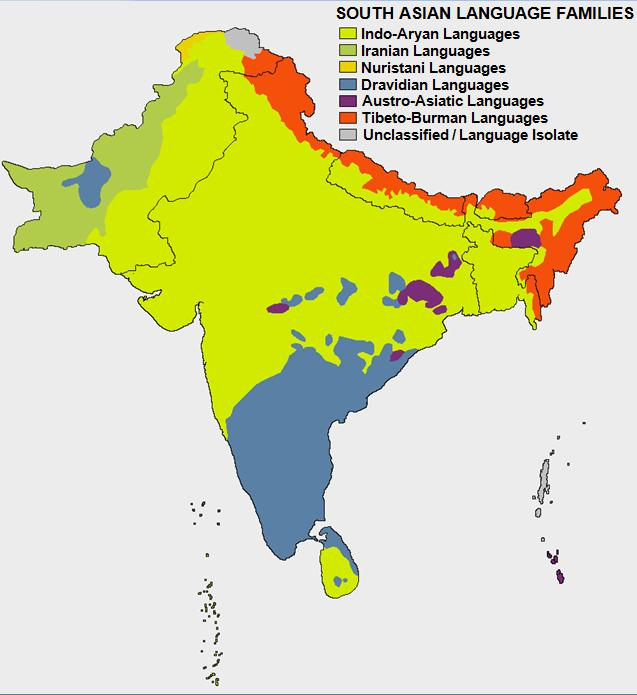
Language families in South Asia

Researchers have tried but have been unable to prove a connection between the Dravidian languages with other language families, including Indo-European, Hurrian, Basque, Sumerian, Korean, and Japanese. Comparisons have been made not just with the other language families of the Indian subcontinent (Indo-European, Austroasiatic, Sino-Tibetan, and Nihali), but with all typologically similar language families of the Old World. Nonetheless, although there are no readily detectable genealogical connections, Dravidian shares several areal features with the Indo-Aryan languages, which have been attributed to the influence of a Dravidian substratum on Indo-Aryan.

Dravidian languages display typological similarities with the Uralic language group, and there have been several attempts to establish a genetic relationship in the past. This idea has been popular amongst Dravidian linguists, including Robert Caldwell, Thomas Burrow, Kamil Zvelebil, and Mikhail Andronov. The hypothesis is, however, rejected by most specialists in Uralic languages, and also in recent times by Dravidian linguists such as Bhadriraju Krishnamurti.

In the early 1970s, the linguist David McAlpin produced a detailed proposal of a genetic relationship between Dravidian and the extinct Elamite language of ancient Elam (present-day southwestern Iran). The Elamo-Dravidian hypothesis was supported in the late 1980s by the archaeologist Colin Renfrew and the geneticist Luigi Luca Cavalli-Sforza, who suggested that Proto-Dravidian was brought to India by farmers from the Iranian part of the Fertile Crescent. (In his 2000 book, Cavalli-Sforza suggested western India, northern India and northern Iran as alternative starting points.) However, linguists have found McAlpin's cognates unconvincing and criticised his proposed phonological rules as ad hoc. Elamite is generally believed by scholars to be a language isolate, and the theory has had no effect on studies of the language. In 2012, Southworth suggested a "Zagrosian family" of West Asian origin including Elamite, Brahui and Dravidian as its three branches.

== Prehistory ==
The origins of the Dravidian languages, as well as their subsequent development and the period of their differentiation are unclear, partially due to the lack of comparative linguistic research into the Dravidian languages. Some scholars have suggested that the Dravidian languages were the most widespread indigenous languages in the Indian subcontinent before the advance of the Indo-Aryan languages. Though some scholars have argued that the Dravidian languages may have been brought to India by migrations from the Iranian plateau in the fourth or third millennium BCE or even earlier, reconstructed proto-Dravidian vocabulary suggests that the family is indigenous to India.

=== Proto-Dravidian and onset of diversification ===
As a proto-language, the Proto-Dravidian language is not itself attested in the historical record. Its modern conception is based solely on reconstruction. It was suggested in the 1980s that the language was spoken in the 4th millennium BCE, and started developing into various branches around the 3rd millennium BCE. According to Krishnamurti, Proto-Dravidian may have been spoken in the Indus civilisation, suggesting a "tentative date of Proto-Dravidian around the early part of the third millennium." Krishnamurti further states that South Dravidian I (including pre-Tamil) and South Dravidian II (including Pre-Telugu) split around the 11th century BCE, with the other major branches splitting off at around the same time. Kolipakam et al. (2018) give a similar estimate of 2,500 BCE for Proto-Dravidian. Southworth proposes to identify the proto-Dravidian-speaking population with the Southern Neolithic complex, which expanded from the Andhra-Karnataka border region in the middle of the 3rd millennium BCE.

Historically, Maharashtra, Gujarat, and Sindh may also have had Dravidian-speaking populations, based on the evidence of place names (like -v(a)li, -koṭ from Dravidian paḷḷi, kōṭṭai), grammatical features in Marathi, Gujarati, and Sindhi, and Dravidian-like kinship systems in southern Indo-Aryan languages. Proto-Dravidian could have been spoken in a wider area, perhaps into Central India or the western Deccan which may have had other forms of early Dravidian/pre-Proto-Dravidian or other branches of Dravidian which are currently unknown.

The Sindhi version of Gilli Danda uses Teluguoid like numerals for counting: ikaṭ, bakaṭ/bikaṭ, lēn/lān, mūn/mūr, nār, ār, vey, jag̈/yukū, compare Telugu okaṭi, reṇḍu, mūḍu, nālku, aidu, āru, ēḍu, enimidi, tommidi, padi. A case similar to Celtic Yan tan tethera in Northern England.

Several geneticists have noted a strong correlation between Dravidian and the Ancestral South Indian (ASI) component of South Asian genetic makeup. Narasimhan et al. (2019) argue that the ASI component itself formed in the early 2nd millennium BCE from a mixture of a population associated with the Indus Valley civilisation and a population resident in peninsular India. They conclude that one of these two groups may have been the source of proto-Dravidian. An Indus valley origin would be consistent with the location of Brahui and with attempts to interpret the Indus script as Dravidian. However, many scholars believe that Brahui arrived in the northwest much later. Also, reconstructed Proto-Dravidian terms for flora and fauna provide support for a peninsular Indian origin.

=== Indus Valley Civilisation ===
The Indus Valley civilisation (3300–1900 BCE), located in the Indus Valley region, is sometimes suggested to have been Dravidian. Already in 1924, after discovering the Indus Valley Civilisation, John Marshall stated that one or more of the languages may have been Dravidic. Cultural and linguistic similarities have been cited by researchers Henry Heras, Kamil Zvelebil, Asko Parpola and Iravatham Mahadevan as being strong evidence for a proto-Dravidian origin of the ancient Indus Valley civilisation. The discovery in Tamil Nadu of a late Neolithic (early 2nd millennium BCE, i.e. post-dating Harappan decline) stone celt allegedly marked with Indus signs has been considered by some to be significant for the Dravidian identification.

Yuri Knorozov surmised that the symbols represent a logosyllabic script and suggested, based on computer analysis, an underlying agglutinative Dravidian language as the most likely candidate for the underlying language. Knorozov's suggestion was preceded by the work of Henry Heras, who suggested several readings of signs based on a proto-Dravidian assumption.

Linguist Asko Parpola writes that the Indus script and Harappan language are "most likely to have belonged to the Dravidian family". Parpola led a Finnish team in investigating the inscriptions using computer analysis. Based on a proto-Dravidian assumption, they proposed readings of many signs, some agreeing with the suggested readings of Heras and Knorozov (such as equating the "fish" sign with the Dravidian word for fish, "min") but disagreeing on several other readings. A comprehensive description of Parpola's work until 1994 is given in his book Deciphering the Indus Script.

=== Northern Dravidian pockets ===
Although in modern times speakers of the various Dravidian languages have mainly occupied the southern portion of India, in earlier times they probably were spoken in a larger area. After the Indo-Aryan migrations into north-western India, starting c. 1500 BCE, and the establishment of the Kuru kingdom c. 1100 BCE, a process of Sanskritisation of the masses started, which resulted in a language shift in northern India. Southern India has remained majority Dravidian, but pockets of Dravidian can be found in central India, Pakistan, Bangladesh and Nepal.

The Kurukh and Malto are pockets of Dravidian languages in North Eastern India. They have myths about external origins. The Kurukh have traditionally claimed to be from the Deccan Peninsula, more specifically Karnataka. The same tradition has existed of the Brahui, who call themselves immigrants. Holding this same view of the Brahui are many scholars such as L. H. Horace Perera and M. Ratnasabapathy.

The Brahui population of Pakistan's Balochistan province has been taken by some as the linguistic equivalent of a relict population, perhaps indicating that Dravidian languages were formerly much more widespread and were supplanted by the incoming Indo-Aryan languages. However, Brahui lacks any Old Iranian loanwords, with most of its Iranian vocabulary coming from Balochi, a Western Iranian language that arrived in the area from the west only around 1000 CE. Sound changes shared with Kurukh and Malto also suggest that Brahui was originally spoken near them in central India.

=== Dravidian influence on Sanskrit ===
Dravidian languages show extensive lexical (vocabulary) borrowing, but only a few traits of structural (either phonological or grammatical) borrowing from Indo-Aryan, whereas Indo-Aryan shows more structural than lexical borrowings from the Dravidian languages. Many of these features are already present in the oldest known Indo-Aryan language, the language of the Rigveda (c. 1500 BCE), which also includes over a dozen words borrowed from Dravidian, including ulūkhala- 'mortar', khála- 'threshing floor' and mayūra 'peacock'.

Vedic Sanskrit has retroflex consonants (ṭ/ḍ, ṇ) with about 88 words in the Rigveda having unconditioned retroflexes. Some sample words are Iṭanta, Kaṇva, śakaṭī, kevaṭa, puṇya and maṇḍūka. Since other Indo-European languages, including other Indo-Iranian languages, lack retroflex consonants, their presence in Indo-Aryan is often cited as evidence of substrate influence from close contact of the Vedic speakers with speakers of a foreign language family rich in retroflex consonants. The Dravidian family is a serious candidate since it is rich in retroflex phonemes reconstructible back to the Proto-Dravidian stage.

In addition, a number of grammatical features of Vedic Sanskrit not found in its sister Avestan language appear to have been borrowed from Dravidian languages. These include the gerund, which has the same function as in Dravidian. Some linguists explain this asymmetrical borrowing by arguing that Middle Indo-Aryan languages were built on a Dravidian substratum. These scholars argue that the most plausible explanation for the presence of Dravidian structural features in Indic is language shift, that is, native Dravidian speakers learning and adopting Indic languages due to elite dominance. Although each of the innovative traits in Indic could be accounted for by internal explanations, early Dravidian influence is the only explanation that can account for all of the innovations at once; moreover, it accounts for several of the innovative traits in Indic better than any internal explanation that has been proposed.

== Phonology ==
Proto-Dravidian, unlike Sanskrit and other Indo-Iranian languages of South Asia, lacked both an aspiration and voicing contrast. The situation varies considerably amongst its daughter languages and often also between registers of any single language. The vast majority of modern Dravidian languages generally have some voicing distinctions amongst stops; as for aspiration, it appears in at least the formal varieties of the so-called "literary" Dravidian languages (except Tamil) today, but may be rare or entirely absent in less formal registers, as well as in the many "non-literary" Dravidian languages.

At one extreme, Tamil, like Proto-Dravidian, does not phonemically distinguish between voiced and voiceless or unaspirated and aspirated sounds, even in formal speech; in fact, the Tamil alphabet lacks symbols for voiced and aspirated stops. At the other end, Brahui is exceptional among the Dravidian languages in possessing and commonly employing the entire inventory of aspirates employed in neighbouring Sindhi. While aspirates are particularly concentrated in the Indo-Aryan element of the lexicon, some Brahui words with Dravidian roots have developed aspiration as well.

Most languages lie in between. Voicing contrasts are quite common in all registers of speech in most Dravidian languages. Aspiration contrasts are less common, but relatively well-established in the phonologies of the higher or more formal registers, as well as in the standard orthographies, of the "literary" languages (other than Tamil): Telugu, Kannada, and Malayalam. However, in colloquial or non-standard speech, aspiration often appears inconsistently or not at all, even if it occurs in the standard spelling of the word.

In the languages in which aspirates are found, they primarily occur in the large numbers of loanwords from Sanskrit and other Indo-Iranian languages, though some are found in etymologically native words as well, often as the result of plosive + laryngeal clusters being reanalysed as aspirates (e.g. Telugu నలభై nalabhai, Kannada ಎಂಬತ್ತು/ಎಂಭತ್ತು emb(h)attu, Adilabad Gondi phōṛd).

Dravidian languages are also historically characterised by a three-way distinction between dental, alveolar, and retroflex places of articulation as well as large numbers of liquids. Currently the three-way coronal distinction is only found in Malayalam, Sri Lankan Tamil, and the various languages of the Nilgiri Mountains, all of which belong to the Tamil–Kannada branch of the family.

All other Dravidian languages maintain only a two-way distinction between dentals and retroflexes, largely the result of merging the alveolars with the dentals or retroflexes, or via rhotacisation. The latter is found primarily among the South and South Central languages, where many languages merged the singular proto-Dravidian alveolar plosive *ṯ with the alveolar trill /r/; subsequently, in some of these languages, the trill evolved into the alveolar tap /ɾ/ or underwent other sound changes (Tulu has /d͡ʒ, d̪, ɾ/ as reflexes, Manda-Kui has /d͡ʒ/, and Hill-Maria Gondi has /ʁ/).

=== Proto-Dravidian ===
Proto-Dravidian had five short and long vowels: *a, *ā, *i, *ī, *u, *ū, *e, *ē, *o, *ō. There were no diphthongs; ai and au are treated as *ay and *av (or *aw). The five-vowel system with phonemic length is largely preserved in the descendant subgroups, but there are some notable exceptions. The Nilgiri languages (except Kota but including Kodagu) developing a series of central vowels which formed from vowels near retroflex and alveolar consonants. The short u phoneme (mostly word finally) became ŭ/ụ /ɯ~ɨ~ə/ and also became phonemic in Tulu and Malayalam, mostly caused by loaning words with rounded /u/. Brahui has a slightly poorer vowel system, where short e and o merged with other vowels due to the influence of neighbouring Indo-Aryan and Iranian languages, leaving only long counterparts.

The following consonantal phonemes are reconstructed:

	Labial	Dental	Alveolar	Retroflex	Palatal	Velar	Glottal
Plosives	*p	*t	*ṯ	*ṭ	*c	*k	
Nasals	*m	*n	(*ṉ) (Note: reconstructed by P. S. Subrahmanyam)	*ṇ	*ñ		
Laterals			*l	*ḷ			
Rhotics			*r	*ẓ (Note: may also be represented as ḻ or r̤)			
Semivowels	*w				*y		*H

- The *ṯ developed into a trill (with *r being a tap) in South and South Central Dravidian.In Central Dravidian and North Dravidian it merged with the dental and retroflex stops.
- Except for the Tamil-Malayalam languages (including modern spoken Tamil), all Dravidian languages developed a voicing distinction for plosives. If loans are included, all of them have a voicing distinction.

== Grammar ==
The most characteristic grammatical features of Dravidian languages are:

- Dravidian languages are agglutinative.
- Word order is subject–object–verb (SOV).
- Most Dravidian languages have a clusivity distinction.
- The major word classes are nouns (substantives, numerals, pronouns), adjectives, verbs, and indeclinables (particles, enclitics, adverbs, interjections, onomatopoetic words, echo words).
- Proto-Dravidian used only suffixes, never prefixes or infixes, in the construction of inflected forms. Hence, the roots of words always occurred at the beginning. Nouns, verbs, and indeclinable words constituted the original word classes.
- There are two numbers and four different gender systems; see the section Number and gender for details.
- In a sentence, however complex, only one finite verb occurs, normally at the end, preceded if necessary by a number of gerunds.
- Word order follows certain basic rules but is relatively free.
- The main (and probably original) dichotomy in tense is past:non-past. Present tense developed later and independently in each language or subgroup.
- Verbs are intransitive, transitive, and causative; there are also active and passive forms.
- All of the positive verb forms have their corresponding negative counterparts, negative verbs.

=== Nominal morphology ===
==== Number and gender ====
The Dravidian languages have two numbers, singular and plural. The singular is unmarked, the plural is expressed by a suffix. The plural suffixes are -(n)k(k)a (cf. Kui kōḍi-ŋga 'cows', Brahui bā-k 'mouths'), *-ḷ (cf. Telugu mrānu-lu 'trees', Ollari ki-l 'hands') and the combination of these two *-(n)k(k)aḷ common in SD (cf. Tamil maraṅ-kaḷ 'trees', Kannada mara-gaḷu 'trees').

The individual Dravidian languages have different gender systems. What they have in common is that the grammatical gender (genus) always corresponds to the natural gender of the word. In addition to individual special developments, there are three main types in which the categories "male" or "non-male" as well as "human" and "non-human" play a central role:

1. The South Dravidian languages distinguish between masculine (human, masculine), feminine (human, non-masculine) and neuter (non-human) in the singular, and only between human and non-human in the plural.
2. The Central Dravidian and many South Central Dravidian languages distinguish only between masculine and non-masculine in both singular and plural.
3. Telugu and the North Dravidian languages distinguish between masculine and non-masculine in the singular, and between human and non-human in the plural.

The three types are illustrated by the forms of the third-person demonstrative pronouns of four languages:

Gender system types illustrated with third-person demonstrative pronouns
	m. Sg.	f. Sg.	n. Sg.	m. Pl.	f. Pl.	n. Pl.
Type 1: Kannada (South Dravidian)	avanu	avaḷu	adu	avaru		avu
Type 1: Tamil (South Dravidian) (Note: Tamil also has different forms for honorific pronouns: avar (human singular) and avarkaḷ (human plural).)	avaṉ	avaḷ	atu	avar		avai
Type 2: Kolami (Central Dravidian)	am	ad		avr	adav	
Type 3: Telugu (South Central Dravidian)	vāḍu	adi		vāru		avi
Type 3: Kurukh (North Dravidian) (Note: Kurukh honorific pronouns are distinguished by grammatical number: ār (human singular) and abṛar (human plural).)	ās	ād		ār		abṛā

There is no consensus as to which of these three types is the original.

The gender is not explicitly marked for all nouns. Thus in Telugu anna 'elder brother' is masculine and amma 'mother' non-masculine, without this being apparent from the pure form of the word. However, many nouns are formed with certain suffixes that express gender and number. For Proto-Dravidian, the suffixes *-nṯu could be used for the masculine singular (cf. Tamil kō-ṉ 'king', mak-aṉ 'son', Telugu mag-a(ṇ)ḍu 'male'), *-i and PSD1 *-aḷ for the singular feminine (cf. Kannada mag-aḷu 'daughter', Malto maq-i 'girl') and *-r for human plurals (cf. Tamil mak-ār 'sons', makaḷ-ir 'women', Kurukh āḷ-ar 'men').

==== Case ====
Case is expressed by suffixes and more loosely connected postpositions. The number of cases varies between four (Telugu) and eleven (Brahui).

The nominative is always the unmarked base form of the word. The other cases, collectively called oblique, are formed by adding suffixes to a stem that can either be identical to the nominative or formed by certain suffixes (e.g. Tamil maram 'tree', oblique mara-tt-). Several oblique suffixes can be reconstructed for Proto-Dravidian, which are composed of the minimal components *-i- , *-a- , *-n- and *-tt-. In many languages, the oblique is identical to the genitive.

Proto-Dravidian case suffixes can be reconstructed for the three cases accusative, dative and genitive. Other case suffixes only occur in individual branches of Dravidian.

- Accusative: *-ay (Tamil yāṉaiy-ai 'elephant', Malayalam avan-e 'him', Brahui dā shar-e 'this village'); *-Vn (Telugu bhārya-nu 'wife', Gondi kōndat-ūn 'ox', Ollari ḍurka-n 'panther')
- Dative: *-(n)k(k)- (Tamil uṅkaḷ-ukku 'you'; Telugu pani-ki 'for work', Kolami ella-ŋ 'to the house')
- Genitive: -*a/ā (Kannada avar-ā 'to be', Gondi kallē-n-ā 'of the thief', Brahui xarās-t-ā 'of the bull'); *-in (Tamil aracan-iṉ 'of the king', Toda ok-n 'of the elder sister', Ollari sēpal-in 'of the girl')

==== Pronouns ====
Personal pronouns occur in the first and second person. In the first person plural there are inclusive and exclusive forms, that is, a distinction is made as to whether the person addressed is included. There is also a reflexive pronoun that refers to the subject of the sentence and is constructed in the same way as personal pronouns.

Proto-Dravidian personal pronouns
	Nom.	Obl.	Meaning
1. Sg.	*yān	*yan	I
1. Pl. excl.	*yām	*yam	we (excl.)
1. Pl. incl.	*ñām	*ñam	we (incl.)
2. Sg.	*nīn	*nin	you
2. Pl	*nīm	*nim	you all
Refl. Sg.	*tān	*tan	(he/she/it) himself
Refl. Pl.	*tām	*tam	themselves

In addition, there are special developments in some languages: the South and South-Central Dravidian languages have transferred the *ñ initial sound of the 1st person plural inclusive to the 1st person singular (cf. Malayalam ñān, but oblique en < *yan). The differences between the forms for the inclusive and exclusive we are partly blurred; Kannada has completely abandoned this distinction. The languages of the Tamil-Kodagu group have formed a new exclusive 'we' by adding the plural suffix (cf. Tamil nām 'we (incl.)', nāṅ-kaḷ 'we (excl.)').

The demonstrative pronouns also serve as personal pronouns of the third person. They consist of an initial vowel expressing the distance and a suffix expressing number and gender. There are three levels of distance: the far distance is formed with the initial vowel *a-, the middle distance with *u- and the near distance with *i-. The same deictic elements also occur in local ('here', 'there') and temporal adverbs ('now', 'then'). The original threefold distinction of the distance (e.g. Kota avn 'he, that one', ūn 'he, this one', ivn 'he, this one') has only survived in a few languages spoken today, the yonder distance u- has mostly become obsolete instead a- and i- are used. Interrogative pronouns are formed analogously to the demonstrative pronouns and are characterised by the initial syllable *ya- (e.g. Kota evn 'which').

Tamil-Telugu made another word *ñān for the 1SG pronoun back formed from 1P inclusive *ñām, in parallel to *yān; some languages like Tamil retain both forms, yāṉ, nāṉ.

==== Verbal morphology ====
The Dravidian verb is formed by adding tense, mood and personal suffixes to the root of the word. Thus the Tamil word varukiṟēṉ 'I come' is composed of the verb stem varu-, the present suffix -kiṟ and the suffix of the 1st person singular -ēṉ.

In Proto-Dravidian there are only two tenses, past and not past, while many daughter languages have developed a more complex tense system.

The negation is expressed synthetically by a special negative verb form (cf. Konda kitan 'he made', kiʔetan 'he did not').

The verb stem can be modified by stem-forming suffixes in many Dravidian languages. Thus Malto derives from the stem nud- 'to hide' the reflexive verb stem nudɣr- 'to hide'.

Infinite verb forms depend on either a following verb or a following noun. They serve to form more complex syntactic constructions.

Verbal compounds can be formed in Dravidian, for example the Tamil konṭuvara 'to bring' is composed of an infinite form of the verb koḷḷa 'to hold' and the verb vara 'to come'.

==== Syntax ====
Characteristic of the Dravidian languages is a fixed subject–object–verb word order (SOV). Accordingly, the subject comes first in the sentence (it can at most be preceded by circumstantial determinations of time and place) and the predicate always at the end of the sentence. As is characteristic of SOV languages, in the Dravidian languages, attributes always come before their noun, subordinate clauses before main clauses, main verbs before auxiliary verbs, and postpositions are used instead of prepositions. Only in the North Dravidian languages has the rigid SOV word order been relaxed.

A simple sentence consists of a subject and a predicate, which can be either a verb or a noun. There is no copula in Dravidian. The subject is usually in the nominative case, but in many Dravidian languages, in a sentence expressing a feeling, perception or possession, the subject is also in the dative case. In all Dravidian languages except Malayalam, a verbal predicate agrees with a nominative subject. Kui and Kuwi developed a system of congruence between object and verb. In some Dravidian languages (Old Tamil, Gondi) even a nominal predicate takes personal endings. Examples of simple sentences from Tamil:

avar eṉṉaik kēṭṭār. (he me asked) 'He asked me.' (subject in nominative, verbal predicate)
avar eṉ appā. (he my father) 'He is my father.' (subject in nominative, nominal predicate)
avarukku kōpam vantatu. (to-him anger it-came) 'He became angry.' (subject in dative, verbal predicate)
avarukku oru makaṉ. (to-him a son) 'He has a son.' (subject in dative, nominal predicate)

Complex sentences consist of a main clause and one or more subordinate clauses. In general, a sentence can contain only one finite verb. The Dravidian languages have no conjunctions; subordinate clauses are formed just like parataxes by infinite verb forms. These include the infinitive, the verbal participle, which expresses a sequence of actions, and the conditional, which expresses a conditionality. Relative clauses correspond to constructions with the so-called adnominal participles. Examples from Tamil:

avarai varac col. (him to-come tell) 'Tell him to come.' (infinitive)
kaṭaikku pōyi muṭṭaikaḷ koṇṭuvā. (to-the-shop go-then eggs get-come) 'Go to the shop and bring eggs.' (verb participle)
avaṉ poy coṉṉāl ammā aṭippāḷ. (he lie if-saying mother will-beat) 'If he lies, mother will beat him.' (Conditional)
avaṉ coṉṉatu uṇmai. (he said truth) 'What he says is true.' (adnominal participle)

These constructions are not possible for subordinate clauses with a nominal predicate, since no infinite forms can be formed for a noun. Here one gets by with the so-called quotative verb (usually an infinite form of 'to say'), through which the nominal subordinate clause is embedded in the sentence structure. Example from Tamil:

nāṉ avaṉ nallavaṉ eṉṟu niṉaikkiṟēṉ. (I he [good-man]-like-that thinking) 'I think he's a good man.'

== Vocabulary ==
Word roots seem to have been monosyllabic in Proto-Dravidian as a rule. Proto-Dravidian words could be simple, derived, or compound. Iterative compounds could be formed by doubling a word, cf. Tamil avar "he" and avaravar "everyone" or vantu "coming" and vantu vantu "always coming". A special form of reduplicated compounds are the so-called echo words, in which the first syllable of the second word is replaced by ki, cf. Tamil pustakam "book" and pustakam-kistakam "books and the like".

Today's Dravidian languages have, in addition to the inherited Dravidian vocabulary, a large number of words from Sanskrit or later Indo-Aryan languages. In Tamil, they make up a relatively small proportion, not least because of targeted linguistic puristic tendencies in the early 20th century, while in Telugu, Kannada and Malayalam the number of Indo-Aryan loanwords is large. In Brahui, which was strongly influenced by its neighbouring languages due to its distance from the other Dravidian languages, only a tenth of the vocabulary is of Dravidian origin. [16] More recently, like all the languages of India, the Dravidian languages also have words borrowed from English on a large scale; less numerous are the loanwords from Portuguese.

Dravidian words that have found their way into English are "orange" (via Sanskrit nāraṅga, cf. Tamil nāraṅkа̄y < nāram-kа̄y), "catamaran" (Tamil kaṭṭumaram "[boat made of] bound logs"), "mango" (Tamil māṅkāy, Malayalam māṅṅa, via Portuguese manga), "mongoose" (Telugu muṅgisa, Kannada muṅgisi) and "curry" (Tamil kaṟi).

Some Dravidian word equations
Word	Fish	I	We (incl.)	We (excl.)	Under	Come	One
Proto-Dravidian	*mīn	*ēn ~ *yān	*nām ~ *ñām	*ēm ~ *yām	*kīẓ ~ kiẓ	*waru ~ wā	*onṯu, *oru, *on
Tamil	mīṉ	yāṉ, (nāṉ)	nām	yām, (nāṅkaḷ)	kīẓ	varu, vā-	oṉṟu, oru, ōr
Malayalam	mīn	ēṉ, (ñāṉ)	nām, (nammaḷ)	eṅṅaḷ, (ñaṅṅaḷ)	kīẓ, kiẓu	varu, vā-	onnŭ, oru, ōr
Irula		(nā(nu))			kiye	varu	ondu, or-
Kota	mīn	ān			kī, kīṛm	vār-, va-	oḏ,ōr, o
Toda	mīn	ōn			kī	pōr-, pa-	wïd, wïr, oš
Badaga	mīnu	(nā(nu))			kīe	bā-, bar	ondu
Kannada	mīn	(nānu)			kīẓ, keḷa	ba-, bāru-	ondu, or, ōr
Kodagu	mīnï	(nānï)			kï;, kïlï	bār-, ba-	ondï, orï, ōr, onï
Tulu	mīnɯ	yānu, yēnu	nama	yenkul	kīḷɯ	barpini	oñji, or, oru
Telugu	mīnu	*ēn, ēnu, (nēnu)	*nām ~ (manamu)	*ēm, ēmu, (mēmu)	kri, k(r)inda	vaccu, rā-	oṇḍu
Gondi	mīn	anā, (nanna)				vaya	undi, or-
Konda	mīn	(nān(u))				vā-, ra-	unṟi, or-
Kui	mīnu	ānu, (nānu)				vāva	ro-
Kuwi	mīnu	(nānu)				vā-	ro-
Manda		ān				vā-	ru-
Pengo	mīn	ān, āneŋ				vā-	ro-
Kolami		ān				var-, vā	
Parji	mīni	ān			kiṛi	ver-	
Gadaba	mīn	ān				var-	
Malto	mīnu	ēn	nām	ēm		bare	ort-, -ond
Kurukh	mīnz, mīnjō	ēn	nām	ēm	kiyyā	bā-, bar-	ond, oṇḍ, ort-, on
Brahui		ī			ki-, kē-	bar-, ba-	asi(ṭ), on-

- Tamil-Telugu made another word *ñān for the 1SG pronoun back formed from 1P inclusive *ñām, in parallel to *yān; some languages like Tamil retain both forms, yāṉ, nāṉ.

=== Numerals ===
The numerals from 1 to 10 in various Dravidian and Indo-Iranian languages (here exemplified by Indo-Aryan language Sanskrit and Iranian language Persian).

Number	South							South-Central		Central	Northern		Proto-Dravidian	Indo-Aryan	Iranian
Number	Tamil	Malayalam	Kodava	Kannada	Tulu	Toda	Beary	Telugu	Gondi	Kolami	Kurukh	Brahui	Proto-Dravidian	Sanskrit	Persian
1	oṉṟŭ, oṉṉŭ ^{6}, oṇṇŭ ^{6}	onnŭ	ondï	ondu	onji	wïd̠	onnu	okaṭi ^{7}, oṇḍu	undi	okkod ^{7}	*oṉḏ	asiṭ	*onṯu ^{1}	éka	yek
2	iraṇṭŭ, reṇḍŭ ^{6}	raṇḍŭ	daṇḍï	eraḍu	eraḍŭ, iraḍŭ	ēḍ	jend	reṇḍu	raṇḍ	irāṭ	*ireṇḍ	irāṭ	*iraṇṭu ^{2}	dvi	do
3	mūṉṟŭ, mūṇŭ ^{6}	mūnnŭ	mūndï	mūru	mūji	mūd̠	mūnnu	mū̃ḍu	muṇḍ	mūndiŋ	*mūṉḏ	musiṭ	*mūnt̠u	tri	seh
4	nāl, nālku, nāṉkŭ, nālŭ ^{6}	nālu	nālï	nālku	nālŭ	nōng	nāl	nālugu	nāluṅg	nāliŋ	*nālx	čār (II)	*nāl, *nālnk(k)V, *nānk(k)V	catúr	cahār
5	aintŭ, añjŭ ^{6}	añjŭ	añji	aidu	ayinŭ, ainŭ	üɀ	añji	ayidu, ēnu	saiyuṅg, hayuṅ	ayd ^{3}	*xaiṉḏ	panč (II)	*caymtu	pañca	panj
6	āṟŭ	āṟŭ	ārï	āru	āji	ōr̠	ār	āṟu	sāruṅg, hāruṅg	ār ^{3}	*cāṉḏ	šaš (II)	*cāṯu	ṣáṣ	śeś
7	ēḻŭ, yēḷŭ^{6}	ēḻŭ	ë̄ḷï	ēḷu	ēḍŭ, ēlŭ, ēḷŭ	öw	ēl	ēḍu	yeḍuṅg, ēṛuṅg	ēḍ ^{3}	*ēyy	haft (II)	*ēẓ	saptá	haft
8	eṭṭŭ	eṭṭŭ	ëṭṭï	eṇṭu	enma, eṇma, eḍma	öṭ	ett	enimidi	aṛmur	enumadī ^{3}	*eṇṭ	hašt (II)	*eṇṭṭu	aṣṭá	haśt
9	oṉpatŭ ^{4} ^{5} ombadŭ^{6}	oṉbadŭ, ombadŭ ^{5}	ombay ^{5}	ombattu ^{5}	ormba ^{5}	wïnboθ ^{5}	olimbō ^{5}	tommidi	unmāk	tomdī ^{3}	*toṇṭ	nōh (II)	*toḷ, *toṇ	náva	noh
10	pattŭ	pattŭ	pattï	hattu	pattŭ	pot	patt	padi	pad	padī ^{3}	*paḏ	dah (II)	*paHtu	dáśa	dah

1. This is the same as the word for another form of the number one in Tamil and Malayalam, used as the indefinite article ("a") and when the number is an attribute preceding a noun (as in "one person"), as opposed to when it is a noun (as in "How many are there?" "One").
2. The stem *īr is still found in compound words, and has taken on a meaning of "double" in Tamil, Telugu, Kannada and Malayalam. For example, irupatu (20, literally meaning "double-ten" in Malayalam & Tamil), iravai (20 in Telugu), "iraṭṭi" ("double", in Tamil) or iruvar ("two people", in Tamil) and "ippattu" (ipp-hattu, double ten", in Kannada).
3. The Kolami numbers 5 to 10 are borrowed from Telugu.
4. The word toṇṭu was also used to refer to the number nine in ancient Sangam texts but was later completely replaced by the word oṉpatu.
5. These forms are derived from "one (less than) ten". Proto-Dravidian *toḷ/*toṇ (which could mean 9 or 9/10) is still used in Tamil and Malayalam as the basis of numbers such as 90 and 900, toṇṇūṟu (9/10*100 = 90) as well as the Kannada tombattu (9*10 = 90).
6. Because of shared sound changes that have happened over the years in the majority of the Tamil dialects, the numbers 1–5 have different colloquial pronunciations, seen here to the right of their written, formal pronunciations.
7. In languages with words for one starts with ok(k)- it was taken from *okk- which originally meant "to be united" and not a numeral.
- Words indicated (II) are borrowings from Indo-Iranian languages (in Brahui's case, from Balochi).

== Literature ==
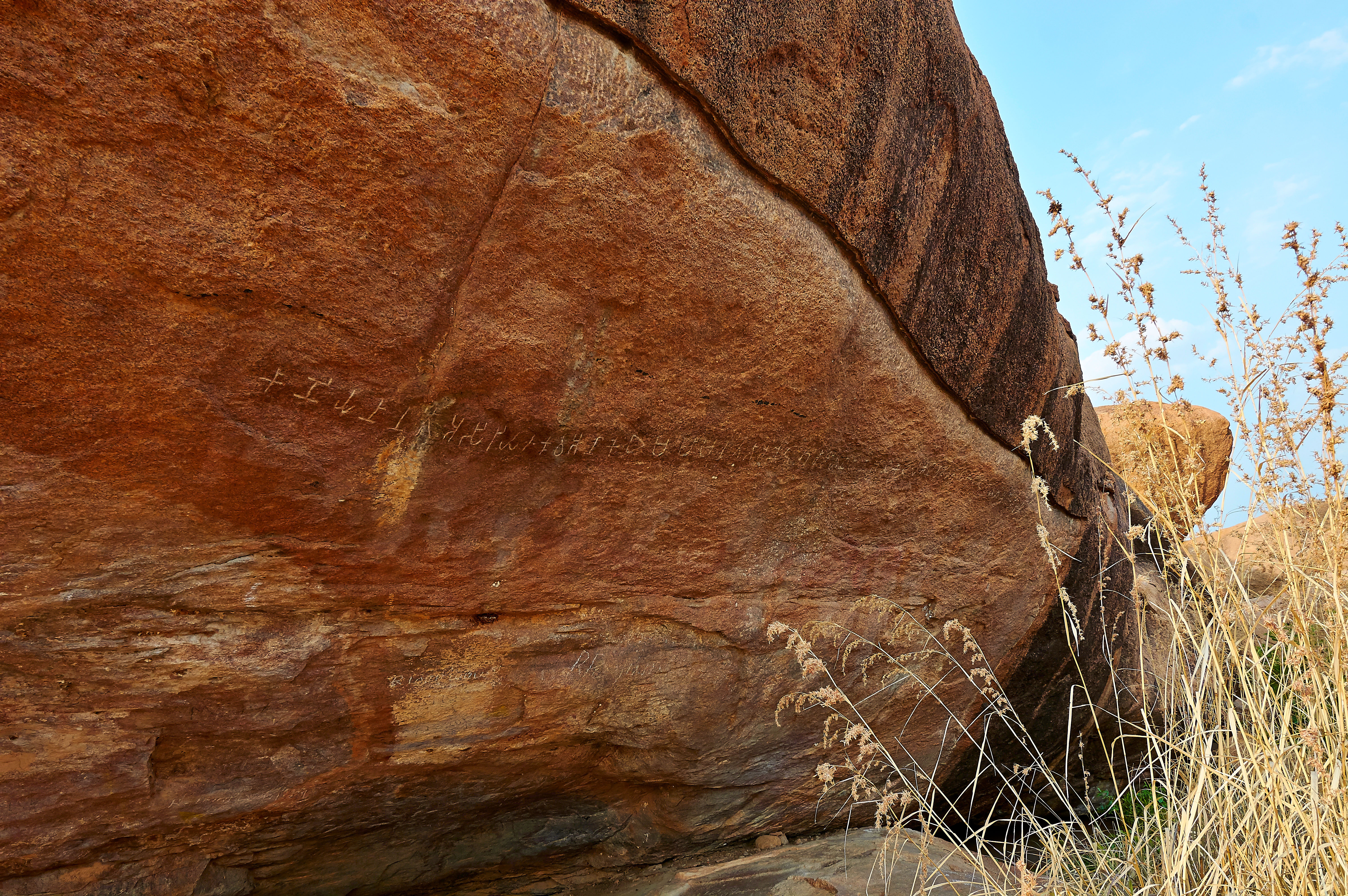
The oldest known Tamil-Brahmi inscription, near Mangulam in Madurai district

Four Dravidian languages, viz. Tamil, Kannada, Telugu and Malayalam, have lengthy literary traditions. Literature in Tulu and Kodava is more recent. Historical literature in Gondi has also been discovered recently.

The earliest known Dravidian inscriptions are 76 Old Tamil inscriptions on cave walls in Madurai and Tirunelveli districts in Tamil Nadu, dating from the 2nd century BCE. These inscriptions are written in a variant of the Brahmi script called Tamil Brahmi. In 2019, the Tamil Nadu Archaeology Department released a report on excavations at Keeladi, near Madurai, Tamil Nadu, including a description of potsherds dated to the 6th century BCE inscribed with personal names in the Tamil-Brahmi script. However, the report lacks the detail of a full archaeological study, and other archaeologists have disputed whether the oldest dates obtained for the site can be assigned to these potsherds. The earliest long text in Old Tamil is the Tolkāppiyam, a work on Tamil grammar and poetics preserved in a 5th-century CE redaction, whose oldest layers could date from the late 2nd century or 1st century BCE.

Kannada's earliest known inscription is the lion balustrade (Simhakatanjana) inscription excavated at the Pranaveshwara temple complex at Talagunda near Shiralakoppa of Shivamogga district, dated to 370 CE which replaced the Halmidi inscription in Hassan district (450 CE). A 9th-century treatise on poetics, the Kavirajamarga, is the first known literary work. The earliest Telugu inscription, from Erragudipadu in Kadapa district, is dated to 575 CE. The first literary work is an 11th-century translation of part of the Mahābhārata. The earliest Malayalam text is the Vazhappally copper plate (9th century). The first literary work is Rāmacaritam (12th century).

== See also ==
- Dravidian Linguistics Association
- Dravidian peoples
- Dravidian nationalism
- Tamil loanwords in Biblical Hebrew
- Dreaming of Words

== Bibliography ==
- Andronov, Mikhail Sergeevich (2003), A Comparative Grammar of the Dravidian Languages, Otto Harrassowitz, ISBN 978-3-447-04455-4.
- Avari, Burjor (2007), Ancient India: A History of the Indian Sub-Continent from C. 7000 BC to AD 1200, Routledge, ISBN 978-1-134-25162-9.
- Caldwell, Robert (1856), A comparative grammar of the Dravidian, or, South-Indian family of languages, London: Harrison, OCLC 20216805; Reprinted London, K. Paul, Trench, Trubner & co., ltd., 1913; rev. ed. by J.L. Wyatt and T. Ramakrishna Pillai, Madras, University of Madras, 1961, reprint Asian Educational Services, 1998, ISBN 81-206-0117-3.
- Campbell, Lyle; Poser, William J. (2008), Language Classification: History and Method, Cambridge University Press, ISBN 978-0-521-88005-3.
- Cavalli-Sforza, Luigi Luca; Menozzi, Paolo; Piazza, Alberto (1994), The History and Geography of Human Genes, Princeton University Press, ISBN 978-0-691-18726-6.
- Cavalli-Sforza, Luigi Luca (2000), Genes, Peoples, and Languages, North Point Press, ISBN 978-0-86547-529-8.
- Ellis, Francis Whyte (1816), "Note to the Introduction", A grammar of the Teloogoo language, commonly termed the Gentoo, peculiar to the Hindoos inhabiting the northeastern provinces of the Indian peninsula, by Campbell, A. D., Madras: College Press, OCLC 416559272.
- Elst, Koenraad (1999), Update on the Aryan Invasion Debate, New Delhi: Aditya Prakashan, ISBN 81-86471-77-4.
- Erdosy, George, ed. (1995), The Indo-Aryans of Ancient South Asia: Language, Material Culture and Ethnicity, Berlin/New York: Walter de Gruyter, ISBN 3-11-014447-6.
- Heras, Henry (1953). Studies in Proto-Indo-Mediterranean Culture. Bombay: Indian Historical Research Institute. OCLC 2799353.
- Knorozov, Yuri V. (1965). "Характеристика протоиндийского языка" [Characteristics of Proto-Indian language]. Predvaritel'noe soobshchenie ob issledovanii protoindiyskikh textov Предварительное сообщение об исследовании протоиндийских текстов [A Preliminary Report on the Study of Proto Texts] (in Russian). Moscow: Institute of Ethnography of the USSR.
- Kolichala, Suresh (2016). "Dravidian Languages". In Hans Henrich Hock; Elena Bashir (eds.). The Languages and Linguistics of South Asia: A Comprehensive Guide. Berlin/Boston: De Gruyter Mouton. pp. 73–107. ISBN 978-3-11-042715-8.
- Krishnamurti, Bhadriraju (2003), The Dravidian Languages, Cambridge University Press, ISBN 0-521-77111-0.
- Kuiper, F.B.J. (1991), Aryans in the Rig Veda, Rodopi, ISBN 90-5183-307-5.
- Mahadevan, Iravatham (2003), Early Tamil Epigraphy, Harvard University Press, ISBN 978-0-674-01227-1.
- Mallory, J. P. (1989), In Search of the Indo-Europeans: Language, Archaeology and Myth, London: Thames and Hudson, ISBN 978-0-500-05052-1.
- Narasimhan, Vagheesh M.; Patterson, Nick; Moorjani, Priya; Rohland, Nadin; et al. (2019), "The Formation of Human Populations in South and Central Asia", Science, 365 (6457) eaat7487, Bibcode:2019Sci...365t7487N, doi:10.1126/science.aat7487, PMC 6822619, PMID 31488661.
- Parpola, Asko (1994). Deciphering the Indus script. New York: Cambridge University Press. ISBN 978-0-521-43079-1.
- Parpola, Asko (2010), A Dravidian solution to the Indus script problem (PDF), World Classical Tamil Conference, archived from the original (PDF) on 2 August 2020.
- Reich, David; Thangaraj, Kumarasamy; Patterson, Nick; Price, Alkes L.; Singh, Lalji (2009), "Reconstructing Indian Population History", Nature, 461 (7263): 489–494, Bibcode:2009Natur.461..489R, doi:10.1038/nature08365, PMC 2842210, PMID 19779445.
- Ruhlen, Merritt (1991), A Guide to the World's Languages: Classification, Stanford University Press, ISBN 978-0-8047-1894-3.
- Shulman, David (2016), Tamil, Harvard University Press, ISBN 978-0-674-05992-4.
- Southworth, Franklin C. (2005), Linguistic Archaeology of South Asia, RoutledgeCurzon, ISBN 978-1-134-31777-6.
- ——— (2009), Proto-Dravidian Agriculture (PDF).
- ——— (2011), "Rice in Dravidian", Rice, 4 (3–4): 142–148, Bibcode:2011Rice....4..142S, doi:10.1007/s12284-011-9076-9.
- Sreekumar, P. (2009), "Francis Whyte Ellis and the Beginning of Comparative Dravidian Linguistics", Historiographia Linguistica, 36 (1): 75–95, doi:10.1075/hl.36.1.04sre.
- Steever, Sanford B. (2020), "Introduction to the Dravidian Languages", in Steever, Sanford B. (ed.), The Dravidian Languages (2nd ed.), Routledge, pp. 1–44, ISBN 978-1-138-85376-8.
- Subrahmanyam, P. S. (1983), Dravidian Comparative Phonology, Annamalai University.
- Thomason, Sarah Grey; Kaufman, Terrence (1991), Language Contact, Creolization, and Genetic Linguistics, University of California Press, ISBN 0-520-07893-4.
- Trask, Robert Lawrence (2000), The Dictionary of Historical and Comparative Linguistics, Routledge, ISBN 1-57958-218-4.
- Witzel, Michael (1999), "Early Sources for South Asian Substrate Languages" (PDF), Mother Tongue (extra number): 1–76, archived (PDF) from the original on 3 March 2016.
- Zvelebil, Kamil (1973), The Smile of Murugan: On Tamil Literature of South India, BRILL, ISBN 90-04-03591-5.
- ——— (1975), Tamil Literature, Leiden: Brill, ISBN 90-04-04190-7.
- ——— (1990), Dravidian Linguistics: An Introduction, Pondicherry Institute of Linguistics and Culture, ISBN 978-81-8545-201-2.
