= Kolami =

Central Dravidian language of India

- Kolāmi
- कॊलामि, కొలామి
- Native to: India
- Region: Maharashtra, Telangana, Madhya Pradesh
- Ethnicity: 239,583 Kolam (2011 census)
- Native speakers: 128,451, 54% of ethnic population (2011 census)
- Language family: Dravidian: Central; Kolami–Naiki; Kolami
- Writing system: Devanagari; Telugu script; Goykanadi

Language codes
- ISO 639-3: Either: kfb – Northwestern Kolami nit – Southeastern Kolami (Naiki)
- Glottolog: nort2699

- Person: Kolavand, kolavak
- People: Kolavader, kolavaker
- Language: Kolāmi
- Country: Maharashtram, India

Kolami (IPA: [kolaːmi], Northwestern Kolami/Southeastern Kolami) is a tribal Central Dravidian language spoken in Maharashtra and Telangana states of India. It falls under the Kolami–Naiki group of languages. It is the most widely spoken Central Dravidian language.

== Classification ==
Kolami language has been classified as a Central Dravidian language. It is well known as a Dravidian language of Maharashtra state. Well influenced by South Central Dravidian languages like Telugu and Gondi, it is also a tribal Dravidian language. Kolami is the dialect of the Kolam tribal group.

The Kolami dialect differs considerably from the Gond language of the neighboring district. In some respects, Kolami is closely related to Telugu and in others to Kannada. The influence of the Bhilli language is felt as the communication in the surrounding area comes into contact. Some other points of similarity are also important like the Toda dialect of the Nilgiris and according to Dr. Grierson, linguistically speaking, the Kolami may be the remaining descendants of the Dravidian tribes, who either never participated in the development of the main Dravidian language or who never adopted Dravidian language.

== Writing systems ==
Kolami language is written using Devanagari, and Telugu scripts for writing purposes.

== Numbers ==
Modern Devanagari script	Kolami numeral	Kolami word and transliteration
०	0	शून्यम् (Śūnyam)
१	1	ऒक्कॊद् (okkod)
२	2	इन्दिङ् (indiṅ)
३	3	मून्दिङ् (mūndiṅ)
४	4	नालिङ् (nāliṅ)
५	5	सेन्दि (sēndi)
६	6	साऱि (sāṟi)
७	7	एऴ् (ēẓ)
८	8	ऎंदि (eṁdi)
९	9	तॊंदि (toṁdi)
१०	10	पदि (padi)
२०	20	इरवै (iravai)
१००	100	नूऱ् (nūṟ)
१०००	1000	सहस्रम् (Sahasram)

== Verbs ==
=== Present tense ===
	Present tense	Present tense negative
1st person singular आन् ān	वद्दुन् vaddun I am coming	वरॆन् varen I am not going

== Characteristics ==
Kolami has a two-gender system, being either masculine or non-masculine. Kolami has developed aspirated stops, distancing itself from its ancestor Proto-Dravidian.

== Phonology ==
Vowels
	Front		Central		Back	
	short	long	short	long	short	long
High	i	iː			u	uː
Mid	e	eː			o	oː
Low			a	aː		

Consonants
		Labial	Dental/ Alveolar	Retroflex	Palatal	Velar	Glottal
Nasal		m	n	ɳ		ŋ	
Plosive	voiceless	p	t	ʈ	t͡ʃ	k	
Plosive	voiced	b	d	ɖ	d͡ʒ	ɡ	
Fricative	voiceless		s				h
Fricative	voiced		z				
Approximant	median	ʋ			j		
Approximant	lateral		l	ɭ			
Rhotic			r				

== Sample Text ==
The given sample text is Article 1 from the United Nations Universal Declaration of Human Rights.

=== English ===
All human beings are born free and equal in dignity and rights. They are endowed with reason and conscience and should act towards one another in a spirit of brotherhood.

=== Kolami ===
ऎल् मन्ककॆर् स्वातन्त्र्यमड् पुट्टॆन्दन् वन्नॆर्. मरि समानं मरि अधिकारङ्कुळन् समानम् अण्डर्. अवर् तर्कङ्कुळ् मरि विवेकंलड् सम्पन्नं मरि ऒक्कॊरिक्कॊवॆण्ट बन्धूत्वंलॆ भावनालड् आडन् पाजे।

ఎల్ మన్కకెర్ స్వాతంత్ర్యమనడ్ పుట్టెందన్ వన్నెర్. మరి సమానం మరి అధికారంకుళన్ సమానం అండర్. అవర్ తర్కంకుళ్ మరి వివేకంలడ్ సంపన్నం మరి ఒక్కొరిక్కొవెంట బంధూత్వంలె భావనాలడ్ ఆడన్ పాజే.

=== Romanisation ===
El mankaker svātantryamaḍ puṭṭendan vanner. Iṇi samānam iṇi adhikāraṅkuḷan samānam aṇḍar. Avar tarkaṅkuḷ iṇi vivēkanlaḍ sampannam iṇi okkorikkoveṇṭa bandhutvamle bhāvanālaḍ āḍan pājē.

Phrases	English Translation	Dēvanāgarī	Telugu
Inne pidir tāned ?	What is your name ?	इन्नॆ पिदिर् तानॆद् ?	ఇన్నె పిదిర్ తానెద్ ?
Anne pidir rāmak	My name is rāmand	अन्नॆ पिदिर् रामन्द्	అన్నె పిదిర్ రామన్ద్
Rāmak, avar devar	Rāmak, they are god	रामक्, अवर् देवक्	రామక్,అపర్ దేవక్
Āy	Yes	आय्	ఆయ్
Tōted, Sillai	No	तोतॆद्, सिल्लै	తోతెద్, సిల్లై
var itti	Come (singular) here	वर् इत्ति	వర్ ఇత్తి
varrur	come (plural)	वर्रुर्	వర్రుర్
Etti ini enaṅ	where and how	ऎत्ति इनि ऎनङ्	ఎత్తి ఇవి ఎనఙ్

Also see Kolami Swadesh list on wiktionary.
