= Naiki language =

Dravidian language spoken in India

Naiki
- Southeastern Kolami
- కొలామి
- Native to: India
- Native speakers: (10,000 cited 1989); 1,500 speakers (2007)
- Language family: Dravidian: Central Dravidian; Kolami–Naiki; Naiki
- Dialects: Chanda; Naikṛi
- Writing system: Devanagari, Telugu script

Language codes
- ISO 639-3: nit
- Glottolog: sout1549
- ELP: Southeastern Kolami

Naiki (IPA: [naːjki]), or Southeastern Kolami, is a tribal Central Dravidian language used in Maharashtra state of India. Dialects are Naiki proper, or Chanda, and Naikṛi (Krishnamurti 2003:57)

== Phonology ==
=== Vowels ===
Vowels
	Front		Central		Back	
	short	long	short	long	short	long
High	i	iː			u	uː
Mid	e	eː			o	oː
Low			a	aː		

=== Consonants ===
Consonants
			Labial	Alveolar	Retroflex	Palatal	Velar	Glottal
Nasal			m	n			ŋ	
Plosive/ Affricate	voiceless	plain	p	t, ts	ʈ	tʃ	k	
Plosive/ Affricate	voiceless	aspirated	pʰ	tʰ	ʈʰ	tʃʰ	kʰ	
Plosive/ Affricate	voiced	plain	b	d, dz	ɖ	dʒ	ɡ	
Plosive/ Affricate	voiced	aspirated	bʱ	dʱ	ɖʱ	dʒʱ	ɡʱ	
Fricative			v	s				h
Rhotic				r				
Approximant				l	ɭ	j		
