= Kalanadi language =

Southern Dravidian language of India

Kalanadi
- Native to: India
- Native speakers: 750 (2004 survey)
- Language family: Dravidian: Southern; Southern I; Tamil–Kannada; Tamil–Kota; Tamil–Toda; Tamil–Irula; Tamil–Kodava–Urali; Tamil–Malayalam; Malayalamoid; Kalanadi–Kunduvadi–Pathiya; Kalanadi
- Early forms: Old Tamil: Middle Tamil

Language codes
- ISO 639-3: wkl
- Glottolog: kala1255

Kalanadi (IPA: [kɐlɐnaɖi]) is a Southern Dravidian language of India. It is most similar to Pathiya with which it shares 88% lexical similarity.
