= Thomas Burrow =

British Indologist (1909–1986)

Thomas Burrow (/ˈbʌroʊ/; 29 June 1909 – 8 June 1986) was an Indologist and the Boden Professor of Sanskrit at the University of Oxford from 1944 to 1976; he was also a fellow of Balliol College, Oxford during this time. His work includes A Dravidian Etymological Dictionary, The Problem of Shwa in Sanskrit and The Sanskrit Language.

== Early life ==
Burrow was born in Leck in North Lancashire, and was the eldest of the six children of Joshua and Frances Eleanor Burrow. He attended Queen Elizabeth's Grammar School, Kirkby Lonsdale, and won a scholarship to Christ's College, Cambridge. Here he became interested in Sanskrit as a result of specialising in comparative philology.

== Professional life ==
Burrow is best known for his thirty-two year tenure as Boden Professor of Sanskrit at the Oriental Institute of the University of Oxford (1944–1976). During this time he conducted research and taught several generations of Sanskrit students. His professional colleagues during this time included especially Richard Gombrich, Lecturer in Sanskrit from 1965, who would succeed him in the Boden Chair.

During the War years, 1937–1944, before his appointment at Oxford, Burrow was Assistant Keeper at the British Museum, and also held an appointment at SOAS from 1938 to 1948. In these years he especially worked on the grammar and literature of the Niya Prakrit documents from Central Asia preserved in the Kharoṣṭhī script.

Also during the War, Burrow developed a deep interest in Dravidian languages and linguistics, and during fieldwork in South India in the 1950s and 1960s, he documented two languages previously unknown to scholarship (Parji and Pengo). He tackled the problem of identifying Dravidian loanwords in Sanskrit while at Annamalai University under P. S. Subrahmanya Sastri and published the Collected papers on Dravidian linguistics in 1968. With his American colleague Murray B. Emeneau, Burrow published a milestone study, A Dravidian Etymological Dictionary (1966). After Burrow retired, his focus for the last years of his life was to produce an expanded second edition of this work, which he achieved in 1984.

The above accounts are based on the informative obituary of Burrow published in 1987.

== Personal life ==
In 1941, Burrow married Inez Mary Haley, who died in 1976. There were no children of the marriage. An intensely private man, Burrow was rumoured to be excellent at darts and to enjoy draft beers at his local pub in Kidlington.

== Principal publications ==
- A Translation of the Kharoṣṭhī Documents from Chinese Turkestan. James G. Forlong Fund, vol. XX. London: The Royal Asiatic Society, 1940.
- The Sanskrit language. Faber and Faber. 1955. ISBN 9788120817678. (3rd edition, 1973; reprint Motilal Banarsidass Publ., Delhi 2001)
- A comparative vocabulary of the Gondi dialects, Asiatic Society (1960)
- with M. B. Emeneau, A Dravidian Etymological Dictionary, Clarendon Press (1966)
  - A Dravidian Etymological Dictionary: Supplement, Clarendon Press (1968)
- Collected Papers on Dravidian Linguistics. Annamalai University. 1968.
