= Pathiya language =

Southern Dravidian language of India

Pathiya
- Native to: India
- Native speakers: 1,000 (2004)
- Language family: Dravidian: Southern; Southern I; Tamil–Kannada; Tamil–Kota; Tamil–Toda; Tamil–Irula; Tamil–Kodava–Urali; Tamil–Malayalam; Malayalamoid; Kalanadi–Kunduvadi–Pathiya; Pathiya
- Early forms: Old Tamil: Middle Tamil

Language codes
- ISO 639-3: pty
- Glottolog: path1235

Pathiya (IPA: [pɐd̪ijɐ]) is a Southern Dravidian language of India. It is close to Kalanadi.
