= Kumbar =

Kumbar (Urdu: کُمبڑ, also spelt Kumber) is a settlement in Lal Qilla Tehsil, Lower Dir District, in the province of Khyber Pakhtunkhwa, Pakistan. It had a population of 5,773 in 2017.
