= Manda language (India) =

Dravidian language of Odisha, India

Manda
- Native to: India
- Region: Orissa
- Native speakers: (4,000 cited 2000)
- Language family: Dravidian: South-Central; Konda–Kui; Manda–Pengo; Manda

Language codes
- ISO 639-3: mha
- Glottolog: mand1413
- ELP: Manda (India)
- Manda is classified as Critically Endangered by the UNESCO Atlas of the World's Languages in Danger

Manda (IPA: [maːɳɖɐ]) is a Dravidian language of Odisha, spoken in the highlands of Thuamul Rampur block of Kalahandi district. It only became known to Western academia in 1964. Its speakers are generally known as 'Khond Parjas' by outsiders but self-identify as Manda Khonds. In the late 1970s and early 1980s, the language was spoken in around 60 villages and the total number of speakers was estimated to be at 4000-5000. However the language is facing endangerment from Odia, which all speakers are bilingual in.

A dictionary of Manda was published in 2009.

== Vocabulary ==
The following is a sample vocabulary:

- aku (plural: akux) - grandfather
- aḍra (plural: aḍraŋ) - cattle
- igaro - eleven
- uṭ - to feed liquid
- ugeri (plural: ugeriŋ) - cooked rice
- kat - to cut
- kaṭ - to chew
- ta:ŋg - to walk
- beḍe - big
- vendu:l (plural: vendu:liŋ) - tongue
