= P. S. Subrahmanyam =

Linguist and Dravidologist (1939–2016)

P. S. Subramanyam
- Born: 1939; Andhra Pradesh, India
- Died: 17 March 2016 (aged 76); Hyderabad, India

Academic background
- Education: Andhra University

Academic work
- Discipline: Linguistics
- Sub-discipline: Dravidian languages
- Institutions: Annamalai University

Prakya Sreesaila Subrahmanyam (20 April 1939 – 17 March 2016) was an Indian linguist primarily known for his work on the comparative and historical linguistics of the Dravidian languages. He also wrote about the Sanskrit grammatical tradition (vyākaraṇa). He was a professor at Annamalai University.

== Bibliography ==
- 1987. The non-literary languages and their contribution to Dravidian comparative grammar.
- 1991. Tense formation in Kota-Toda: a comparative study. I
- 1993. The personal pronouns in Dravidian.
- 1994 The translation of Mahabharata into Telugu: some observations.
