= Vatalia Prajapati =

Hindu caste found only in Gujarat

Vatalia or Vataliya Prajapati are an endogamous Hindu group and a sub-caste of Prajapati found only in the Indian state of Gujarat.

Vatalia are said to be off-springs of a Brahmin father by a Kumbhar wife and as such are polluted Brahmins In the eighth century AD, who are now considered a part of Prajapati community, as they do business. Their kuladevata are said to be Lord Hanuman.

Vatalia along with other Prajapati sub-divisions like Sorathia, Gujjar, Parjiya are included in SEBC communities of Gujarat.

Among their associations with other Kumbhar castes - they eat together with Gujjar and Koria Kumbhars but do not inter-marry. However, they would neither eat nor intermarry with Maru and Khambhati Kumbhars of Saurashtra.

Their population is mostly found in Saurashtra in cities of Ahmedabad, Surat, Bhavnagar, Vadodara and Amroli, Savarkundla, Rajula, Talaja, Khambha, Katargam regions. Outside Gujarat, there is notable population of community in Mumbai.

In Talaja, they are known as Tarahariya after the Tarahara village founded by Vatalia community, where the community members from other area still comes to pay homage to their Kulladevata temple of Hanuman.

The community was subject of medical study with respect to G6PD deficiency and medical research in 2005, which concluded that Vataliya Prajapatis have high incidence of G6PD deficiency without severe chronic hemolytic anemia

The community publishes their own community periodical since 1958, which is circulated amongst the All India Vataliya Prjapati Community Association.
