= Pengo language =

Dravidian language spoken in India

Pengo
- ପେଙ୍ଗୋ
- Region: India
- Native speakers: 1,300 (2003)
- Language family: Dravidian: South-Central; Konda–Kui; Manda–Pengo; Pengo

Language codes
- ISO 639-3: peg
- Glottolog: peng1244

Pengo (IPA: [peŋɡo]) is a South-Central Dravidian language spoken in Nabarangpur district of Odisha by the Pengo Poraja people. Most speakers are fluent in Odia.

== Phonology ==
Vowels
| | Front | | Central | | Back | |
| | short | long | short | long | short | long |
|---|---|---|---|---|---|---|
| High | i | iː | | | u | uː |
| Mid | e | eː | | | o | oː |
| Low | | | a | aː | | |

Consonants
| | | Labial | Dental | Retroflex | Palatal | Velar | Glottal |
|---|---|---|---|---|---|---|---|
| Nasal | | m | n | ɳ | | ŋ | |
| Plosive | voiceless | p | t | ʈ | c | k | |
| Plosive | voiced | b | d | ɖ | ɟ | ɡ | |
| Fricative | voiceless | | s | | | | h |
| Fricative | voiced | | z | | | | |
| Approximant | median | ʋ | | | j | | |
| Approximant | lateral | | l | | | | |
| Tap | | | ɾ | ɽ | | | |
