= Polygamy in India =

Polygamy in India may refer to:

- Polygyny in India
- Polyandry in India
