= Progressivism in Bangladesh =

Political ideology and reform movement in Bangladesh

Progressivism (Bengali: প্রগতিশীলতাবাদ, romanized: prôgôtiśīlôtābād) is mainly championed by left-wing parties in Bangladesh. Rooted in the struggle for independence of Bangladesh, progressivism in Bangladesh today centers around social justice, secular nationalism, institutional reform, transparent governance, judicial independence, and minority and women's rights.

== History ==
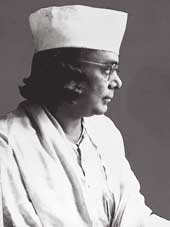
Kazi Nazrul Islam, the national poet of Bangladesh, held progressive Muslim outlook

The roots of progressivism in Bengal can be traced back to the Bengal Renaissance in 19th century. Aligarh movement, initiated by Syed Ahmed Khan, helped bring social reforms amongst Bengali Muslims. Begum Rokeya helped spread feminist idea of gender equality and female empowerment in Bengali Muslim society.

Roots of modern progressivism in Bangladesh lies in the independence movement of Bangladesh. Progressive intellectuals and politicians played pivotal role in the Bengali self-determination movement in East Pakistan. Leftist and progressive ideals helped fuel the Bengali language movement and the Liberation War. Early communist and socialist organizers united diverse groups across class lines to fight for Bengali autonomy. Progressive intellectuals were targeted by the Pakistani Forces during the Bangladesh genocide.

Following the independence, left-leaning radical faction of the Chhatra League split and formed Jatiya Samajtantrik Dal in 1972. However, reactionary factions soon emerged within party, making it to take an militant turn. After a brief period of domination, the influence of progressive parties declined after the assassination of Sheikh Mujibur Rahman due to the rise of conservative politics. Remaining progressive politicians joined or allied with mainstream political parties like Bangladesh Nationalist Party or Jatiya Party.

After a long period of stagnation, 2013 Shahbag protests helped to revive the progressive movement in Bangladesh. In its aftermath, however, religious conservatives, led by Hefazat-e-Islam clashed with the progressives during the 2013 Shapla Square protests, which was suppressed by then Awami League government. Progressive movement in Bangladesh has suffered from accusations of pro-government bias during Awami League rule, which other progressives have dismissed as "pseudo-liberalism". Other commentators have noted internal division and failure to form greater unity with non-proggressive forces. Overall, leftist parties have since suffered a decline in competitive politics in the country. This continued after the July uprising, where many progressive groups spontaneously joined the protests, but could not came out as a significant force due to long-standing theoretical and organisational weakness.

== List of Bangladeshi progressives ==
- Kazi Nazrul Islam
- Begum Rokeya
- Zahir Raihan
- Shahidullah Kaiser
- Mashiur Rahman Jadu Mia
- Kazi Zafar Ahmed
- Suranjit Sengupta
- Nuh-ul-Alam Lenin
- Mujahidul Islam Selim
- Mirza Fakhrul Islam Alamgir
- Zonayed Saki

== See also ==
- Socialism in Bangladesh
- Anarchism in Bangladesh
- Feminism in Bangladesh
- Liberalism in Bangladesh
