= Polyandry =

Mating system in which the female partner may have multiple partners

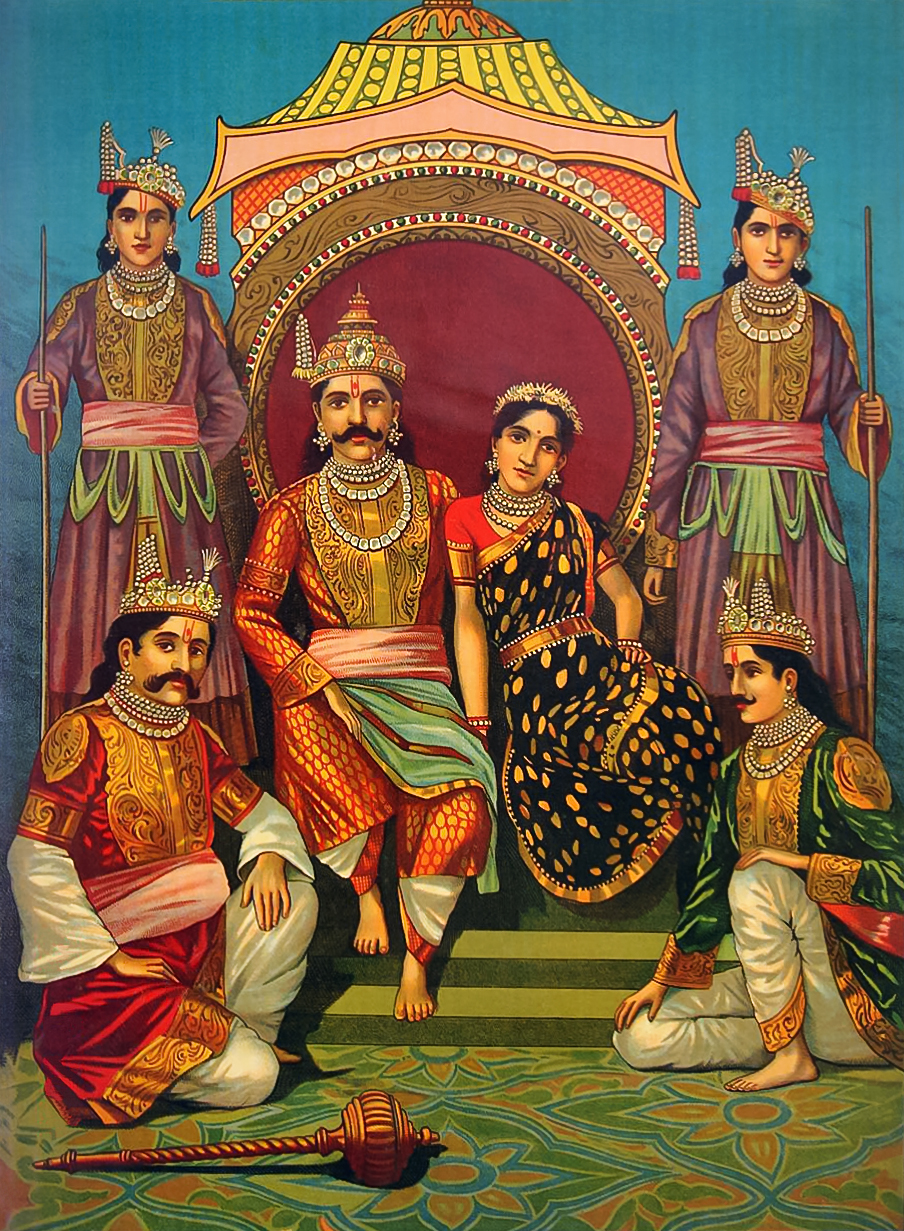
Draupadi and her husbands, the five Pandava brothers. Top down, from left to right: the twins Nakula and Sahadeva stand either side of the throne on which Yudhishthira and Draupadi sit between Bhima and Arjuna.

Polyandry (/ˈpɒliˌændri, ˌpɒliˈæn-/; from Ancient Greek πολύ (polú) 'many' and ἀνήρ (anḗr) 'man') is a form of polygamy in which a woman takes two or more husbands at the same time. Polyandry is contrasted with polygyny, involving one male and two or more females. If a marriage involves a plural number of "husbands and wives" participants of each gender, then it can be called polygamy, group or conjoint marriage. In its broadest use, polyandry refers to sexual relations with multiple males within or without marriage.

Of the 1,231 societies listed in the 1980 Ethnographic Atlas, 186 were found to be monogamous, 453 had occasional polygyny, 588 had more frequent polygyny, and four had polyandry. Polyandry is less rare than this figure suggests, as it considered only those examples found in the Himalayan mountain region (eight societies). More recent studies have found at least four other societies practicing polyandry.

Fraternal polyandry is practiced among Tibetans in Nepal and parts of China, in which two or more brothers are married to the same wife, with the wife having equal sexual access to them. It is associated with partible paternity, the cultural belief that a child can have more than one father. Several ethnic groups practicing polyandry in India identify their customs with their descent from Draupadi, a central character of the Mahabharata who was married to five brothers, although local practices may not be fraternal themselves.

Polyandry is believed to be more likely in societies with scarce environmental resources. It is believed to limit human population growth and enhance child survival. It is a rare form of marriage that exists not only among peasant families but also among elite families. For example, polyandry in the Himalayan mountains is related to the scarcity of land. The marriage of all brothers in a family to the same wife allows family land to remain intact and undivided. If every brother married separately and had children, family land would be split into unsustainable small plots. In contrast, very poor persons not owning land were less likely to practice polyandry in Buddhist Ladakh and Zanskar.

In Europe, the splitting up of land was prevented through the social practice of impartible inheritance. With most siblings disinherited, many of them became celibate monks and priests.

== Types ==
=== Successional polyandry ===
Unlike in fraternal polyandry (where a woman will receive a number of husbands simultaneously), in successional polyandry, a woman will acquire one husband after another in sequence.

This form is flexible. These men may or may not be related. And it may or may not incorporate a hierarchical system, where one husband is considered primary and may be allotted certain rights or privileges not awarded to secondary husbands, such as biologically fathering a child.

In cases where one husband has a primary role, the secondary husbands have the power to succeed the primary if he were to become severely ill or be away from the home for a long period of time or is otherwise rendered incapable of fulfilling his husbandly duties.

Successional polyandry can likewise be egalitarian, where all husbands are equal in status and receive the same rights and privileges. In this system, each husband will have a wedding ceremony and share the paternity of whatever children she may bear.

=== Associated polyandry ===
Another form of polyandry is a combination of polyandry and polygyny; whereas women are married to several men simultaneously and the same men may marry other women. It is found in some tribes of Africa such as villages in northern Nigeria and northern Cameroon. Usually, one of the woman's husbands will be chosen to be the husband of a woman from another tribe who would also have many husbands; this double-polyandrous union serves to form a marital alliance between tribes.

Other Classifications: Equal polygamy, Polygynandry

The system results in less land fragmentation, and a diversification of domestic activities.

=== Fraternal polyandry ===
Fraternal polyandry (from the Latin frater—brother), also called adelphic polyandry (from the Greek ἀδελφός—brother), is a form of polyandry in which a woman is married to two or more men who are brothers. Fraternal polyandry was (and sometimes still is) found in certain areas of Tibet, Nepal, and Northern India, as well as some central African cultures where polyandry was accepted as a social practice. The Toda people of southern India practiced fraternal polyandry, but monogamy has become prevalent recently. In contemporary Hindu society, polyandrous marriages in agrarian societies in the Malwa region of Punjab seem to occur to avoid division of farming land.

Fraternal polyandry achieves a similar goal to that of primogeniture in 19th-century England. Primogeniture dictated that the eldest son inherited the family estate, while younger sons had to leave home and seek their own employment. Primogeniture maintained family estates intact over generations by permitting only one heir per generation. Fraternal polyandry also accomplishes this, but does so by keeping all the brothers together with just one wife so that there is only one set of heirs per generation. This strategy appears less successful the larger the fraternal sibling group is.

Some forms of polyandry appear to be associated with a perceived need to retain aristocratic titles or agricultural lands within kin groups, and/or because of the frequent absence, for long periods, of a man from the household. In Tibet the practice was particularly popular among the priestly Sakya class.

The female equivalent of fraternal polyandry is sororate marriage.

=== Partible paternity ===
Anthropologist Stephen Beckerman points out that at least 20 tribal societies accept that a child could, and ideally should, have more than one father, referring to it as "partible paternity". This often results in the shared nurture of a child by multiple fathers in a form of polyandric relation to the mother, although this is not always the case. One of the most well known examples is that of Trobriand "virgin birth". The matrilineal Trobriand Islanders recognize the importance of sex in reproduction but do not believe the male makes a contribution to the constitution of the child, who therefore remains attached to their mother's lineage alone. The mother's non-resident husbands are not recognized as fathers, although the mother's co-resident brothers are, since they are part of the mother's lineage.

== Culture ==
According to inscriptions describing the reforms of the Sumerian king Urukagina of Lagash (c. 2300 BC), the earlier custom of polyandry in his country was abolished, on pain of the woman taking multiple husbands being stoned with stones upon which her crime was written.

An extreme gender imbalance has been suggested as a justification for polyandry. For example, the selective abortion of female children in India has led to a significant margin in sex ratio and, it has been suggested, results in related men "sharing" a wife.

== Known cases ==
Currently documented practice of polyandry, but not legally recognized. (Note: In South Africa, there is extensive legal debate about extending polygamy to women as well.) Former practice of polyandry, documented in the past, which disappeared following European colonization and Christianization. There is no tradition of polyandry.

Polyandry in Tibet was a common practice and continues to a lesser extent today. A survey of 753 Tibetan families by Tibet University in 1988 found that 13% practiced polyandry. Polyandry in India still exists among minorities, and also in Bhutan, and the northern parts of Nepal. Polyandry has been practised in several parts of India, such as Rajasthan, Ladakh and Zanskar, in the Jaunsar-Bawar region in Uttarakhand, among the Toda of South India.

It also occurs or has occurred in Nigeria, the Nymba, Irigwe and some pre-contact Polynesian societies, though probably only among higher caste women. It is also encountered in some regions of Yunnan and Sichuan regions of China, among the Mosuo people in China (who also practice polygyny as well), and among some sub-Saharan Africans such as the Maasai people in Kenya and northern Tanzania and American indigenous communities. The Guanches, the first known inhabitants of the Canary Islands, practiced polyandry until Spanish colonization. The Zo'e tribe in the state of Pará on the Cuminapanema River, Brazil, also practice polyandry.

=== Africa ===
Polyandry

- In the Lake Region of Central Africa, "Polygyny ... was uncommon. Polyandry, on the other hand, was quite common."
- Among the Irigwe of Northern Nigeria, women have traditionally acquired numerous spouses called "co-husbands".
- In August 2013, two Kenyan men entered into an agreement to marry a woman with whom they had both been having an affair. Kenyan law does not explicitly forbid polyandry, although it is not a common custom.

=== Asia ===
- In the reign of Urukagina of Lagash, "Dyandry, the marriage of one woman to two men, is abolished."
- M. Notovitck mentioned polyandry in Ladakh or Little 'Tibet' in his record of his journey to Tibet. ("The Unknown life of Jesus Christ" by Virchand Gandhi.)
- Polyandry was widely (and to some extent still is) practised in Lahaul-Spiti situated in isolation in the high Himalayas in India.
- Prior to Islam, in Arabia (southern) "All the kindred have their property in common ...; all have one wife" whom they share.
- The Hoa-tun (Hephthalites, White Huns) "living to the north of the Great Wall ... practiced polyandry." Among the Hephthalites, "the practice of several husbands to one wife, or polyandry, was always the rule, which is agreed on by all commentators. That this was plain was evidenced by the custom among the women of wearing a hat containing a number of horns, one for each of the subsequent husbands, all of whom were also brothers to the husband. Indeed, if a husband had no natural brothers, he would adopt another man to be his brother so that he would be allowed to marry."
- "Polyandry is very widespread among the Sherpas."
- In Bhutan in 1914, polyandry was "the prevailing domestic custom". Nowadays polyandry is rare, but still found for instance among the Brokpas of the Merak-Sakten region.
- In several villages in Nyarixung Township, Xigaze, Tibet, up to 90% of families practiced polyandry in 2008.
- Among the Gilyaks of Sakhalin Island "polyandry is also practiced."
- Fraternal polyandry was permitted in Sri Lanka under Kandyan Marriage law, often described using the euphemism eka-ge-kama (literally "eating in one house"). Associated Polyandry, or polyandry that begins as monogamy, with the second husband entering the relationship later, is also practiced and is sometimes initiated by the wife.
- Polyandry was common in Sri Lanka, until it was banned by the British in 1859.

=== Europe ===
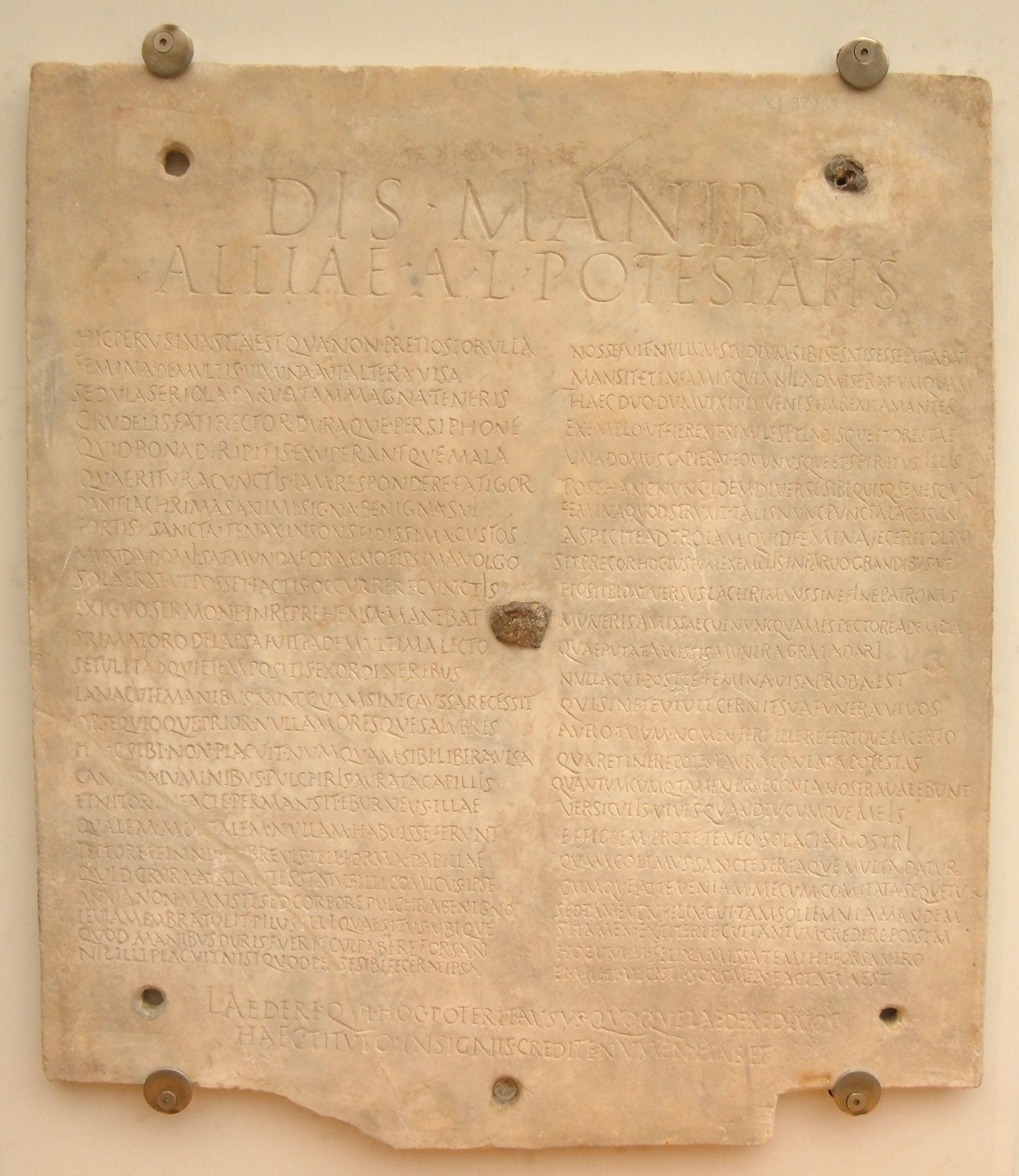
Sepulchral inscription for Allia Potestas, Museo Epigrafico, Terme di Diocleziano, Rome

- Reporting on the mating patterns in ancient Greece, specifically Sparta, Plutarch writes: "Thus if an older man with a young wife should take a liking to one of the well-bred young men and approve of him, he might well introduce him to her so as to fill her with noble sperm and then adopt the child as his own. Conversely a respectable man who admired someone else’s wife noted for her lovely children and her good sense, might gain the husband’s permission to sleep with her thereby planting in fruitful soil, so to speak, and producing fine children who would be linked to fine ancestors by blood and family."
- "According to Julius Caesar, it was customary among the ancient Britons for brothers, and sometimes for fathers and sons, to have their wives in common."
- "Polyandry prevailed among the Lacedaemonians according to Polybius." (Polybius vii.7.732, following Timæus)
- "The matrons of Rome flocked in great crowds to the Senate, begging with tears and entreaties that one woman should be married to two men."
- The gravestone of Allia Potestas, a woman from Perusia, describes how she lived peacefully with two lovers, one of whom immortalized her in his famous epigraphic eulogy, dating (probably) from the second century.

=== North America ===
- Aleut people in the 19th century
- Inuit

=== Oceania ===
- Among the Kanak of New Caledonia, "every woman is the property of several husbands. It is this collection of husbands, having one wife in common, that...live together in a hut, with their common wife."
- Marquesans had "a society in which households were polyandrous".
- Friedrich Ratzel in The History of Mankind reported in 1896 that in the New Hebrides there was a kind of convention in cases of widowhood, that two widowers shall live with one widow.

=== South America ===
- "The Bororos ... among them...there are also cases of polyandry."
- "The Tupi-Kawahib also practice fraternal polyandry."
- "...up to 70 percent of Amazonian cultures may have believed in the principle of multiple paternity"
- Mapuche polyandry is rare but not unheard of. The men are often brothers.

== Religious attitudes ==
=== Hinduism ===
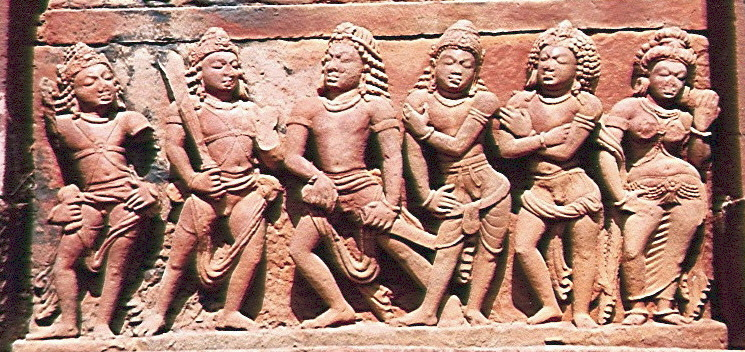
Draupadi with her five husbands – the Pandavas. The central figure is Yudhishthira; the two to his left are Bhima and Arjuna. Nakula and Sahadeva, the twins, are to his right. Their wife, at far right, is Draupadi. Deogarh, Dashavatara Hindu Temple.

There is at least one reference to polyandry in the ancient Hindu epic Mahabharata. Draupadi married the five Pandava brothers, as this is what she chose in a previous life. This ancient text remains largely neutral to the concept of polyandry, accepting this as her way of life. However, in the same epic, when questioned by Kunti to give an example of polyandry, Yudhishthira cites Jatila of the lineage of Gautama (married to the seven Saptarishi) and Hiranyaksha's sister Pracheti (married to ten brothers), thereby implying a more open attitude toward polyandry in Hindu society.

=== Judaism ===
The Hebrew Bible contains no examples of women married to more than one man, but its description of adultery clearly implies that polyandry is unacceptable and the practice is unknown in Jewish tradition. In addition, the children from other than the first husband are considered illegitimate (i.e., mamzers), unless he has already divorced her or died, being a product of an adulterous relationship.

=== Christianity ===
Most Christian denominations in the Western world strongly advocate monogamous marriage, and a passage from the Pauline epistles can be interpreted as forbidding polyandry.

=== Latter-Day Saints ===
Joseph Smith, Brigham Young, and other prominent early Mormons like Zina D. H. Young, Sarah M. Cleveland, Heber C. Kimball, and Orson Hyde, practiced religious polyandry beginning in the mid-1800s. The performance of new polygamous marriages in the Latter Day Saint movement's largest denomination, the Church of Jesus Christ of Latter-day Saints (LDS Church), was partially ended by the 1890 Manifesto, and completely discontinued by the 1904 Second Manifesto. Existing polygamous marriages, including those of prominent LDS Church leaders, continued into the 1950s.

=== Islam ===
According to Islamic marital law, polyandry is forbidden.

== In biology ==
Polyandrous behaviour exists in the animal kingdom, occurring for example in certain insects, fish, birds, and mammals.

== See also ==
- Legal status of polygamy
- Matrilineality
- Polygyny in India
- Polyandry in India
- Polyandry in Tibet
- Sacred prostitution
- Sexual conflict

Types of mating, marriage and lifestyle:

- Bigamy
- Cuckold
- Cuckquean
- Eusociality
- Group marriage
- Monogamy
- Non-monogamy
- Open marriage
- Polyamory
- Polygamy
- Polygynandry
- Polygyny
- Unicorn hunting
- Threesome
- Sororate marriage
- Lavender Marriage
