= Liberalism in Bangladesh =

The origins of the liberalism (Bengali: উদারনীতিবাদ, romanized: Udārnītibād) in Bangladesh can be traced from the anticolonial movements during the British Raj period. After the Partition of India, Bengali nationalist movements in the East Pakistan were led by the liberal and progressive activists. According to the columist Hasan Ferdous, the principles of "equality, human dignity and social justice", inspiring from the ideals of the French Revolution that enshrined in the Proclamation of Bangladeshi Independence, can be considered as the "guiding values" of the liberalism in modern-day Bangladesh.

== Economic liberalism ==
Early Bangladeshi leadership was dominated by the left-wing, who opposed the development of a capitalist system and promoted a strict protectionism, state intervention and economic regulation under a planned economy and limited market activities, which was characterized as "neither capitalist nor socialist" in nature. But economy remained stagnated, with a deadly famine hitting in 1974. In late 1970s and 1980s, various reforms, predominantly under the presidencies of reformists Ziaur Rahman and Hussain Muhammad Ershad were taken to boost economic growth and foreign investments, including the decentralization of state enterprises and trade liberalization. Contemporary Bangladesh is a liberal market economy and 33rd largest economy in the world.

== List of liberal political parties ==
- Bangladesh Nationalist Party
- Liberal Democratic Party
- Bangladesh Kalyan Party
- Nagorik Oikko

== See also ==
- Bengali Renaissance
- Progressivism in Bangladesh
- Socialism in Bangladesh
- Anarchism in Bangladesh
- Conservatism in Bangladesh
- Secularism in Bangladesh
- Liberalism in India
