= Conservatism in Bangladesh =

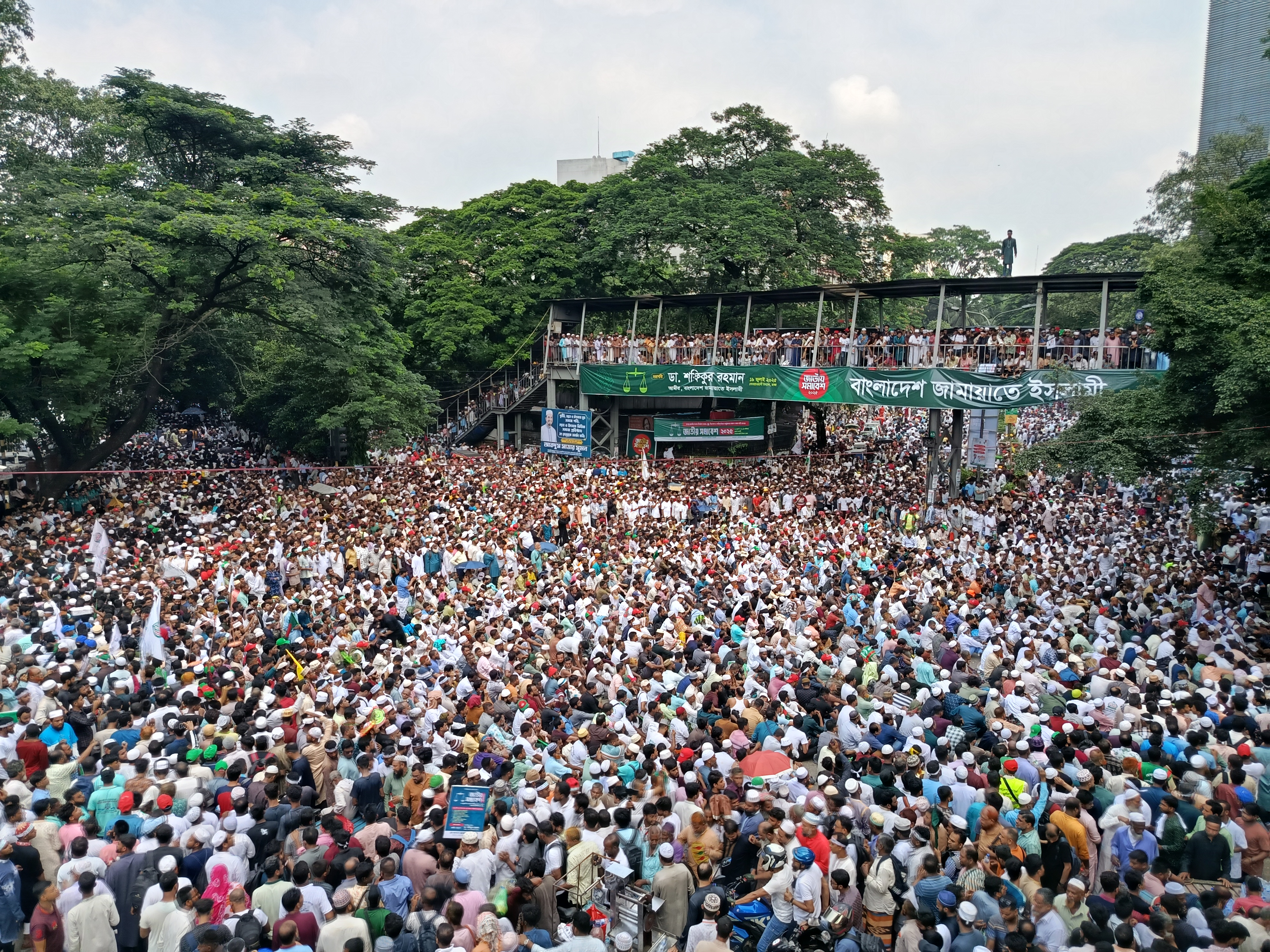
A rally of the Bangladesh Jamaat-e-Islami, known as a major conservative–Islamist party, 2025

Conservatism in Bangladesh refers to the national variant of conservatism (Bengali: রক্ষণশীলতাবাদ, romanized: Rôkṣôṇśīlôtābād) in the country. Bangladesh is a conservative country, where the state and the religion are closely intertwined to each other. Conservatism in Bangladesh is mostly based around upholding Islamic traditions and national culture, promotion of Islamism or right-wing forms of Bangladeshi nationalism, promoting national interests & strong defence policy, espousing skepticism on India, favouring economic liberalization, opposition to secularization & Westernization, and maintaining the role of Islam in the public sphere.

== Overview ==
Conservatism in Bangladesh sightly differs from that in the neighbouring countries like India or Pakistan, where it trends to be authoritarian, as Bangladeshi conservatives (with an exception of Hussain Muhammad Ershad) generally support multi-party liberal democracy, rule of law, social and economic justice, freedom of speech, freedom of the press, freedom of assembly, and freedom of religion. The term "conservatism" itself is rarely used in Bangladeshi politics, conservatives usually self-identify themselves as "nationalist", "Islamist", "Islamic" or "right-wing" depending upon the context and political background.

Being a Muslim-majority country, conservatism in Bangladesh is mainly defined by the role of Islam in the society and politics. The shift in Islam's role in post-independence Bangladesh began mainly in 1975, after the assassination of Sheikh Mujibur Rahman, the founding president of Bangladesh, and remained dominant till now. Early conservatives promoted national, social and religious conservatism, claiming Bangladeshi nationalism as its core value, which "represents a mixture of traditional Bengali customs and moderate Islam". Traditionally, the Bangladesh Army maintained close ideological ties with the centre-right and conservative parties of the country, arguing that the term "Bangladeshi nationalism" upholds the country's identity as a Muslim-majority nation. Upon taking power, Ziaur Rahman, the president of Bangladesh and founding chairman of the Bangladesh Nationalist Party (BNP), introduced a state-sponsored Islamisation that impacted significantly on society and culture. Secularism was removed from the constitution in 1979 and Islam was made the state religion in 1988. Like other parts of South Asia, competitive politics in Bangladesh is being increasingly confined to a conservative spectrum rather than traditional left–right spectrum.

Conservatism, in most cases, overlaps with Islamism in the country's politics. Its supporters oppose secularism in the country's constitution, as it is understood as irreligion and atheism by the conservative polity. Meanwhile, radical conservatives oppose western culture, calling it "alien culture", and seek to establish a religion-based state. Religious conservative strongly oppose LGBTQ+ rights in the country.

Bangladeshi society remains highly socially conservative compared to the West. According to a 2012 survey by the bdnews24.com, most Bangladeshis oppose homosexuality, same-sex marriage, gambling and drinking alcohol. According to experts interviewed by political scientist Tahmina Rahman between 2020 and 2022, "a puritan, ritualistic version of Islam" has gained prominence in the country, which overwhelms people's support for conservatism. Most recently in 2024, widespread revival of conservative Islam was observed among Bangladeshi youths, particularly due to the Awami League government's imposition of "secularisation" policies and "weaponization of victimhood" by the Islamists under AL regime.

== See also ==
- Islamization in Bangladesh
- Liberalism in Bangladesh
- Socialism in Bangladesh
- Anarchism in Bangladesh
- Progressivism in Bangladesh
- Secularism in Bangladesh
