= Radha and Krishna Walk in a Flowering Grove =

Painting by an artist known as The Kota Master

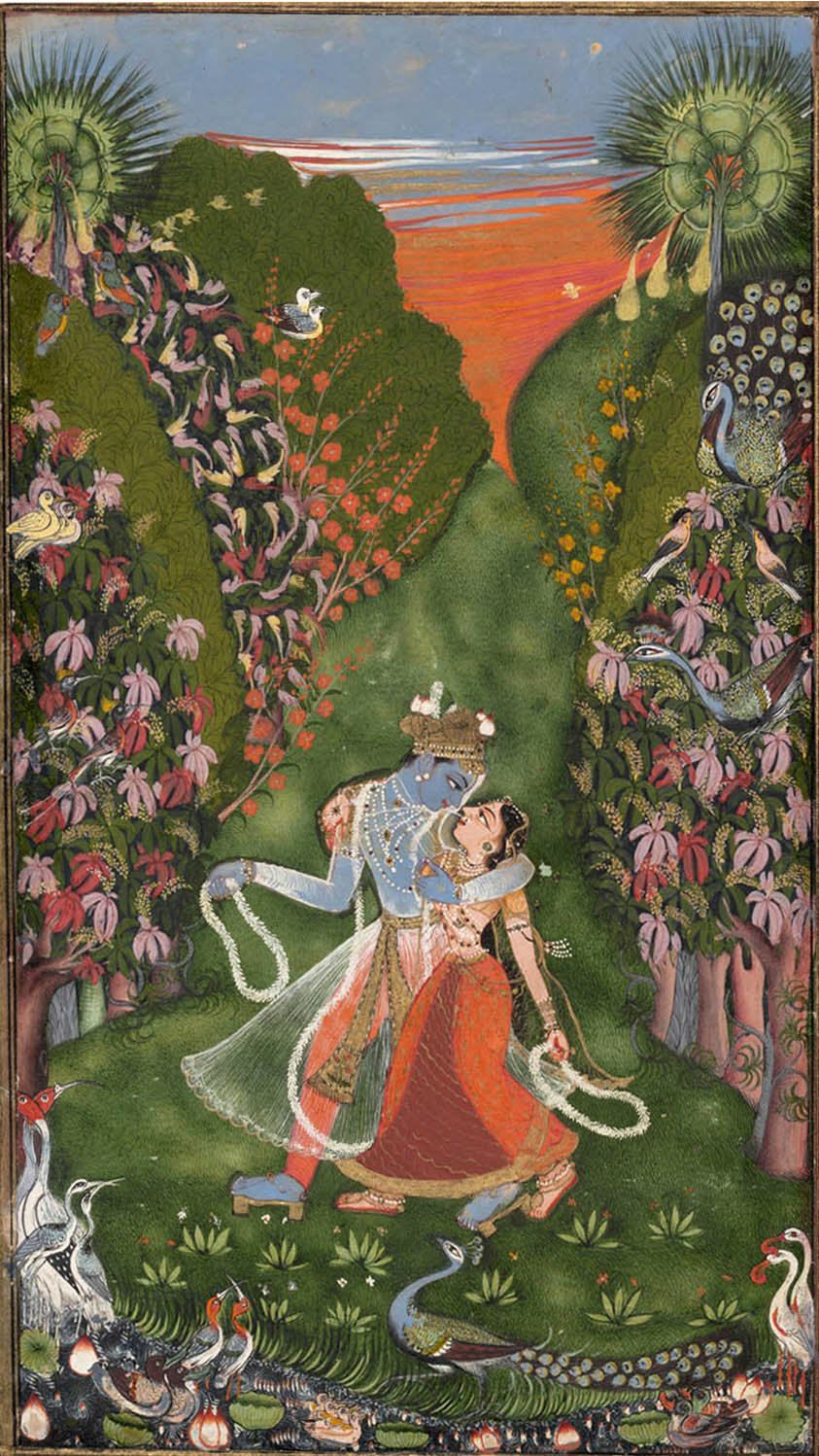
- Year: c. 1720
- Location: Metropolitan Museum of Art
- Identifiers: The Met object ID: 65594

Radha and Krishna Walk in a Flowering Grove is a circa 1720 painting by an unidentified artist known as The Kota Master. It is in the collection of the Metropolitan Museum of Art, / Asian Art.

== Early history and creation ==
The medium is ink, opaque watercolor, and gold on paper. It depicts contemporary nobles as the lovers Radha and Krishna. It measures 7 1/2 x 4 3/8 in. (19.1 x 11.1 cm). The verso depicts an image of Krishna playing the bansuri. This image is later and probably by a different artist, dating to between approximately 1750 and 1775. It measures 7 1/2 x 4 3/8 in. (19.1 x 11.1 cm).

== Later history and display ==
It is currently owned by the Metropolitan Museum of Art via the Cynthia Hazen Polsky and Leon B. Polsky Fund, 2003. As of 2019, it is not currently on view. It has been displayed six times since its acquisition from Terence McInerney Fine Arts Ltd in 2003. It was also loaned as part of an exhibit, "Vishnu: India's Blue-Skinned Savior" that appeared at the Frist Center for the Visual Arts in Nashville, Tennessee and The Brooklyn Museum in Brooklyn, New York.

== Description and interpretation ==
The work depicts Radha, Krishna, tree, flower, woman, and peacocks. It expresses their love through depiction of flowering trees, birds, and entwining clothing. It is the only known Kota depiction of a scene from Hindu scripture. The story was first told in Bhagavata Purana, although Radha was initially unidentified. "Radha, it was held, was the soul while Krishna was God. Radha's sexual passion for Krishna symbolized the soul's intense longing and her willingness to commit adultery expressed the utter priority which must be accorded to love for God."
