= Allia Potestas =

Roman woman known for her unusual epitaph

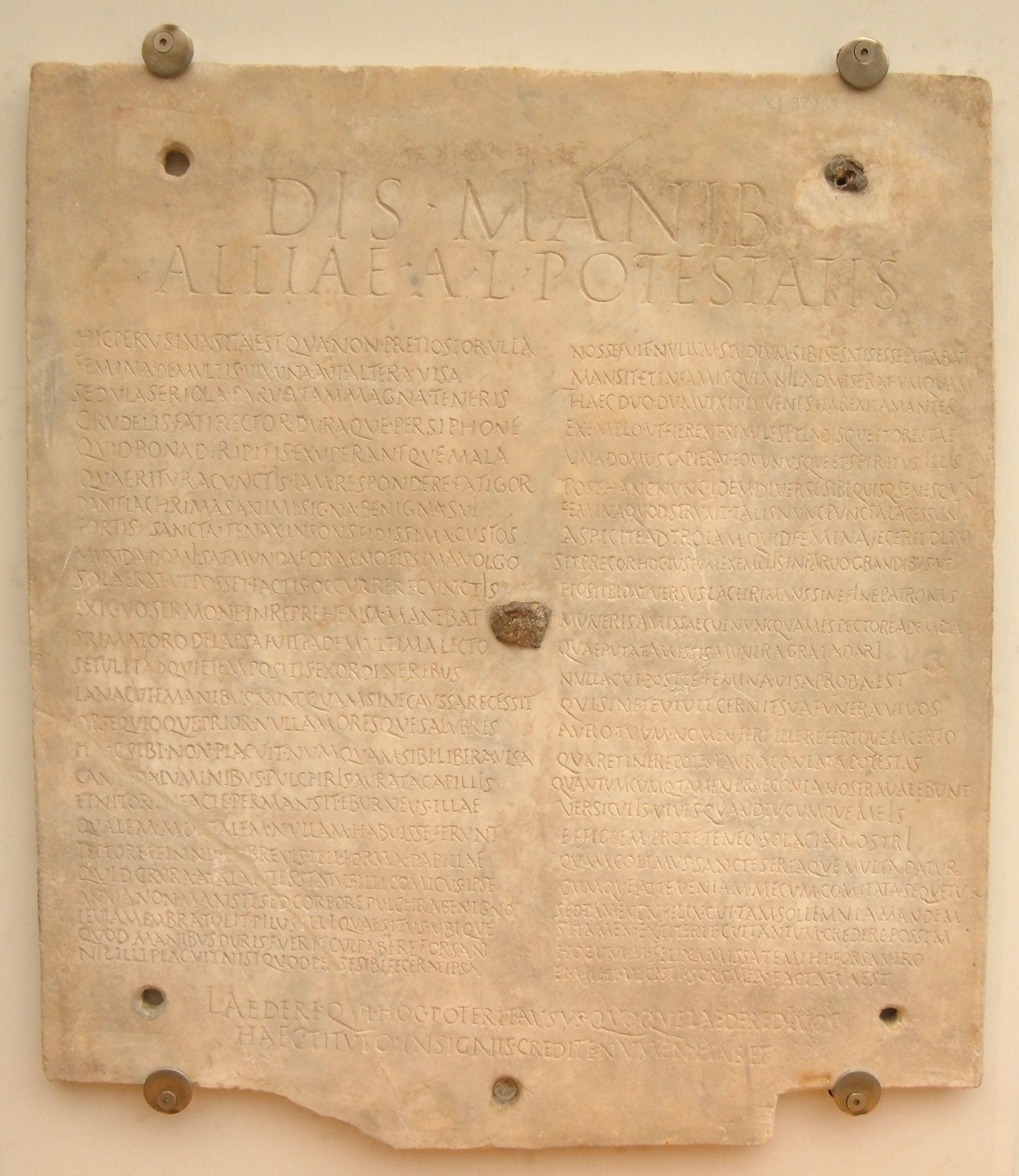
Sepulchral inscription for Allia Potestas, Museo Epigrafico, Rome

Allia Potestas was a freedwoman from the Roman town of Perugia who lived sometime during the 1st–4th centuries AD. She is known only through her epitaph, found on a marble tablet in Via Pinciana, Rome in 1912. The inscription, considered to be one of the most interesting of Latin epitaphs, is unique because it contains both typical epitaphic information and more personal and sexual details.

== Epitaph ==
In 1912, workmen who were making a foundation for a garage on the Via Pinciana in Rome found at a point 2 meters below the street-level a marble slab bearing a long inscription. The slab is broken in two pieces, but is otherwise well preserved. It measures about 23 by 26 inches. There are five holes, two at the top and, three at the bottom, evidently for fastening it up.

The 50-line epitaph is written in verse, mostly in dactylic hexameter. The author appears to have been well-read, with some of the poem imitating Ovid's Tristia. However, the majority of the poem is original in formulation.

This unusual inscription is not easy to classify, and its extravagant praise has been taken by some scholars for irony. The poem, apparently written by her lover, can be divided into three sections. The first focuses on Allia's virtues, describing her as extremely hardworking – "always the first to rise and the last to sleep... with her woolwork never leaving her hands without reason". The second extols her beauty with semi-erotic descriptions of her body and notes that she lived harmoniously with two lovers. Finally, the author laments her death and promises that she "shall live as long as may be possible through [his] verses."

The epitaph shows many of the stock characteristics of sepulchral inscriptions; it dwells on the unfairness of fate, the beauty and household virtues of the deceased, the grief of the bereaved, etc. The unusual thing here is the very obvious influence of Ovid.

== Significance ==
The epitaph is original and rather unusual among surviving epitaphs for several reasons.

- The open treatment of polyandry – Allia lives harmoniously with "her two young lovers", "like the model of Pylades and Orestes."
- The erotic physical description – Allia "kept her limbs smooth" and "on her snow-white breasts, the shape of her nipples was small."
- The absence of typical formulated gravestone poetry.

Most surviving epitaphs portray their subjects in a more, from a Roman perspective, ideal light. Women in Rome were expected to be "devoted to housekeeping, child bearing, chastity, submissiveness, and the ideal of being all her life univira (one-man woman)".

It was first published by G. Mancini, in the Notizie degli Scavi, 1912, 155 ff. The first important study of it was printed by M. L. De Gubernatis, in the Rivista di Filologia, 1913, 385. This gave an excellent facsimile, a punctuated text, and a commentary with a list of parallels. It was published again, with a commentary, by C. Pascal, in Atene e Roma, 1913, 257 ff. The most important of the later discussions is that by W. Kroll in Philologus, 1914, 274 ff.

== Ethnicity ==
Allia was probably of Greek descent. It is likely that the name Potestas, meaning "power" in Latin, was merely a translation of the Greek name Dynamis, also meaning "power".

== Date ==
Much controversy surrounds the exact dating of the epigraph. Upon first discovery, the work was dated to the 3rd–4th centuries AD on paleographic grounds, and thus this date is often used. Other stylistic and linguistic analysis suggests that the 2nd century AD is more likely. Regardless, most scholars agree it is no older than the 1st century AD, due to the apparent Ovidian influence.

== English translation ==
To the Manes of Allia Potestas, freedwoman of Allius.

Here lies one who came from Perusia. A better woman was never seen, or at least of all women scarcely one or two surpassed her. All your active body is confined in a little urn. Cruel lord of death and stern Persephone, why do you snatch away what is good and let the worthless remain? Everyone asks for her and I am weary of replying; their tears show their love for her. Strong, honest, frugal, upright, most trusty of housekeepers, neat in the house and on the street, well known to everybody, she could face every task by herself. A woman of few words she was without reproach. She was the first to rise from her couch, and the last to betake herself to the quiet of her bed after everything had been done in due order. Never did the wool leave her hands without good cause. No one surpassed her in unselfish devotion and in helpful ways. She was not too well pleased with herself and never thought of herself as free. She was fair, with beautiful eyes and golden hair. No other woman's face was of such ivory-like brightness, they say; her breasts, white as snow, showed their slight form. What shall I say of her legs? She had the bearing of a very Atalanta on the stage. She did not worry about her toilet, but she had a beautiful body and she kept her limbs smooth. Her hands were hard, and perhaps you will count that a fault; but nothing pleased her except what she had done herself with her own hands. She had no wish to make acquaintances, but was content with herself. She was not much talked of because she had done nothing to cause it. While she lived she so managed two youthful lovers that they were like Pylades and Orestes. One house sheltered them both and they lived together in harmony. But now since her death these two men are estranged and each grows old by himself. The work which such a woman accomplished now a few moments destroy. Look at Troy, what a woman once did, if one may compare great affairs with the small.

Your patronus with tears that know no end gives these verses as a tribute to you who are lost — your patronus from whose heart you have never been torn — verses which he thinks are pleasing gifts for the dead. Since your death no woman has seemed good to him. He who lives without you, while still living, sees his own death. Your name in gold he always wears upon his arm, there where he can protect it; power (Potestas) is entrusted to gold. And yet as far as my praises shall avail, and as long as my verses live, (you shall live). To comfort me I have an image of you which I cherish as sacred, and to which many a garland is given; and when I come to you, it, too, shall come. Unhappy that I am, to whom shall I commit the solemn rites in your honor? Still, if I find anyone to whom I can give such a trust, in this one respect I shall perhaps count myself fortunate though you are gone from me. Ah me, you have prevailed; as your life is ended, so I, too, live no more. He who insults this tomb, has dared to insult the gods as well. Be assured that she who is celebrated in this inscription has a divinity to protect her.
