= Polyandry in India =

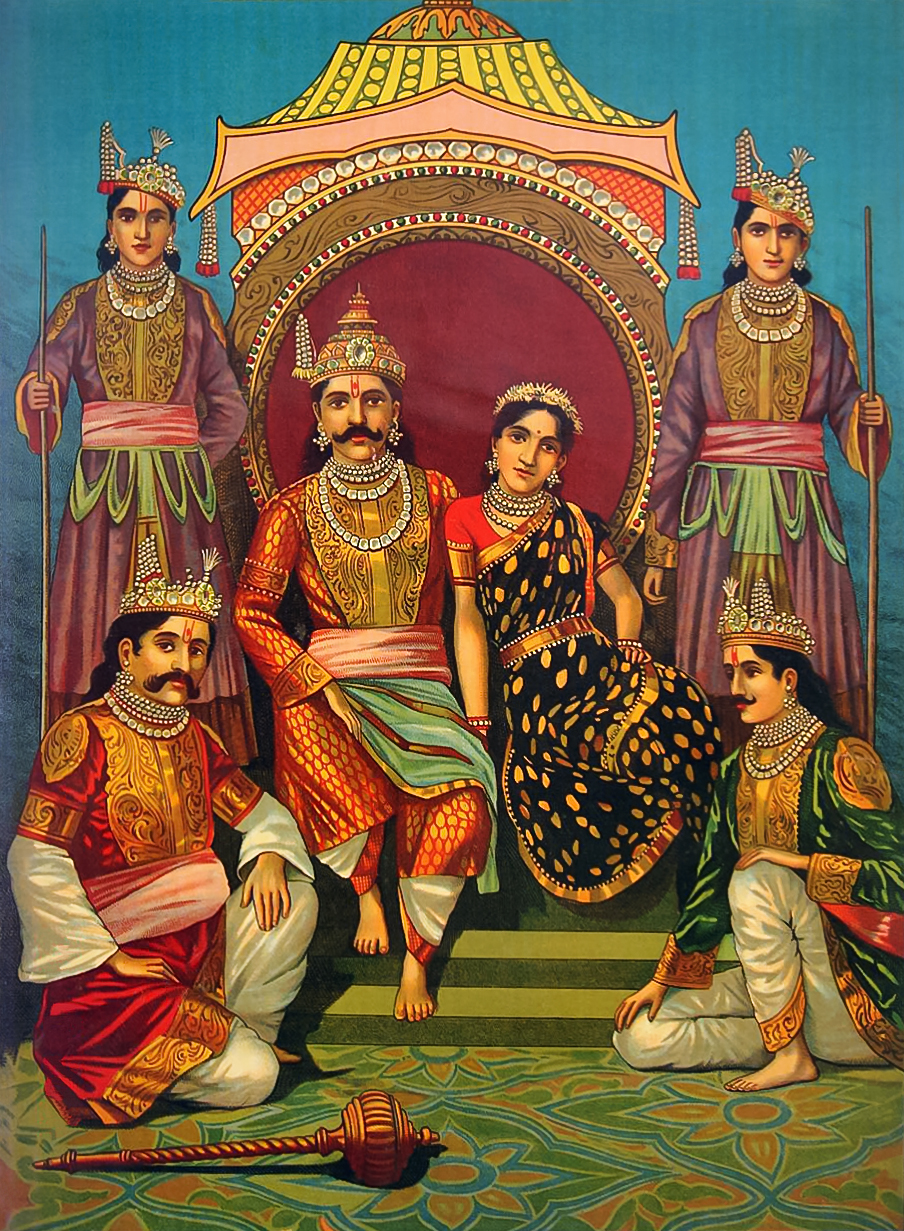
Draupadi and her five husbands, the Pandavas. Top down, from left to right: the twins Nakula and Sahadeva stand either side of the throne on which Yudhishthira and Draupadi sit between Bhima and Arjuna.

Polyandry in India refers to the practice of polyandry, whereby a woman has two or more husbands at the same time, either historically on the Indian subcontinent or currently in the country of India. An early example can be found in the Hindu epic Mahābhārata, in which Draupadi, daughter of the king of Panchala, is married to five brothers.

Polyandry was mainly prevalent in the Kinnaur region, a part of Himachal Pradesh in India which is close to the Tibet or currently the China–India border. As mentioned in the epic Mahabharata, the Pandavas were banished from their kingdom for thirteen years and they spent the last year hiding in this hilly terrain of Kinnaur. Some Kinnauris claim that this practice has been inherited from the Pandavas, who they identify as their ancestors. The Jaunsari people similarly identify their practice of polyandry with their descent from the Pandavas.

Polyandry is also seen in South India among the Todas tribes of Nilgiris, Nanjanad Vellala of Travancore. While polyandrous unions have disappeared from the traditions of many of the groups and tribes, it is still practiced by some in the Jaunsar-Bawar region in North India.

Recent years have seen the rise in fraternal polyandry in the agrarian societies in Malwa region of Punjab to avoid division of farming land.

== Legal developments ==
Section 494 and 495 of the Indian Penal Code of 1860, prohibited polygamy for the Christians. In 1955, the Hindu Marriage Act was drafted, which prohibited marriage of a Hindu whose spouse was still living. Thus polygamy became illegal in India in 1956.

== Himachal Pradesh ==
Polyandry is in practice in many villages of Kinnaur district of Himachal Pradesh. Fraternal polyandry (where husbands are related to each other) is mainly in practice in villages, where the societies are male dominated and which still follow ancient rituals and customs.

There are many forms of polyandry which can be found here. Most often, all the brothers are married to a woman and sometimes the marriage to brothers happens at a later date. The wife can only ascertain the blood-relationship of the children, though recently there have been a few instances of paternity tests using DNA samples to resolve inheritance disputes. The rules for breaking the marriage are strict and a brother going against the marriage agreement can be treated as an outcast while losing his entire share in the property.

Historically, fraternal polyandry has been practiced by wealthier families, associated with a higher caste, in Kinnaur as a way to keep wealth within one family. This allowed for land to be properly inherited and kept in one family. It was assurance that the land and wealth held by one family could not be partitioned. Those in lower castes also practiced fraternal polyandry if they had a larger amount of land.

The territory of Kinnaur remained forbidden for many years as the land route was only established 30 years ago. The joint families are now fragmented into nuclear families. The level of economies and financial resources have transformed the life of the people of Kinnaur into city.

== Kerala ==
Polyandry and polygamy were prevalent in Kerala till the late 19th century and isolated cases were reported until the mid-20th century. Castes practicing polyandry were Nairs, Thiyyas, Viswabrahmanar, and Mukkuvar of Kerala Historians assert that there exists no authenticated case of polyandry among the Nairs. The evidence presented for such a custom during the sixteenth, seventeenth, and eighteenth centuries primarily stems from accounts provided by foreign travelers who were prohibited from approaching within sixty yards of a Nair's residence. Consequently, their testimonies offer an exceedingly unsatisfactory basis for definitive conclusions regarding Nair customs. Conversely, the extensive Malayalam literature on the subject provides a more nuanced and culturally informed perspective.

In the case of polyandry, a man's property is inherited by his sister's children and not his own. Under a polyandrous system, the only verifiable blood-relationships could be ascertained through females. However, polyandry is a contested issue with opinion divided between those who support its existence and those who do not. Ezhavas, Mukkuvas, Viswabrahmanar of Kerala also practised polyandry. The custom of fraternal polyandry was common among Thiyyas of Malabar and ezhavas. According to Cyriac Pullipally, female members of the Thiyya, ezhava, and mukkuvas community associated with English, French, Dutch, and Portuguese men as their concubines.

== Punjab and Haryana ==
In certain areas of Punjab, especially the Bathinda and Mansa districts of Malwa region, poor farmers follow the practice of polyandry under economic compulsion to avoid further fragmentation of their already small landholdings. A study conducted in 2019 by Panjab University found evidence of polyandry in Haryana and Punjab. The study culminated in the book Gender Culture and Honour and found cases of wife sharing in the districts of Yamunanagar in Haryana and Mansa and Fatehgarh Sahib of Punjab.

== Tamil Nadu ==
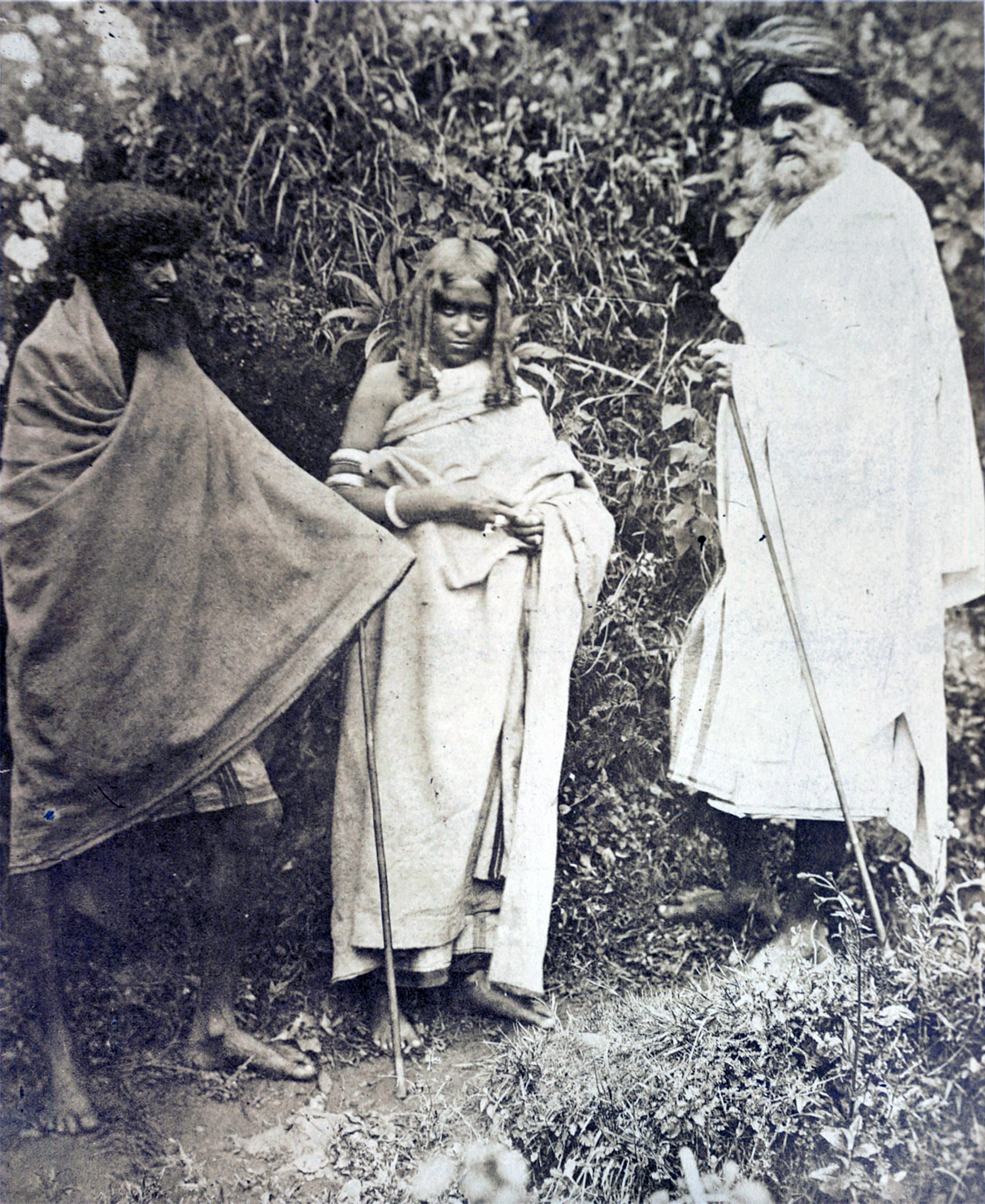
Photograph of two Toda men and a woman. Nilgiri Hills, 1871.

Todas are tribal people residing in the Nilgiri hills in Tamil Nadu who for several centuries practiced polyandry. They practiced a form of polyandrous relationship which is considered to be a classic example of polyandry. They practiced both fraternal and sequential polyandry.

The men who shared one or two wives were not always full or half-brothers. A Toda woman when married was automatically married to her husband's brothers. When the wife became pregnant, one husband would ceremonially give a bow and arrow to the wife, and would be the father of that child. When the next child arrived, same husband who performed that ceremony continues to be called father even though child is not biologically related to him, unless another husband would perform the ceremony and become the father.

== Uttarakhand ==
Polyandry was practised in Jaunsar-Bawar in Uttarakhand. Jaunsaris live in the lower ranges of Himalayas in Northern India from southeastern Kashmir all the way through Nepal. Polyandry has been reported among these people in many districts but studied in great detail in Jaunsar-Bawar. It is a region in Dehradun district in Uttarakhand. The practice is believed to have descended from their ancestors who had earlier settled down in the plains from Himalayas.

Polyandrous union occurs in this region when a woman marries the eldest son in a family. The woman automatically becomes the wife of all his brothers upon her marriage. The brothers can be married to more than one woman if the first woman was sterile or if the age difference of the brothers were large. The wife is shared equally by all brothers and no one in the group has exclusive privilege to the wife. The woman considers all the men in the group her husband and the children recognise them all as their father.

== Tibetans in India ==
By 1976, 83.3% of Tibetans who were exiled from China had taken refuge in India. In Tibet, monogamy, polygamy, and polyandry have traditionally been practiced. Some Tibetan refugees now settled in India practice polyandry as a result of their material conditions. Fraternal polyandry is a way for Tibetans to avoid having to build multiple houses every time a male in the family marries. One wife married to many brothers allows for less resources to be used on one brother and his one wife. Polyandry is also a way for Tibetans to not have to marry non-Tibetans whilst they are settled in India.

== Other tribal peoples ==
Polyandry

Fraternal polyandry exists among the Khasa of Dehradun; the Mala Madessar, the Mavilan, etc. of Kerala and among the Sirmur, Shimla, Kullu, and Lahaul-Spiti of Himachal Pradesh. Non-fraternal polyandry exists among the Kota; and among the Karvazhi, Pulaya, Muthuvan, and Mannan in Kerala.

In the 1911 Census of India, E.A. Gait mentions polyandry of the Bhotias, Kanets of Kulu valley, people of state of Bashahr, Thakkars and Megs of Kashmir, Gonds of Central Provinces, Todas and Kurumbas of Nilgiris, Kallars of Madurai, Tolkolans of Malabar, Ezhavas, Kaniyans and Kammalans of Cochin, Muduvas of Travancore and of Nairs.

== See also ==
- Polygamy in India
