= Anarchism in India =

Anarchism in India first emerged within the Indian independence movement, gaining particularly notoriety for its influence on Mohandas Gandhi's theory of Sarvodaya and his practice of nonviolent resistance. Anarchism was also an influence on the revolutionary movement, inspiring the works of Har Dayal, M. P. T. Acharya and Bhagat Singh, among others.

== Background ==
The foundations for anarchism in India were laid by a number of different religious traditions in the subcontinent. Buddhism and Jainism both taught of a prehistoric state of nature, in which people lived in harmony and their needs were satisfied by the land. In Hindu cosmology, the Satya Yuga described a possible stateless society where people were governed only by the "universal natural law of dharma". Whereas ancient Hindu thought described the king as a supreme authority, the Chanakya sutras held that "it is better not to have a king then have one who is wanting in discipline".

It was through these concepts that Indian anarchism developed out of "non-statism", which held it better to build an alternative society that would make the state redundant, rather than destroying the state outright (as in the Western conception of anti-statism).

== Early libertarian thought ==
Swami Vivekananda derived a form of individualism from the Bhagavad Gita, arguing that "liberty is the first condition of growth". He saw individual freedom as something that leads directly to solidarity and social equality, as individual self-actualization would necessarily bring people together. He claimed his ultimate goal was "freedom from the slavery of matter and thought, mastery of external and internal nature."

One disciple of Vivekananda was Sri Aurobindo, who applied his libertarian principles to the Indian independence movement, agitating for "non-violent direct action". Aurobindo's philosophy was concerned with reconciling individualism and collectivism, proposing a synthesis of individual enlightenment with community outreach. In The Ideal of Human Unity, Aurobindo advocated for the nation state to be replaced with a form of anarchy, based on voluntary associations between "free individuals" and the principle of "unity in diversity".

Aurobindo's theory of nonviolent resistance was later developed upon by Mohandas Gandhi, who was himself inspired by the Russian anarcho-pacifist Leo Tolstoy to organize a mass civil disobedience movement against British rule in India. He viewed the state fundamentally as an expression of violence and feared the expansion of state power, as he believed it would stifle individuality. Gandhi declared his ideal society to be a form of self-governed stateless society, which he described as "enlightened anarchy". However, he would end up collaborating with the Indian National Congress and felt that the temporary existence of an Indian state would be necessary in a transition towards anarchy.

== Gandhi and anarchism ==
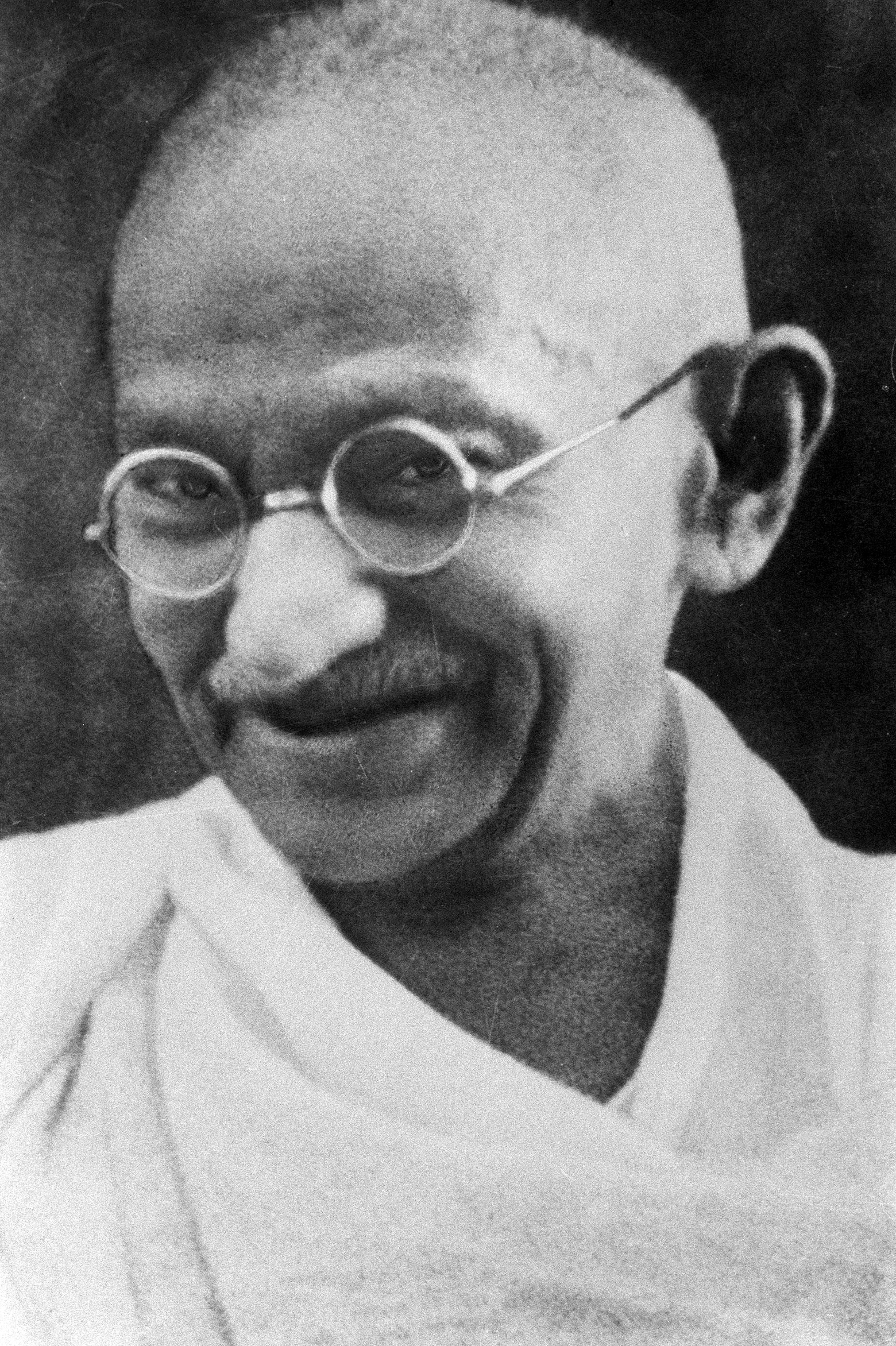
Mohandas Karamchand Gandhi

The local conditions were pertinent to the development of the heavily anarchic Satyagraha movement in India. George Woodcock claimed Mohandas Gandhi self-identified as an anarchist. Gandhi also considered Leo Tolstoy's book, The Kingdom of God is Within You, a book about practical anarchist organisation, as the text to have the most influence in his life.

To Gandhi, the root of all social problems lay in violence and therefore in the state, which maintains a monopoly on violence, holding that "the nearest approach to purest anarchy would be a democracy based on nonviolence." He advocated for the implementation of Swaraj (self-governance) starting with individuals, before moving up through the village, region and finally the national level. Swaraj was thus based in a form of individualist anarchism, rejecting majority rule, parliamentarism and political parties, while holding that individual morality should be the guiding force of the wider society and that any collective organization should be subordinate to the will of the individuals which make it up.

In his essay "Reflections on Gandhi" (1949), George Orwell noted that anarchists and pacifists had claimed Gandhi as an adherent of their own traditions, but argued that in doing so they ignored "the other-worldly, anti-humanist tendency of his doctrines." Orwell argued that Gandhian thought required religious belief, and so could not be reconciled with anarchists' humanism.

== Bhagat Singh ==
Before 1920, a partly anarchist inspired movement was represented by one of the most famous revolutionaries of the Indian independence movement, Bhagat Singh. Though a Marxist, Bhagat Singh was attracted to anarchism. Western anarchism and communism had influence on him. He studied the writings of Mikhail Bakunin, Karl Marx, Vladimir Lenin and Leon Trotsky. Singh wrote in an article:

The ultimate goal of Anarchism is complete independence, according to which no one will be ... crazy for money ... There will be no chains on the body or control by the state. This means that they want to eliminate ... the state; private property.

Singh was involved in the Hindustan Socialist Republican Association and Naujawan Bharat Sabha (Translated to 'Youth Society of India'). By the mid-1920s Singh began arming of the general population and organised people's militias against the British. From May 1928 to September 1928, Singh published several articles on anarchism in Punjabi periodical "Kirti".

== Har Dayal's anarchist activism in US ==
Indian revolutionary and the founder of the Ghadar Party Lala Har Dayal was involved in the anarchist movement in United States. He moved to the United States in 1911, where he became involved in industrial unionism. In Oakland, he founded the Bakunin Institute of California which he described as "the first monastery of anarchism". The organisation aligned itself with the Regeneracion movement founded by the exiled Mexicans Ricardo and Enrique Flores Magón. Har Dayal understood the realisation of ancient Aryan culture as anarchism, which he also saw as the goal of Buddhism. The Ghadar Party attempted to overthrow the British in India by reconciling western concepts of social revolution - particularly those stemming from Mikhail Bakunin - with Buddhism.

== Dave Andrews ==
Australian Christian anarchist Dave Andrews lived in India between 1972 and 1984. In 1975, he and his wife founded and developed a residential community in India called Aashiana (out of which grew Sahara, Sharan and Sahasee – three well-known Christian community organisations working with slum dwellers, sex workers, drug addicts, and people with HIV/AIDS). When Indira Gandhi was assassinated in 1984, thousands of Sikhs were murdered by violent mobs. Andrews resisted this through non-violent methods of intervention. The Andrews couple were forced to flee India soon thereafter.

== List of anarchist organizations ==
- The Scarlet Underground

== See also ==
- Category:Indian anarchists
- List of anarchist movements by region
- Anarchism in Bangladesh
- Communism in India
- Indian independence movement
- Socialism in India

== Bibliography ==
- Clark, John P. (2013). "The Common Good: Sarvodaya and the Gandhian Legacy". The Impossible Community: Realizing Communitarian Anarchism. New York: Bloomsbury. pp. 217–245. ISBN 978-1-4411-5451-4. OCLC 859374886.
- Cohn, Jesse (2009). "Anarchism, India". In Ness, Immanuel (ed.). The International Encyclopedia of Revolution and Protest. Malden, Massachusetts: Wiley-Blackwell. pp. 1–3. doi:10.1002/9781405198073.wbierp0059. ISBN 9781405198073. OCLC 8682129071.
- Doctor, Adi Hormusji (1964). Anarchist Thought in India. Bombay; New York: Asia Publishing House. OCLC 16762946.
- Elam, J. Daniel (2013). "The 'arch priestess of anarchy' visits Lahore: violence, love, and the worldliness of revolutionary texts". Postcolonial Studies. 16 (2): 140–154. doi:10.1080/13688790.2013.823258.
- Laursen, Ole Birk (2019). "Anti-Colonialism, Terrorism and the 'Politics of Friendship': Virendranath Chattopadhyaya and the European Anarchist Movement, 1910-1927". Anarchist Studies. 27 (1): 47–62. ProQuest 2190923320.
- Marshall, Peter H. (2008) [1992]. "India". Demanding the Impossible: A History of Anarchism. London: Harper Perennial. pp. 528–535. ISBN 978-0-00-686245-1. OCLC 218212571.
- Ostergaard, Geoffrey; Currell, Melville (1971). The Gentle Anarchists: a study of the leaders of the Sarvodaya movement for non-violent revolution in India. Oxford: Clarendon Press. ISBN 978-0198271796. OCLC 201279.
- Ramnath, Maia (2011). Decolonizing Anarchism: An Anti-authoritarian History of India's Liberation Struggle. Edinburgh: AK Press and the Institute for Anarchist Studies. ISBN 9781849350822. OCLC 939097339.
