= Anarchism in Bangladesh =

Anarchism in Bangladesh has its roots in the ideas of the Bengali Renaissance and began to take influence as part of the revolutionary movement for Indian independence in Bengal. After a series of defeats of the revolutionary movement and the rise of state socialist ideas within the Bengali left-wing, anarchism went into a period of remission. This lasted until the 1990s, when anarchism again began to reemerge after the fracturing of the Communist Party of Bangladesh, which led to the rise of anarcho-syndicalism among the Bangladeshi workers' movement.

== History ==
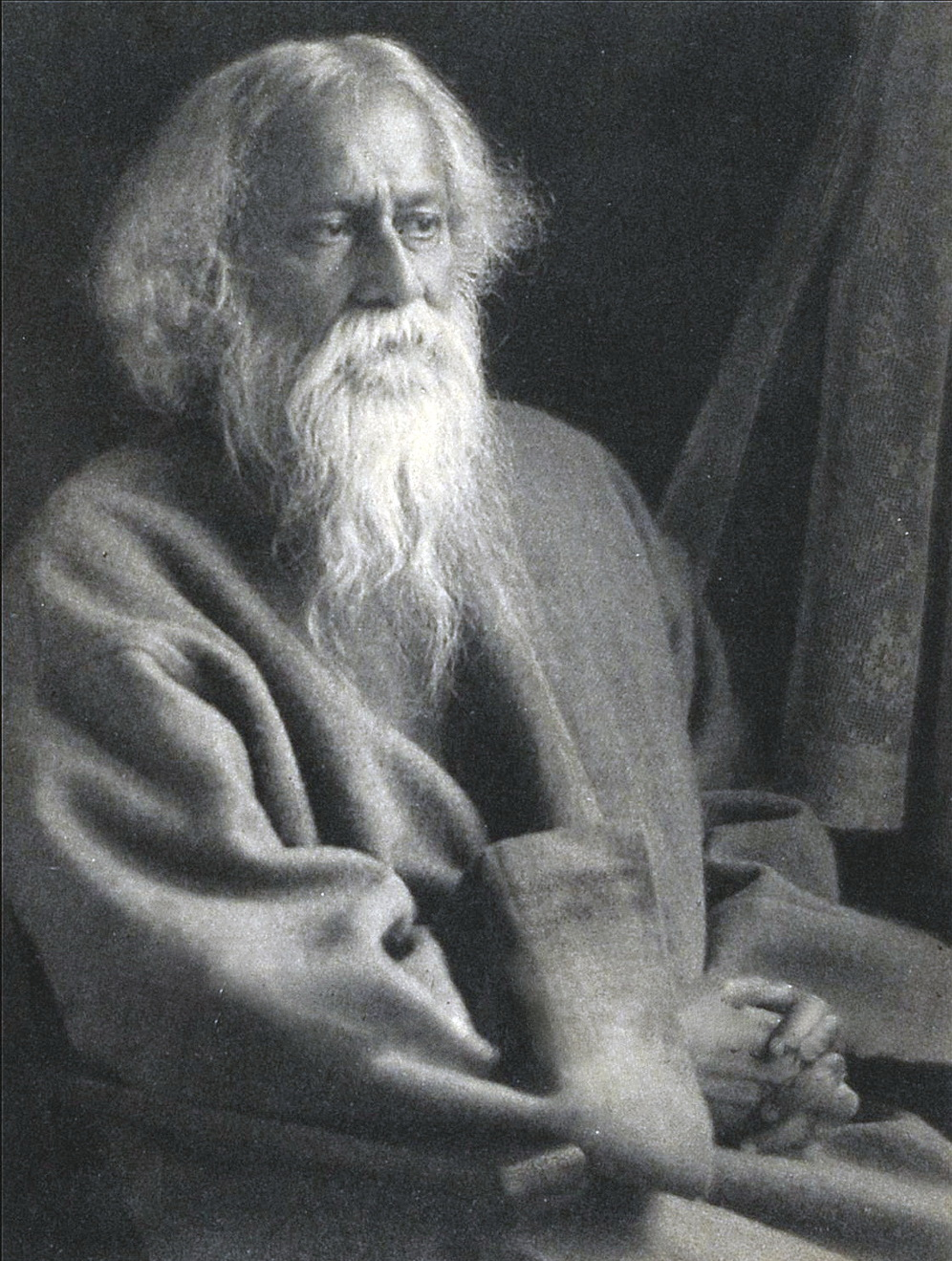
Rabindranath Tagore, a prominent figure within the Bengali Renaissance and a proponent of internationalism, in part inspired by anarchist ideas.

Bengal was largely stateless until the 6th century BCE, when the later Vedic Period gave way to the rule of the Mahajanapadas, with the Vanga Kingdom coming to rule over the Gangaridai region. Bengal subsequently was ruled by a succession of Hindu and Buddhist empires before the conquests of Muhammad bin Bakhtiyar Khalji eventually introduced Islam to the region. In the 14th century, the Bengal Sultanate was established as an independent power, but it was later conquered by the Mughal Empire, which established the Bengal Subah in the sultanate's place. By the 18th century, Bengal began to regain independence under the Nawabs and subsequently underwent an Industrial Revolution. But the region soon became a locus for European colonial powers, with the British East India Company eventually annexing Bengal into the British Empire, bringing it under the rule of the Bengal Presidency.

=== Bengali Renaissance ===
In the early 19th century, the Bengali Renaissance began to spread throughout the Bengali community, beginning with the establishment of the Atmiya Sabha discussion circle in Kolkata by Ram Mohan Roy. The group promoted free thinking and fought for social reforms such as the abolition of the sati, polygamy, child marriage and the caste system, setting the groundwork for the early feminist movement. In 1828, Ram Mohan Roy and Debendranath Tagore founded the Brahmo Samaj religious movement, which initially aimed at reforming Hinduism, but later broke from Hindu orthodoxy entirely.

Debendranath's son Rabindranath Tagore went on to become of the foremost figures in the Renaissance, reshaping Bengali literature and music. He denounced the rule of the British Raj and advocated for Bengali independence from the empire, expounding a humanist, universalist and internationalist philosophy. A staunch anti-nationalist, Tagore wrote in his essay on nationalism:

[L]ook at those who call themselves anarchists, who resent the imposition of power, in any form whatever, upon the individual. The only reason for this is that power has become too abstract—it is a scientific product made in the political laboratory of the Nation, through the dissolution of personal humanity.

=== Bengali revolutionary movement ===
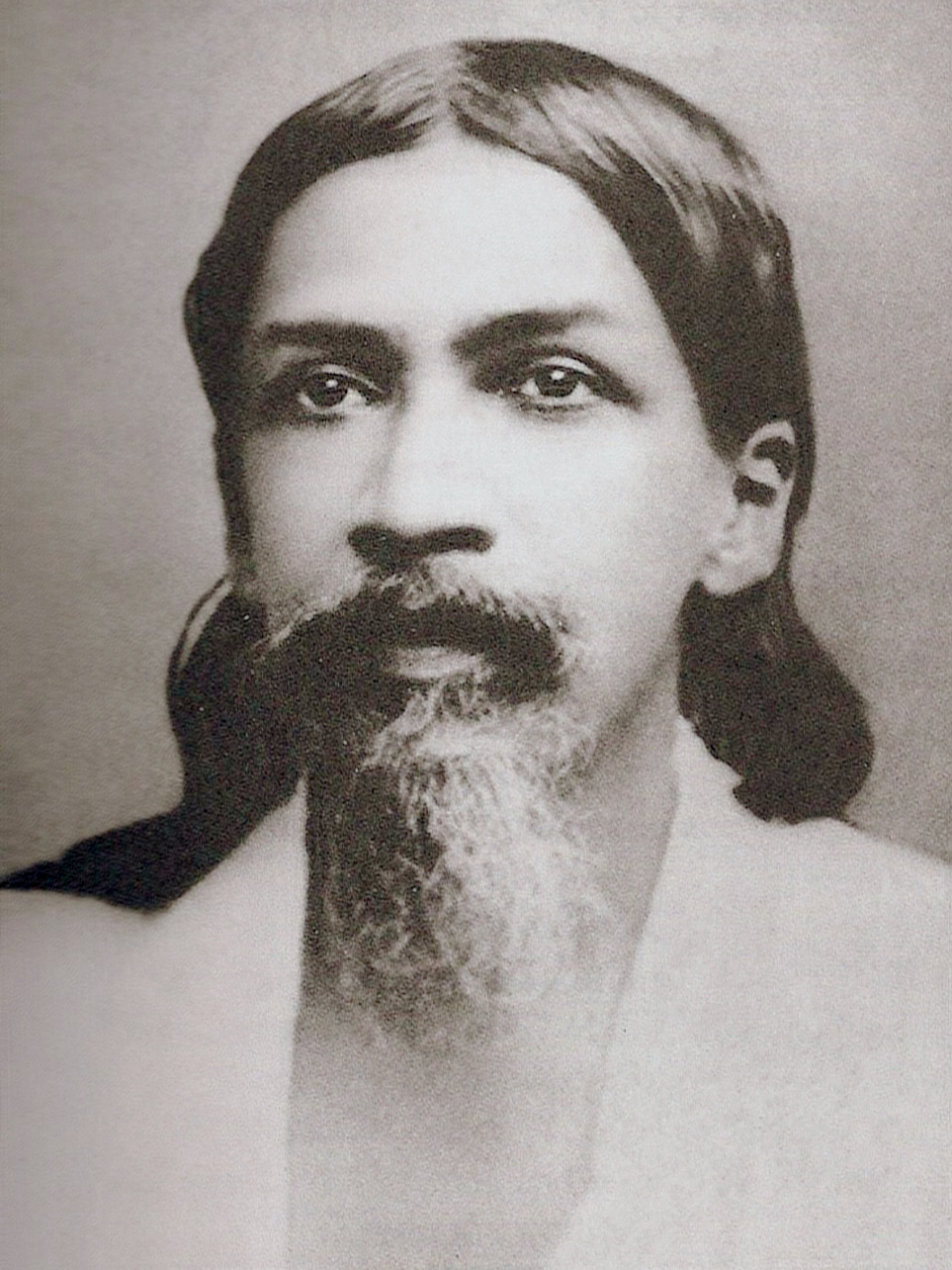
Aurobindo Ghose, a founder of the Bengali revolutionary movement in the early 20th century

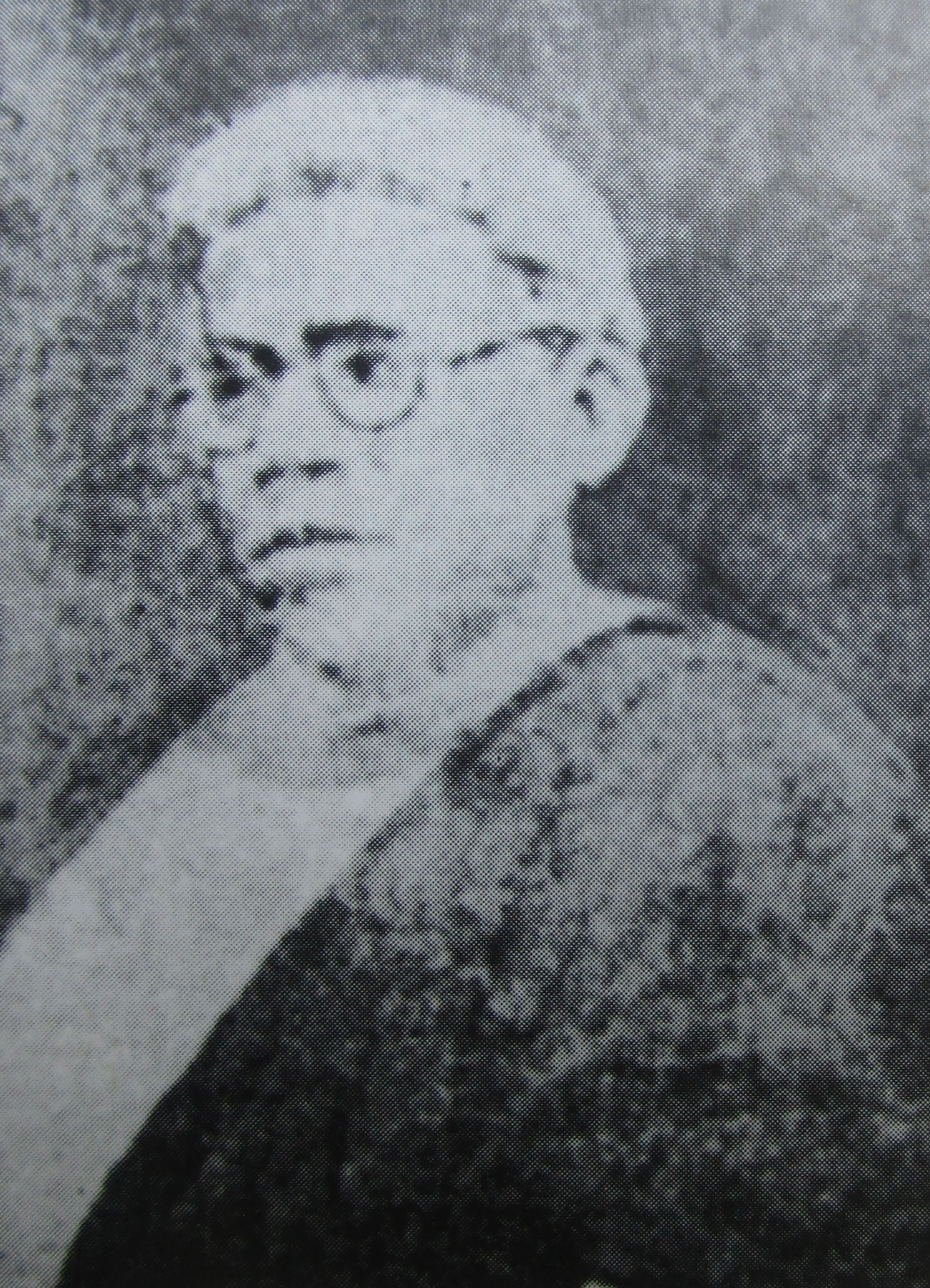
Hemchandra Kanungo (Hem Das), an independence activist that received chemical training from anarchists in Europe

In 1905, the first partition of Bengal was implemented by the British Raj, separating the Muslim-majority East Bengal from the Hindu-majority West Bengal, in what was described as a policy of "divide and rule". Spearheaded by Aurobindo Ghose, Pramathanath Mitra and Bipin Chandra Pal, secret societies such as the Anushilan Samiti and Jugantar were established on both sides of the new border, aimed at training Bengalis in self-defense, with the ultimate aim of achieving independence from the British Empire. The Dhaka Anushilan Samiti led by Pulin Behari Das was particularly radical, advocating for political terrorism.

In the wake of an assassination attempt on the Presidency Magistrate Douglas Kingsford, the Alipore Bomb Case was opened, in which a number of members of the Anushilan Samiti were accused of conspiracy to "wage war against the Government". This experience led one of the accused, Sri Aurobindo, to withdraw from political activity in Bengal and moved to Pondicherry, where he dedicated himself to practicing a form of spirituality and philosophy which has been described as "radical anarchism".

Bagha Jatin subsequently rose to the Jugantar leadership and developed a decentralised federated body of loose autonomous regional cells, which began to organize a series of actions throughout Bengal "to revive the confidence of the people in the movement", Jatin undertook the armed robbery of banks using automobiles, 3 years before the similar crime spree committed by the Bonnot Gang. After a number of assassinations attempts against colonial officials, the Governor-General of India Gilbert Elliot-Murray-Kynynmound declared that: "a spirit hitherto unknown to India has come into existence (...), a spirit of anarchy and lawlessness which seeks to subvert not only British rule but the Governments of Indian chiefs..." Jatin was eventually arrested in connection with the Howrah-Sibpur Conspiracy case and immediately suspended armed activity following his acquittal. Nevertheless, further assassinations were undertaken, with members of Dhaka Anushilan Samiti assassinating two police officers in Mymensingh and Barisal.

Despite the repression, the British colonial authorities were unable to stop the revolutionary activity, so they conceded to revert the partition in 1911, reuniting the region under the Bengal Presidency. But many Bengali revolutionaries had already been forced to flee from persecution by the British authorities, one of which was Tarak Nath Das, who joined Har Dayal in attempting organize Indian emigrants and educate them on anarchist ideas, going on to establish the Ghadar Movement.

During World War I, members of the Ghadar movement, Anushilan Samiti and Jugantar attempted to organize a mutiny against British rule. Jugantar seized arms from the Rodda company and used them to commit robberies in Kolkata. During the revolt, Bagha Jatin was killed in a firefight with police, while Anushilan Samiti and Jugantar were caught up in the ensuing repression, which led to the widespread arrest, internment, deportation and execution of Bengali revolutionaries. After the war, the government instituted the Anarchical and Revolutionary Crimes Act of 1919, which extended the state of emergency, allowing the British authorities to carry out the preventive indefinite detention and incarceration without trial of people perceived to be part of the revolutionary movement. This largely drove the Bengali revolutionary movement underground, with many of its leaders fleeing to Burma to escape the repression.

In the 1920s, the non-cooperation movement led by Mohandas K. Gandhi began to gain influence throughout the Indian independence movement, leading many Bengali revolutionaries to renounce violence, at the request of Chittaranjan Das. The Jugantar and Samiti experienced a brief resurgence in 1922, but the Bengal Criminal Law Amendment reinstated emergency powers which curtailed their terrorist tactics. This led to the Samiti gradually disseminating itself into the Gandhian movement, with many of its members joining the Indian National Congress. Other Bengali revolutionaries, such as Sachindra Nath Sanyal and Jadugopal Mukherjee, went on to join the Hindustan Socialist Republican Association.

Attacks by the Bengali revolutionary movement continued into the early 1930s. In April 1930, Surya Sen led a group of revolutionaries in a raid on the police armory in Chittagong, while in December 1930, the Bengal Volunteers launched an attack on the Writers' Building. However, the revolutionary movement largely subsided by 1934, with the Samiti and Jugantar being dissolved shortly after. During the late 1930s, many Bengali revolutionaries became increasingly attracted to Marxism-Leninism, leading to the formation of the Revolutionary Socialist Party from remnants of the Samiti. By this time, anarchist ideas had lost their remaining influence in the Bengali revolutionary movement.

=== Pakistani Bengal ===
In 1947, the Second Partition of Bengal was implemented. East Bengal was brought under the Dominion of Pakistan, while West Bengal became a state of the Republic of India. Much of the East Bengali left-wing regrouped under the Awami League, which was at the forefront of Bengali nationalism and the Bengali language movement, seeking autonomy from West Pakistan. But under the One Unit scheme, East Bengal was further integrated into Pakistan and was renamed to East Pakistan.

Pakistani Bengal went through a period of repression, as the 1958 Pakistani coup d'état instituted the military dictatorship of Ayub Khan, which cracked down on the Bengali left-wing and democratic movements. The socialist Sheikh Mujibur Rahman emerged as the leader of the opposition and launched the Six point movement for greater autonomy in East Pakistan. In 1969, a mass uprising in East Pakistan led to the overthrow of Ayub Khan and an electoral victory for Rahman. But the military's new leader Yahya Khan refused to recognize the results and enforced martial law over East Pakistan. As part of Operation Searchlight, the Pakistani military began to commit a genocide against the Bengali people, killing hundreds of thousands. This provoked the proclamation of Bangladeshi Independence and the beginning of the Bangladesh Liberation War, which resulted in the surrender of Pakistani forces and the independence of the People's Republic of Bangladesh.

=== Independent Bangladesh ===
After the liberation of Bangladesh, Sheikh Mujibur Rahman set about implementing socialism in Bangladesh, seeking to create a society free from exploitation. Much of the country's industrial and financial sector was nationalized, while much of the country's agricultural sector remained in private hands. In 1975, Rahman enacted the Second Revolution, which transformed Bangladesh into a one-party state, merging the Awami League and the Communist Party into the ruling BaKSAL front. However, this state socialist revolution was brought to an abrupt end with the assassination of Sheikh Mujibur Rahman in a coup d'état, which brought the country under a right-wing military dictatorship and saw the dismantling of the government's socialist policies.

The Communist Party participated in the opposition movement to the military rule of Hussain Muhammad Ershad, which finally came to an end in 1990. The restoration of parliamentarism brought with it the renewal of political freedoms for the Bangladeshi left-wing. But this also brought with it a crisis for the Communist Party, which now came to reckon with the Revolutions of 1989 and the collapse of the Eastern Bloc. The party fractured into a number of factions, one of which advocated the dissolution of the Communist Party and the reconstruction of the Bangladeshi left-wing along more democratic and libertarian lines.

In the 2000s, anarchist ideas began to spread throughout the Bangladesh workers' movement, particularly among workers in the tea and garment sectors. The National Garment Workers Federation, which had formed contact with foreign anarcho-syndicalist federations including the Industrial Workers of the World, began to gain more prominence and organized a number of mass strikes among garment workers. But it gradually began to shift away from workers' self-organization and wildcat actions, towards more bureaucratic means of trade union management. The rise of anarcho-syndicalist practices had also led to the formation of the first workers' council among tea workers. This surge of anarcho-syndicalism in the country culminated on May 1, 2014, with the establishment of the Bangladesh Anarcho-Syndicalist Federation (BASF), which has the ultimate aim of creating a society based on liberty, mutual aid, federalism and self-management. The federation is affiliated with the IWA-AIT and is particularly active in organizing tea and garment workers.

In 2019, the organization Auraj was founded. It consists of an anarchist publishing house that is also involved in various social struggles.

== See also ==
- List of anarchist movements by region
- Anarchism in India
