= Auraj =

- অরাজ
- Formation: 2019; 7 years ago
- Location: Bangladesh
- Website: www.auraj.net

Auraj (Bengali: অরাজ, romanized: oraj) is a Bangladeshi anarchist and feminist organization. Founded around 2019, it primarily focuses on translating and publishing anarchist texts while supporting other movements.

== History ==
The group was founded around 2019 in Bangladesh. Its name comes from the corresponding Bengali term, which means "anarchy". By 2019, it was already active, as it was attacked in October 2019 during a long march against gender-based and sexual violence. In 2020, the group organized another march in collaboration with the Bangladeshi Students' Union (BSU) and the Bangladesh Garment Workers Trade Union Centre (GWTUC), which started in Dhaka and went to Noakhali, 150 km from there, where a woman had been tortured, stripped, and filmed by her captors.

Although the group is engaged in these social and feminist struggles, its main activity remains the maintenance of its website and the publication of anarchist resources in Bengali, particularly through translations. Among the authors translated are Mikhail Bakunin, Peter Kropotkin, and Rudolf Rocker.

The group supported and participated in the 2024 Bangladesh quota reform movement. In this context, one of their members intervened in the anarchist media Global May Day. While the movement was ongoing, Auraj called for the protection of the country's ethnic and religious minorities.
