= Toda people =

Ethnic group of Tamil Nadu, India

Toda
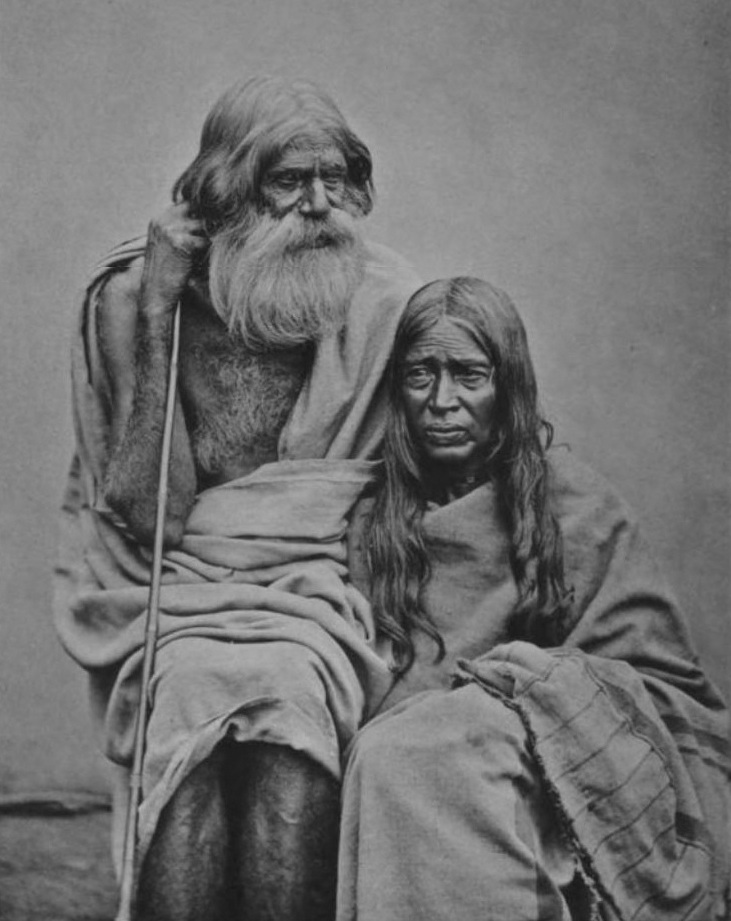
- Elderly Toda Couple, 1873

Total population
- 2,002 (2011 census)

Regions with significant populations
- Nilgiris district, Tamil Nadu

Languages
- Toda

Religion
- Traditional animistic beliefs with Hinduism influence.

Related ethnic groups
- Kota people and other Dravidian speakers

The Toda people are a Dravidian ethnic group who live in the state of Tamil Nadu in southern India. Before the 18th century and British colonisation, the Toda coexisted locally with other ethnic communities, including the Kota, Badaga and Kurumba. During the 20th century, the Toda population has hovered in the range of 700 to 900. A small fraction of the large population of India, since the early 19th century the Toda have attracted "a most disproportionate amount of attention from anthropologists and other scholars because of their ethnological aberrancy" and "their unlikeness to their neighbours in appearance, manners, and customs".

The Toda traditionally live in settlements called mund, consisting of three to seven small thatched houses, constructed in the shape of half-barrels and located across the slopes of the pasture, on which they keep domestic buffalo. Their economy was pastoral, based on the buffalo, whose dairy products they traded with neighbouring peoples of the Nilgiri Hills. Toda religion features the sacred buffalo; consequently, rituals are performed for all dairy activities as well as for the ordination of dairymen-priests. The religious and funerary rites provide the social context in which complex poetic songs about the cult of the buffalo are composed and chanted.

Fraternal polyandry in traditional Toda society was fairly common; this practice has been totally abandoned, as has female infanticide. During the last quarter of the 20th century, some Toda pasture land was lost due to outsiders using it for agriculture or afforestation by the State Government of Tamil Nadu. This has threatened to undermine Toda culture by greatly diminishing the buffalo herds. Since the early 21st century, Toda society and culture have been the focus of an international effort at culturally sensitive environmental restoration. The Toda lands are a part of The Nilgiri Biosphere Reserve, a UNESCO-designated International Biosphere Reserve; their territory is declared UNESCO World Heritage Site.

== Population ==
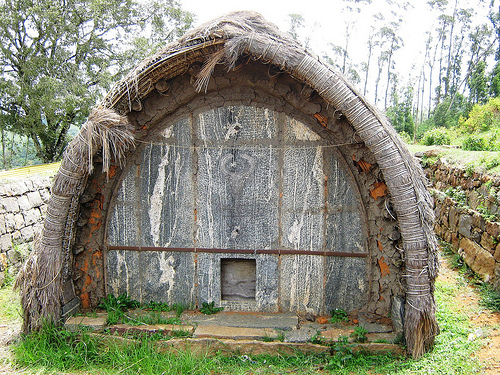
Toda dogles in Nilgiris

According to M. B. Emeneau in 1984, the successive decennial Census of India figures for the Toda are: 1871 (693), 1881 (675), 1891 (739), 1901 (807), 1911 (676) (corrected from 748), 1951 (879), 1961 (759), 1971 (812). In his judgment, these records

"justif[y] [sic] concluding that a figure between 700 and 800 is likely to be near the norm, and that variation in either direction is due on the one hand to epidemic disaster and slow recovery thereafter (1921 (640), 1931 (597), 1941 (630)) or on the other hand to an excess of double enumeration (suggested already by census officers for 1901 and 1911, and possibly for 1951). Another factor in the uncertainty in the figures is the declared or undeclared inclusion or exclusion of Christian Todas by the various enumerators ... Giving a figure between 700 and 800 is highly impressionistic, and may for the immediate present and future be pessimistic, since public health efforts applied to the community seem to be resulting in an increased birth rate and consequently, one would expect, in an increased population figure. However, earlier predictions that the community was declining were overly pessimistic and probably never well-founded."

== Culture and society ==
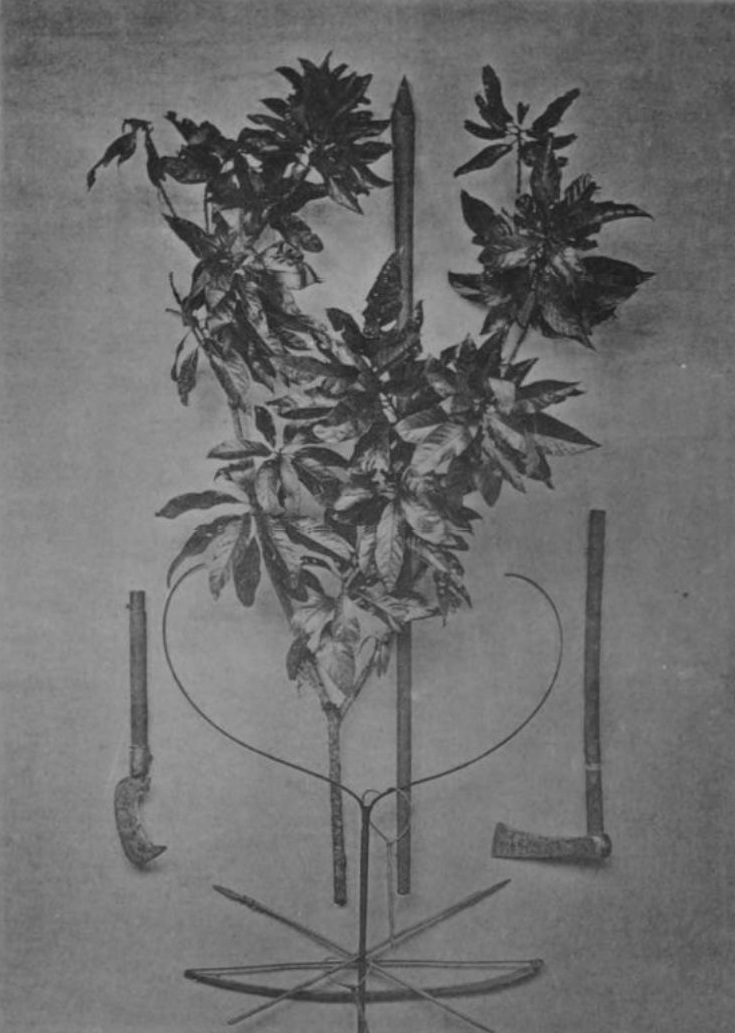
The Tude or sacred bush, weapons, bow & arrow, imitation buffalo horns. Used at weddings & funerals.

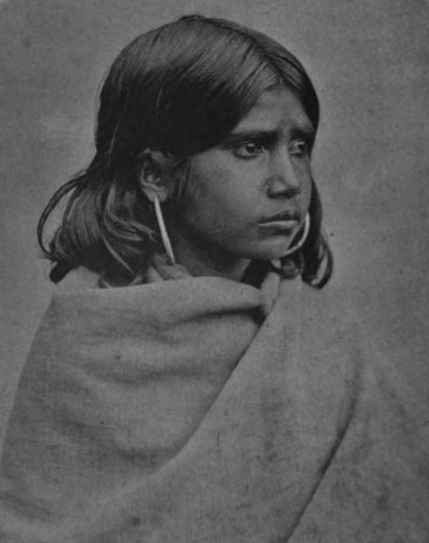
Toda Maiden, ca. 1873

=== Clothing ===
The Toda dress consists of a single piece of cloth, which is worn as a wrap over a dhoti for men and as a skirt for women along with a shawl wrap.

=== Economy ===
Their sole occupation is cattle-herding and dairy-work. Holy dairies are built to store the buffalo milk.

=== Marriage ===
They once practiced fraternal polyandry, a practice in which a woman marries all the brothers of a family, but no longer do so. All the children of such marriages were deemed to descend from the eldest brother. The ratio of females to males is about three to five. The culture historically practiced female infanticide. In the Toda tribe, families arrange contracted child marriage for couples.

=== Houses ===
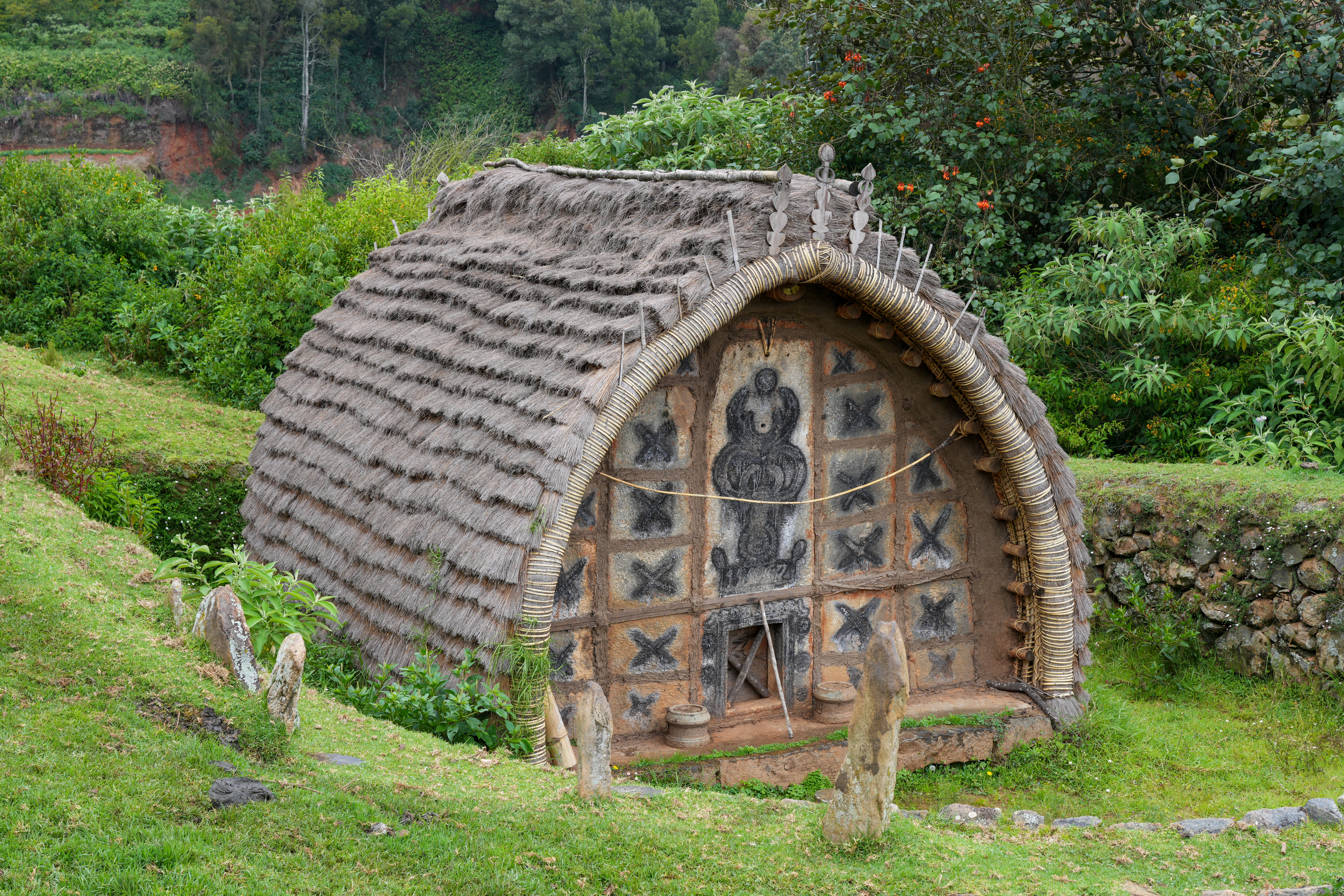
Hut of the Toda tribe of Nilgiris, India. Note the decoration of the front wall, and the very small door.

The Todas live in small hamlets called munds. The Toda huts, called dogles, are of an oval, pent-shaped construction with sliding door. This sliding door is placed inside the hut, and is arranged and fixed on two stout stakes, as to be easily moved back and forth. These huts called dogles are usually 10 feet (3.0 m) high, 18 feet (5.5 m) long and 9 feet (2.7 m) wide. They are built of bamboo fastened with rattan and are thatched. Thicker bamboo canes are arched to give the hut its basic bent shape. Thinner bamboo canes (rattan) are tied close and parallel to each other over this frame. Dried grass is stacked over this as thatch. Each hut is enclosed within a wall of loose stones.

The front and back of the hut are usually made of dressed stones (mostly granite). The hut has a tiny entrance at the front, about 3 feet (91 cm) wide and 3 feet (91 cm) tall, through which people must crawl to enter the interior. This unusually small entrance is a means of protection from wild animals. The front portion of the hut is decorated with the Toda art forms, a kind of rock mural painting.

=== Food ===
The Todas are vegetarians and do not eat meat, eggs that can hatch, or fish. The buffalo were milked in a holy dairy, where the priest/milkman also processed their gifts. Buffalo milk is used in a variety of forms: butter, butter milk, yogurt, cheese and drunk plain. Rice is a staple, eaten with dairy products and curries.

== Religion ==
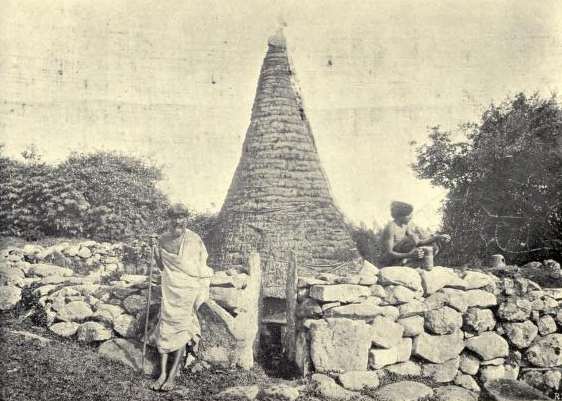
Toda temple -Poovash in the 1900s.

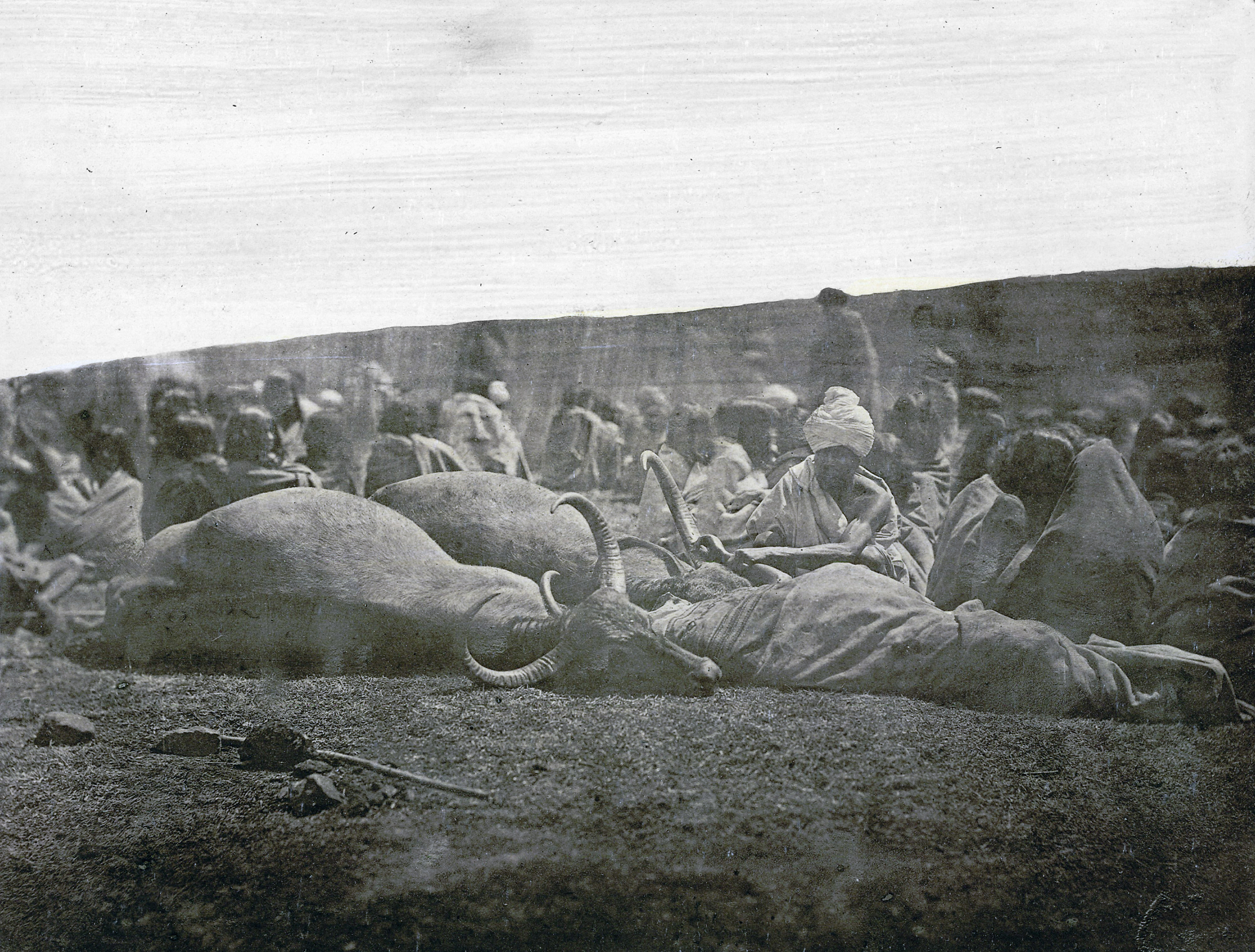
Photograph (1871–72) of a Toda green funeral.

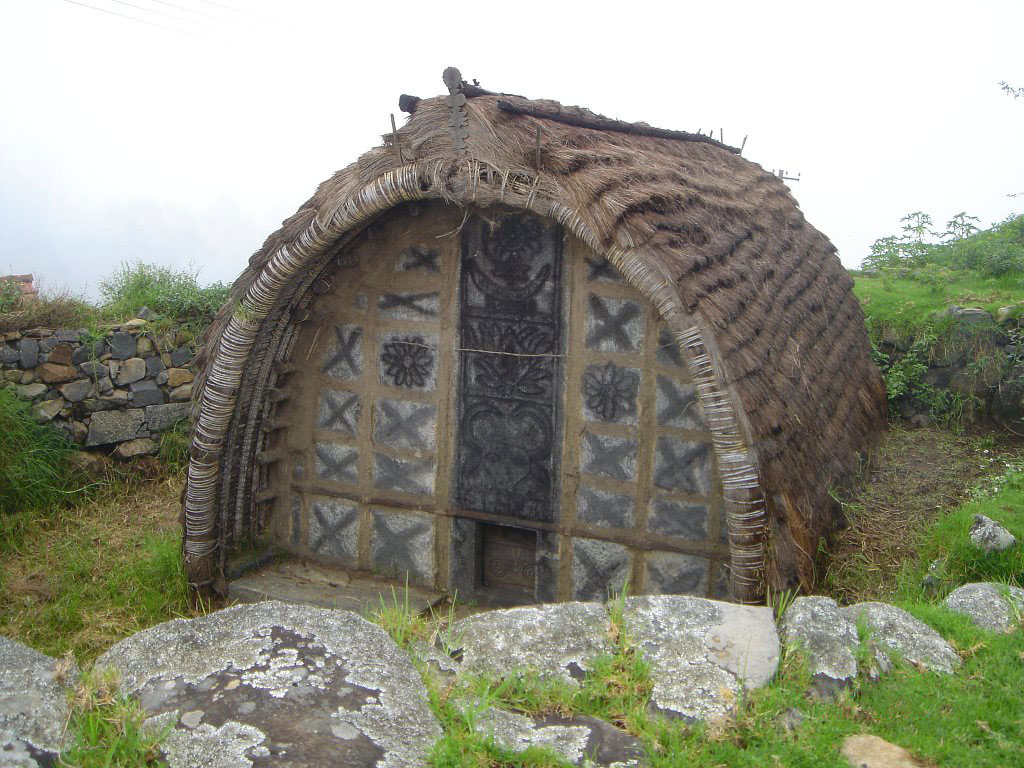
A Toda hut in Muthunadu Mund near Ooty, India.

Toda religious life and practices stem from a pantheon of gods. The heads of this pantheon are the goddess Tökisy and the god of the underworld Ön. These two deities form the basis of many religious practices and rituals, but each Toda clan has their own nòdrochi, a deity seen as that clan’s ruler during the time that the Todas and gods lived together. In total, there are between 1,600 and 1,800 gods. Each Toda settlement, which is known as a mund have two types of temples named as Paluvarsh (parabolic or barrel-vaulted shape which resemble the traditional Toda huts) and Poovarsh (cylindrical walls and a long, conical roof).

According to the Toda religion, Ön and his wife Pinârkûrs went to a part of the Nilgiri hills, known as the Kundahs, and set up an iron bar from one end to the other. Ön stood at one end and pulled buffalos out from the earth, which became the sacred buffalos. Pinârkûrs stood on the other end, and she pulled out the buffalos that would form the ordinary herd. The first Toda man also came from the earth, holding onto the tail of the last buffalo Ön pulled out. He then pulled out a rib from the man and created the first Toda woman.

The mountains and hills of their home region are a large part of their religion for two reasons: the importance of grass for buffalo herds and the belief that the hills are the homes of the gods. There is a belief that the gods lived on the hills prior to the creation of the Todas, and that special meetings would take place on a single hill. Each hill associated with a god features a stone circle called a pun. It is unknown who created the puns, but it seems that the Todas did not due to their lack of traditions associated with the stone monuments.

Toda religious tradition is directly tied to the buffalo herding practices. Every part of the dairy process is ritualized including “the twice daily milking and churning of butter to the great seasonal shifting of pastures, the burning over of the dry pastures, and the giving of salt to the herd.” Dairies take up the role of temples in Toda religion. At the dairies, the milk of the buffalos is separated into two qualities: low grade milk, called tarvali, and high grade milk, called kudrpali. There is not a distinction between what buffalos can produce tarvali or kudrpali other than a sacred bell worn by buffalos used to make kudrpali. Additionally, the Todas practice ritual calf sacrifice. The practice is derived from a story where the god Kwoto tricked the gods into eating the flesh of a slain buffalo calf. Since then, this ceremony has taken place every year.

Funerals in the Toda religion are far more celebratory compared to western funerals. The dead are prepared with slaughtered buffalo to accompany them to the afterworld. The buffalos for this process are chased and captured before slaughter as an opportunity for the men to demonstrate their prowess. People also gather in their best clothes for festivities and dancing. There are specific areas dedicated to funeral ceremonies separated for men and women. A hut is made in these areas where the body is prepared. Due to the celebratory nature of Toda funerals, outsiders are typically invited to participate in the festivities.

In Toda religion, divination exists as a separate entity from the buffalo centric practices. Diviners work in pairs and explain misfortunes that have occurred in the Toda villages like the burning down of a dairy. The reasons typically would be that the one seeking explanation committed some offense or that a sorcerer caused the misfortune. In the case of one committing an offense, the diviner would offer a ritual or prayer to make amends for their offense. In the case of a sorcerer, the diviner would identify which sorcerer cast the spell that caused the misfortune. Information about sorcery and sorcerers is limited as it seems to be a taboo practice in Toda culture. Sorcery is believed to be a familial practice that is passed down from father to son. Toda sorcery is feared by the Todas themselves as well as other tribes like the Badagas.

== Language ==
The Toda language is a member of the Dravidian family. The language is typologically aberrant and phonologically difficult. Linguists have classified Toda (along with its neighbour Kota) as a member of the southern subgroup of the historical family proto-South-Dravidian. It split off from South Dravidian, after Kannada, but before Malayalam. In modern linguistic terms, the aberration of Toda results from a disproportionately high number of syntactic and morphological rules, of both early and recent derivation, which are not found in the other South Dravidian languages (save Kota, to a small extent.)

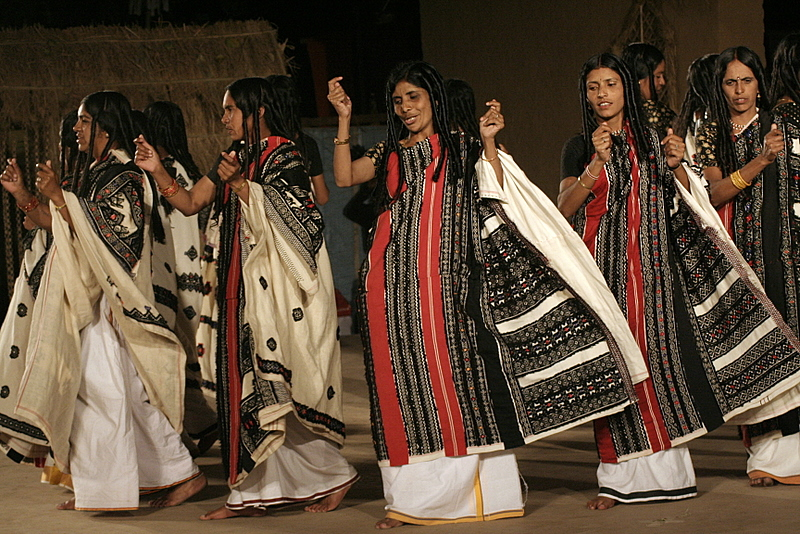
Toda women dancing

== Genetics ==
=== Lactase Persistence ===
The Toda people exhibit one of the highest frequencies of lactase persistence on the Indian subcontinent, with levels comparable to those found in Northern European populations, despite having a steppe ancestry of only around 7.8%. This high prevalence is hypothesized to be the result of strong positive selection. The selection pressure in their mountainous environment very likely favoured individuals with the ability to digest milk, reflecting their long-standing pastoral culture.

== Traditional houses ==
Many Toda abandoned their traditional distinctive huts for houses made of concrete, in the early 21st century, and a movement developed to build the traditional barrel-vaulted huts. From 1995 to 2005, forty new huts were built in this style.

== Embroidery ==
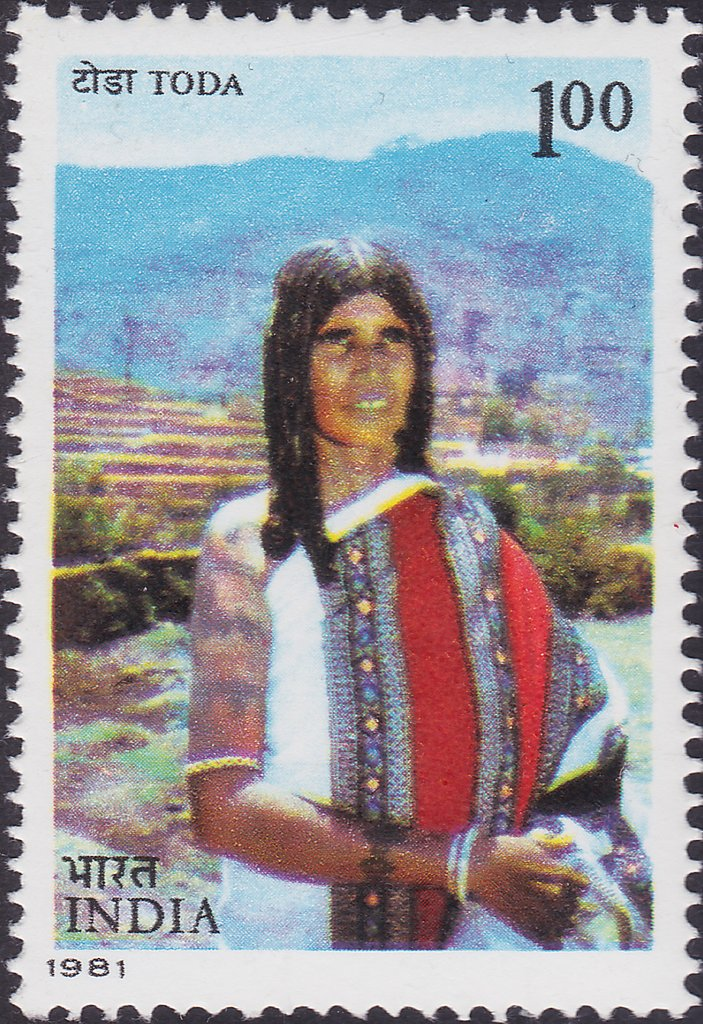
Toda Woman on Indian Postage stamp

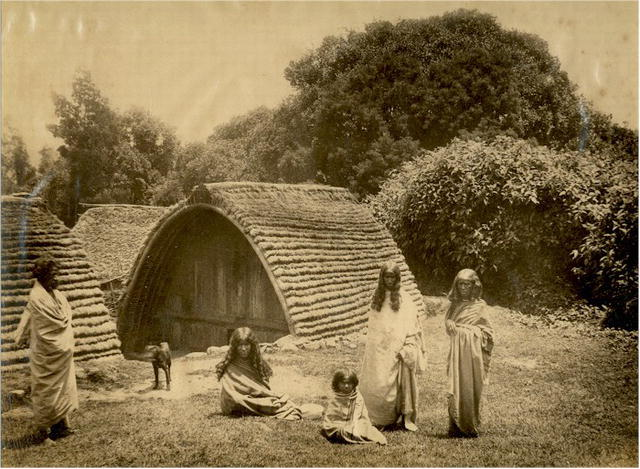
Toda people in front of their hut circa 1870.

Registrar of Geographical Indication gave GI status for this unique embroidery, a practice which has been passed on to generations. The status ensures uniform pricing for Toda embroidery products and provides protection against low-quality duplication of the art.
