= Kota people (India) =

Ethnic group in India

Kotas
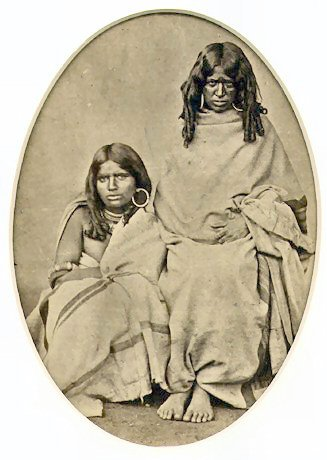
- Kota women in traditional clothes circa 1870s

Total population
- 1203 (1974)

Languages
- Kota language, Tamil

Religion
- Kota Religion, Hinduism

Related ethnic groups
- Toda people and other Dravidian speakers

Kotas, also Kothar or Kov by self-designation, are an ethnic group who are indigenous to the Nilgiri Mountains range in Tamil Nadu, India. They are one of the many tribal people indigenous to the region. (Others are the Todas, Irulas and Kurumbas). Todas and Kotas have been subject to intense anthropological, linguistic and genetic analysis since the early 19th century. Study of Todas and Kotas has also been influential in the development of the field of anthropology. Numerically Kotas have always been a small group, not exceeding 1,500 individuals spread over seven villages for the last 160 years. They have maintained a lifestyle as jacks-of-all-trades such as potters, agriculturalist, leather workers, carpenters, and blacksmiths, and as musicians for other groups. Since the British colonial period they have had greater educational opportunities. This has improved their socio-economic status and they no longer depend on providing their traditional services to make a living. Some anthropologists have considered them to be a specialised caste as opposed to a tribe or an ethnic group.

Kotas have their own unique language that belongs to the Dravidian language family but diverged from South Dravidian subfamily at some time before the common era (BCE). Their language was studied in detail by Murray Barnson Emeneau, a pioneer in the field of Dravidian linguistics. Their social institutions were distinct from mainstream Indian cultural norms and had some slight similarities to Todas and other tribal peoples in neighbouring Kerala and the prominent Nair caste. It was informed by a fraternal polygyny where possible. The religion of the Kota is unlike Hinduism; it worships non-anthropomorphic male deities and a female deity. Since the 1940s, many mainstream Hindu deities also have been adopted into the Kota pantheon and temples of Tamil style have been built to accommodate their worship. Kotas have specialised groups of priests to propitiate their deities on behalf of the group.

== Identity ==
The Indian government classifies the Kota as a scheduled tribe (ST), a designation reserved for indigenous tribal communities throughout India that are usually at a lower socio-economic status than mainstream society. They also have a special status as a particularly vulnerable tribal group (PVTG) based on certain socio-economic and demographic indicators. The Kotas are a relatively successful group that makes its living in varied roles, such as agriculturalists, doctors, bankers and postmasters, for example; they are in both government- and private-sector employment. A few anthropologists and some members of other local communities consider them to be a service caste placed in the Nilgiris for that purpose; Kotas themselves do not believe this. They consider themselves to be original inhabitants of the region, whose provision of traditional artisan skills to other Nilgiri tribes was mutually beneficial and non-servile.

The name Kota is an exonym, a term applied to the group by outsiders; Kotas refer to themselves as 'Kov'. There are a number of meanings attributed to the term, but according to Emeneau, ko-v meant a male potter and ko-ty a female potter. Since the 1930s through the efforts of a Kota school teacher, social reformer and activist named Sulli Kota and his followers, Kotas have transformed their previous traditional relationships away from serving other, so-called high-prestige ethnic groups and upgraded their socio-economic status. They still observe their traditional practices.

== History ==
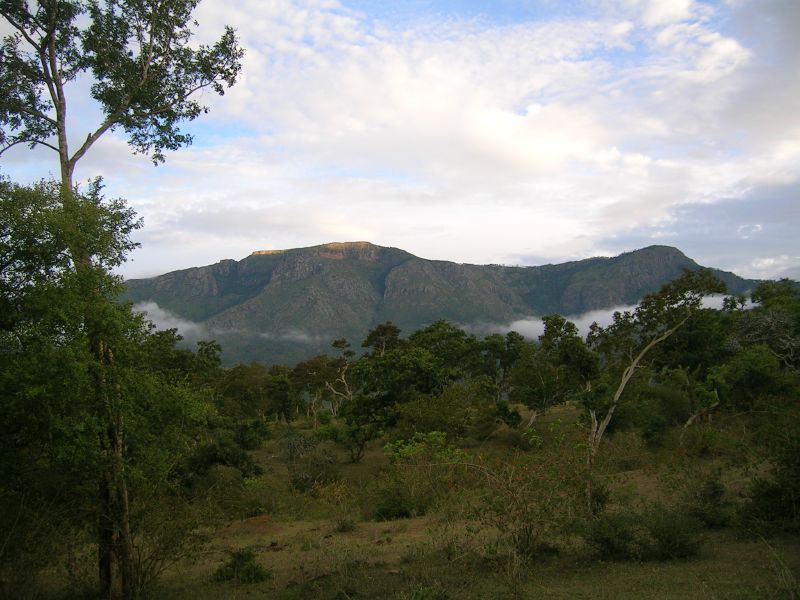
Foothills of the Nilgiris, lower elevation was occupied by Kurumbar and Irulas whereas Kotas occupied the higher elevations.

Although many theories have been put forth as to the origins of Kotas and Todas, none have been confirmed. What linguists and anthropologists agree is that ancestors of both Kotas and Todas may have entered the Nilgiris massif from what is today Kerala or Karnataka in centuries BCE and developed in isolation from the rest of the society. According to Friedrich Metz, a missionary, Kotas had a tradition that alluded to them coming over from a place called Kollimale in Karnatakas. They seem to have displaced the previous Kurumba inhabitants from the higher altitudes to lower altitude infested with malarial mosquitoes.

The Kota tribe shows the maternal haplogroup M at a frequency of 97 per cent, which is one of the highest in India. Within M haplogroup, M2 lineages are common amongst Dravidian-speaking populations of South India. The Kota also demonstrate very low admixture rate from other neighbouring groups. A 2012 study on the haematological profile of Kota showed that a large segment of the population has a low MCV (mean corpuscular volume), with high mean platelet volume (MPV), and red blood cell distribution width (RDW). Together, these are often indicators of inherited haemoglobinopathies such as thalassemias, and sickle cell or other anaemias. However, several other haematological parameters (for example, RBC and platelet counts) that were measured ruled out these conditions. The investigators suggested that the abnormal MCV, MPV and RDW may instead indicate a genetic propensity to a glucose-6-phosphate dehydrogenase deficiency (G6PD deficiency) among this group.

At some point in their history they developed a symbiotic economic relationship with their buffalo-rearing Toda neighbours as service providers in return for Todas' buffalo milk, hides, ghee, and meat. They also had a trading and ritual relationship with Kurumba and Irula neighbours who were cultivators and hunter-gatherers. They specifically used the Kurumbas as their sorcerers and as village guards. The origin myth of Kotas postulates that Kotas, Todas, and Kurumbas were all placed in the Nilagiris area at once as brothers by the Kota god. This symbiotic relationship survived until disturbed by the British colonial officers starting in the early 19th century.

Since the early 19th century, British bureaucrats and both Western and Indian missionaries, anthropologists and linguists have spent an enormous amount of time studying the different ethnic and tribal groups of India; of all, the Todas were the most studied, followed by Kotas. Other groups such as Irulas and various groups of Kurumbars were least studied. The study of the ethnic groups of the Nilgiris was instrumental in the early development of the field of Anthropology. Although most groups lived in peace with each other and had developed an interdependent relationship, taboos and cultural practices were developed to maintain social distance. According to Metz, as the original settlers of the highland, Kurumbars were subject to continuous violence including occasional massacres by the Todas and Badagas. According to Kota informants, they had supplied battle drums during periods of war.

== Society ==
Kotas were settled in seven relatively large nuclear villages interspersed between Toda and Badaga settlements. Six villages were within the Nilgiris district in Tamil Nadu and the seventh one in the Wayanad district in Kerala. Kota villages are known as Kokkal in their language and as Kotagiri by outsiders. Each village had three exogamous clans of similar name. Each clan settled in a street called Kerr or Kerri. Clan members were prohibited from marrying within each within the same village but could from the same clan or any other clan from a non-native village. The relationship between similarly named clans was unknown and no social hierarchy was evident amongst the inter- and intra-village clans.

=== Position of women ===
Women had a greater say in choosing their marriage partners than in any mainstream Indian villages and also participated in many economic activities. They had the right to divorce. They were also exclusively engaged in making pottery. According to early western observers, unlike Toda women, who were friendly towards visitors to their villages, Kota women maintained their distance from outsiders. Wives of Kota priests played an equally important ritual role in religious functions. Women who became possessed to flute music are called Pembacol and were consulted during important village decisions. Women also had specialised roles associated with cultivation, domestic chores and social functions.

=== Food ===
Unlike Todas, Kotas ate meat and were in good physical condition when met by early anthropologists. Their traditional food is Italian millet, a grain important throughout arid regions of India, known in the Kota language as vatamk. Vatamk is served in almost all ceremonial occasions but rice is the preferred daily food. It is served with udk, a sambar-like item made of locally available pulses, vegetables and tamarind juice. Beef is seldom eaten but eggs, chicken and mutton are consumed, when available, along with locally grown vegetables and beans.

=== Governance ===
Prior to colonial era penetration of the Kota area there was little-to-no formal relationships between neighbouring political entities and Kota villages. It is assumed that political entities from Karnataka made forays into the highland, but their control was not permanent. There was no formal differentiation that existed within and outside the village level. Each village had an expectation to meet. The village of Thichgad is famous for its women's song and dance, the funerals are well known in Menad, and the Kamatraya festival and instrumental music are famous in Kolmel. Kota village is led by a village headman called Goethgarn. The Goethgarn from Menad was the head of all the seven villages. Whenever a dispute arose, the Goethgarn will call a meeting known as a kuttim with the village elders and decide the solutions. Within a village, the Goethga-rn and elders decide when festivals are to be held and how to solve problems in the community. Although regular justice is handled through the Indian judicial system, local decisions of Kota cultural requirements are handled by the village kut.

== Religion ==
Kota religion and culture revolved around the smithy. Their major deities are A-yno-r also divided into big or Doda-ynor or small or kuna-yno-r, a father god and Amno-r or mother goddess. Father god is also called Kamati-cvara or Kamatra-ya in some villages. Although there were two male gods, there was only one version of the female goddess. These gods were worshiped in the form of Silver disks at specific temples. Historians Joyti Sahi and Louis Dumont note these deities may have roots in proto-Shaivism and proto-Shaktism Pre-colonial contact, Kotas had a number of religious festivals which continued into the immediate post-colonial-contact period. These included praying to their rain god kakakaku kana- bado or titular deity Kamatra-ya. During the seed sowing ceremony, they used to build a forge and a furnace within the main temple and smiths would make votive item like axes or gold ornaments to the deity. The head priest mundika-no-n and headmen gotga-rn usually belong to the particular family (kuyt) and it was passed from father to son. Mundika-no-n is assisted by the navya-navkaru, through whom the god (so-ym) communicates with the people while being possessed. Te-rka-ran could come from any family but mundika-no-n comes from a specific family in a village.

Kota funeral rites consist of two ceremonies. The first one is called Green funeral and concerns cremation of the body. The second ceremony is called a dry funeral and involves exhumation of buried bones from the first ceremony, followed by sacrifice of semi-wild buffaloes. The second funeral is no longer practiced widely. Kota temples are unique in being run by a variety of people not restricted to original priestly families.

== Language ==
Kotas speak the Kota language or Ko-v Ma-nt and it is closely related to Toda language. It was identified as an independent Dravidian language in as early as 1870s by Robert Caldwell. It diverged from the common South Dravidian stock in years BCE. Kota language speakers became isolated and the language developed certain unique characteristics that were studied in detail and by the prominent Dravidian linguist Murray Emeneau. It is informed by maintenance of words that shows strong affinity to Archaic Tamil. According to Emeneau Kotas have been living in isolation since their separation from the mainstream Tamil speakers in years BCE. Emeneau dates the split to the 2nd century BCE as terminus ante quem ("limit before which") and was unable to date the period earlier than this in which the split may have happened, but it happened after Kannada split from the common Tamil–Kannada stock.

All Nilgiri languages show areal influence and show affinity to each other. Since the reorganization of linguistic states in India, most Kota children study in Tamil at schools and are bilingual in Kota and Tamil. Previously Kotas were multilingual in Kota, Toda and Badaga languages.

=== Kota kinship terms ===
Kota	English
Per-in	Grandfather
Per-av	Grandmother
Ayn	Father
Av	Mother
Ann	Elder brother
Kada-l	Younger brother
Kadas	younger sister
Akken	elder sister
Mamn	Uncle
Ath	Aunt

== See also ==
- Adivasi

== Cited literature ==
- Caldwell, Robert (1875), A comparative grammar of the Dravidian or South-Indian family of languages, Trubner and Co, OCLC 635088088
- Dumont, Louis (1991). "A Folk Deity of Tamil Nad: Aiyanar, the Lord". In T. N. Madan (ed.). Religion in India. Delhi: Oxford University Press. pp. 38–49. ISBN 978-019-563-0923.
- Emeneau, Murray (1980), Language and Linguistic Area: Essays by Murray B. Emeneau, Stanford University Press, ISBN 978-0-8047-1047-3
- Emeneau, Murray (1984), Toda Grammar and Texts, American Philosophical Society, ISBN 978-0-87169-155-2
- Emeneau, Murray (1994), Dravidian Studies: Selected Papers, Motilal Banarsidass, ISBN 978-81-208-0858-4
- Ganesh, Balasubramanian; Rajakumar, Thangarasu; Acharya, Subhendu Kumar; Vasumathy, Sridharan; Sowmya, Sridharan; Kaur, Harpreet (October 2021). "Particularly Vulnerable Tribal Groups of Tamil Nadu, India: A Sociocultural Anthropological Review". Indian Journal of Public Health. 65 (4): 403–409. doi:10.4103/ijph.IJPH_2_21. ISSN 0019-557X. PMID 34975088.
- Ghosh, Alok Kumar (1976). "The Kota of the Nilgiri hills: a demographic study". Journal of Biosocial Science. 08 (1). Cambridge University Press: 17–26. doi:10.1017/S0021932000010415. PMID 956200. S2CID 33682820.
- Hockings, Paul (2008). "All Aboard the Nilgiri Express!—Sustained Links between Anthropology and a Single Indian District". History and Anthropology. 19 (1). Routledge: 1–16. doi:10.1080/02757200802150869. S2CID 162196281.
- Jyothi, M.; Priya, C.; Sanil, R.; Rauf, Arun A. (2012). "Hematological Disorder From The Kota Tribes Of The Nilgiris, India: Novel Research" (PDF). Asian Journal of Biochemical and Pharmaceutical Research. 2 (4): 156–162. Archived from the original (PDF) on 4 March 2016.
- Kalla, Alok Kumar; Joshi, P.C. (2004). Tribal health and medicine. Concept Publishing. ISBN 978-81-8069-139-3.
- Kumar, Dhavendra (2004), Genetic Disorders of the Indian Subcontinent, Springer, ISBN 978-1-4020-1215-0
- Mandelbaum, David (1938). "Polyandry in Kota society". American Anthropologist. 40 (4). University of California, Berkeley: 574–583. doi:10.1525/aa.1938.40.4.02a00030. S2CID 159846446.
- Mandelbaum, David (1941). "Culture Change among the Nilgiri Tribes". American Anthropologist. 43 (1). University of California, Berkeley: 19–26. doi:10.1525/aa.1941.43.1.02a00040.
- Mandelbaum, David (1971), Society in India: Volume 1, University of California Press, ISBN 978-0-520-01623-1
- Metz, Friedrich (1864), The tribes inhabiting the Neilgherry Hills, Basel Mission Press, Mangalore, OCLC 302321001
- Mohanty, P.K. (2003), Development of primitive tribal groups in India, Kalpaz Publications, ISBN 978-81-7835-024-0
- Poduval, R. Vasudeva (1990). Travancore Inscription: A Topographical List. New Delhi: Asian Educational Services. p. 76. ISBN 9788120605558.
- Reddy, K. N.; Balaji Rao, N.S. (1997), Technology, life and livelihood strategies of Tribes of Nilgiris: Past, Present and the Continuum (PDF), S.V. University, Tirupati, archived from the original (PDF) on 22 June 2011
- Sahi, Jyoti (1 July 1990). The child and the serpent: Reflections on popular Indian symbols. Canada: Penguin Group. p. 194. ISBN 978-0140190816.
- Sharma, Shri Pandit Rudrajha (1993). Tattvāloka. Vol. 16. Sri Abhinava Vidyatheertha Educational Trust. p. 246.
- Singh, R. (2004), Social transformation of Indian tribes, Anmol Publishing Ltd. Press, ISBN 978-81-261-0452-9
- Tribhuwan, Robin (2003), Fairs and Festivals of Indian Tribes, Discovery publishing house, ISBN 978-81-7141-640-0
- Watson, Forbes; Kaye, John William (1875). People of India: A series of Photographic illustrations. Vol. 8. India Museum. OCLC 316376538.
- Wilson, Lisa, ed. (2003). The Living and the Dead: Social Dimensions of Death in South Asian Religions. State University of New York Press. ISBN 978-0-7914-5677-4.
- Wolf, Richard Kent (n.d.). "Kota". Countries and Their Cultures. www.everyculture.com.
