= Polygyny in India =

Polygamy is outlawed in India, except for Muslims. While it was not prohibited in Ancient India and was common among aristocrats and emperors, it is believed that it was not a major cultural phenomena. The lack of prohibition was in part due to the separation between land laws and religion (independence of the judiciary), and partially since all of the major religions of India portrayed polygamy in a neutral light.

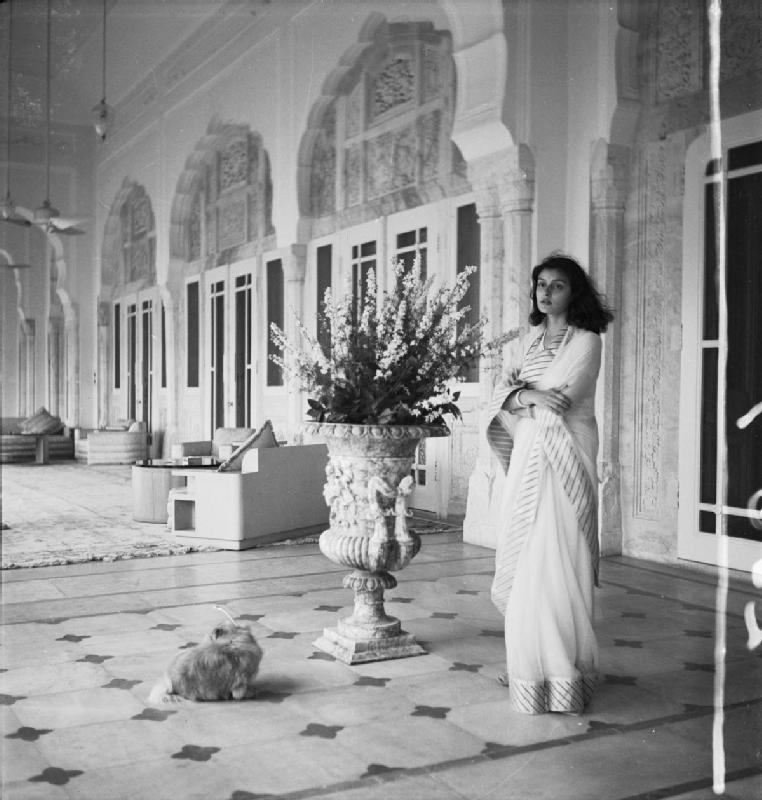
Gayatri Devi, the third wife of Sawai Man Singh II of Jaipur, pictured by Cecil Beaton in 1940

In contrast to Europe, polygamy prevailed in ancient India for rulers and kings. It was common for rulers (for example Bhupinder Singh of Patiala and Fateh Singh of Udaipur and Mewar). Some wealthy individuals (for example Ramkrishna Dalmia, Gajanan Birla and P. Rajagopal) had multiple wives.

The British colonial Empire of India permitted Islamic provinces to allow husbands to have multiple wives. When Maharaja Ranjit Singh was cremated in Lahore, four of his wives and seven concubines took to sati, and their urn-like memorials exist at his Samadhi.

== Legal developments ==
Polygyny

Section 494 and 495 of the Indian Penal Code of 1860, prohibited polygamy for the Christians. In 1955, the Hindu Marriage Act was drafted, which prohibited marriage of a Hindu whose spouse was still living. Thus polygamy became illegal in India in 1956, uniformly for all of its citizens except for Muslims, who are permitted to have four wives and for Hindus in Goa and along the western coast where bigamy is legal.

A polygamous Hindu marriage is null and void. While the punishment specified in Sections 494 and 495 is applicable, it is rare if the first spouse does not have an objection.

== Muslim polygamy ==
Muslims in the rest of the country are subject to the terms of The Muslim Personal Law (Shariat) Application Act of 1937, interpreted by the All India Muslim Personal Law Board.

However, in a judgment in February 2015, the Supreme court of India stated that "Polygamy was not an integral or fundamental part of the Muslim religion, and monogamy was a reform within the power of the State under Article 25".

== Hindu polygamy in modern India ==
Legally the second wife of a Hindu would be a mistress, although religiously and socially she may be considered a wife.

Polygamy among Hindus is sometimes accepted in some rural areas, often with approval by earlier wives. The 2005–06 National Family Health Survey (NFHS-3) found that 2 percent of women reported that their husband had other wives besides herself. Husbands of women with no children are more likely to have multiple wives.

== Christian polygamy in Mizoram ==
In Mizoram state, a Christian sect known as "Lalpa Kohhran Thar" (literal translation "The Lord's New Church"), sometimes known as "Khuangtuaha Pawl" or "Pu Chana Páwl" or "Ziona Pawl" (referring the leaders; pawl means sect or organisation) practices polygamy. Khuangtuaha (1891–1955) formed the sect in 1942, and was supported by his younger brother Chana (1910–1997). Chana introduced polygamous marriage and had seven wives. Khuangtuaha followed suit and married three wives. Chana's son, Ziona (1945–2021), was the most prolific polygamous man of the sect. At the time of his death in 2021, he had 38 wives, 89 children and 33 grandchildren. But polygamy is not practiced freely; men are allowed to marry wives only if they can support them by livelihood, and this is decided by the priests. Only the leaders and their elite lineages are usually able to afford the conditions; thus, it is not widely practiced.

== In popular culture ==
Chand is a social drama film dealing with the story of a childless couple with Balraj Sahni and Meena Kumari in lead roles. The film was based in the year 1955, before the abolition of polygamy.

== See also ==
- Polyandry in India
