= Kurumba =

Kurumba may refer to:

- Kuruba, a caste of Karnataka, India
- Kurumba people (India), an indigenous community in the Indian states of Karnataka, Kerala and Tamil Nadu
- Kurumba Gounder, a caste of Tamil Nadu, India
- Kurumba languages, Dravidian languages spoken by the above communities in India
- Kurumba people (West Africa)
- Kurumba, Panchthar, village in eastern Nepal
- HMAS Kurumba, oil tanker operated by the Royal Australian Navy from 1919 to 1946
- Kurumba Maldives, a resort in the Maldives

== See also ==
- Jenu Kurubas, a tribal group in India
- Kuruva (disambiguation)
- Kuruma (disambiguation)
