= Kousika River =

River in Tamil Nadu, India

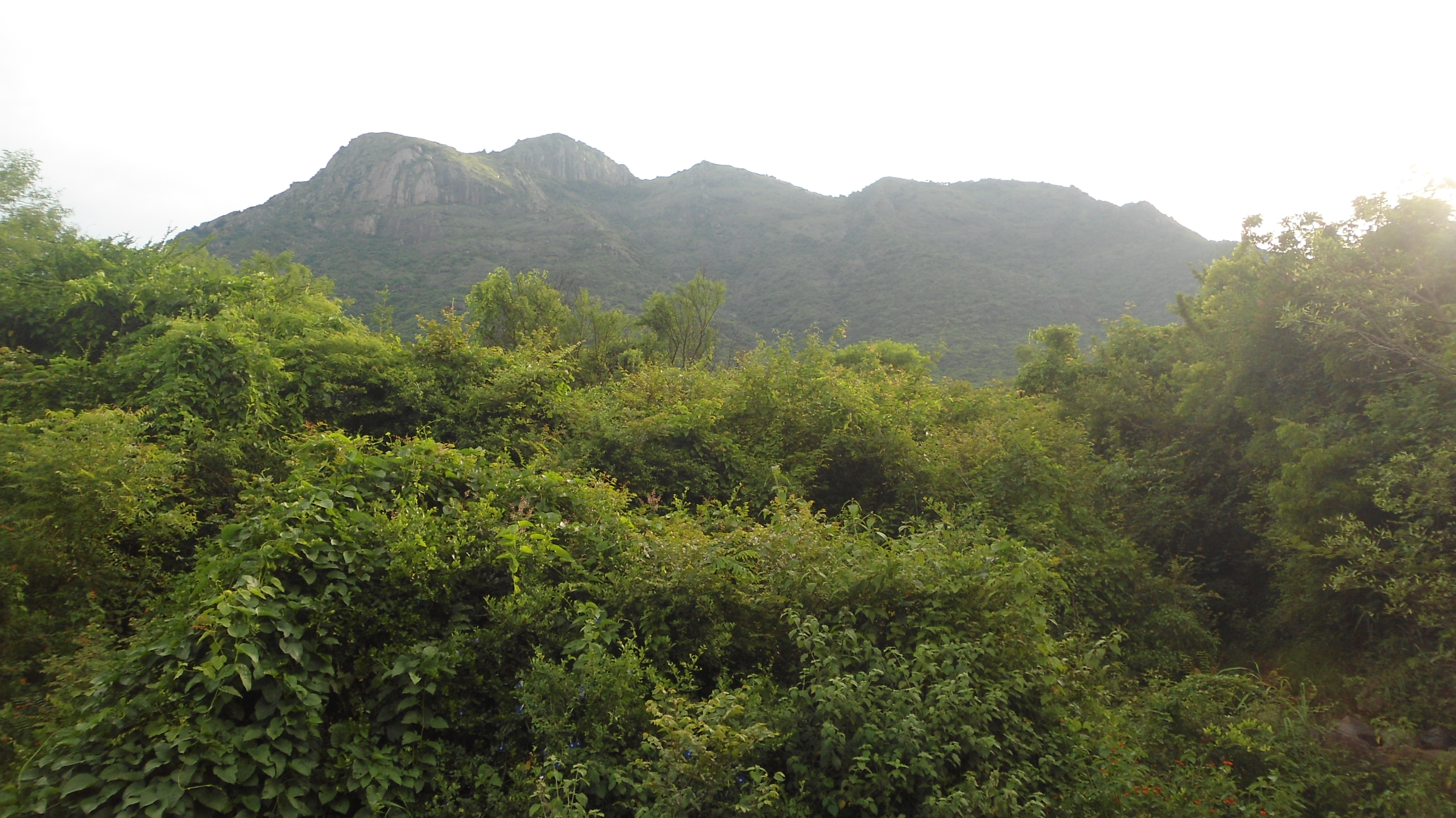
Kurudi Hill (Guru Rishi Hill), Coimbatore, Tamil Nadu, India

Kousika River is a river that runs 52 km in the State of Tamil Nadu in India.

== Geography ==
The Kousika River starts at Kurudi Hill, in Coimbatore. Mel Mudi (5,385 feet), Nadukandaan Poli (5600 feet), and Lambton's Peak (5080 feet) are the three mountain peaks of Guru Rishi Hill .

The Kousika River is 52 km in length. The Bhavani River (approx. 20 km) and the Noyyal River run north and south side of Kousika River in Coimbatore.

=== Kousika Lake ===
Kousika Lake is situated near Kulathupalayam in Coimbatore and Sengalaipalyam in Tirupur district. The village started to rejuvenate this lake in 2018 with the help of the Government of India via groundwater recharge. Nearly 20 villages, 500 acres of agricultural land and approximately 50,000 people benefit from this lake.

=== Sarkarsamakulam Lake (Kondiyam Palayam lake) ===
Sarkarsamakkulam Lake is situated near Kovilpalayam and Kurumbapalayam in Coimbatore. This lake covers nearly 150 acres. It is linked with the Kousika River and Kovilpalayam, known as "Sarkar Samakkulam" and "Kousika Puri."

=== Agrakarasamakulam Lake ===
Agrakarasamakulam Lake is situated near Idikarai, Vaiyampalayam. its outlet flows into the Kousika.

=== Aachan kulam ===
Aachan kulam situated near Neelambur is the largest lake ( more than 250 acres) which presently lies disconnected from Kausika river is the most prominent one.

=== Karunkuttai ===
This small storage between Idikarai and Periyanaickenpalayam (approx 20 acres) has been draining into Kausika river and also been a source of rich soil for local farmers.

== Route ==
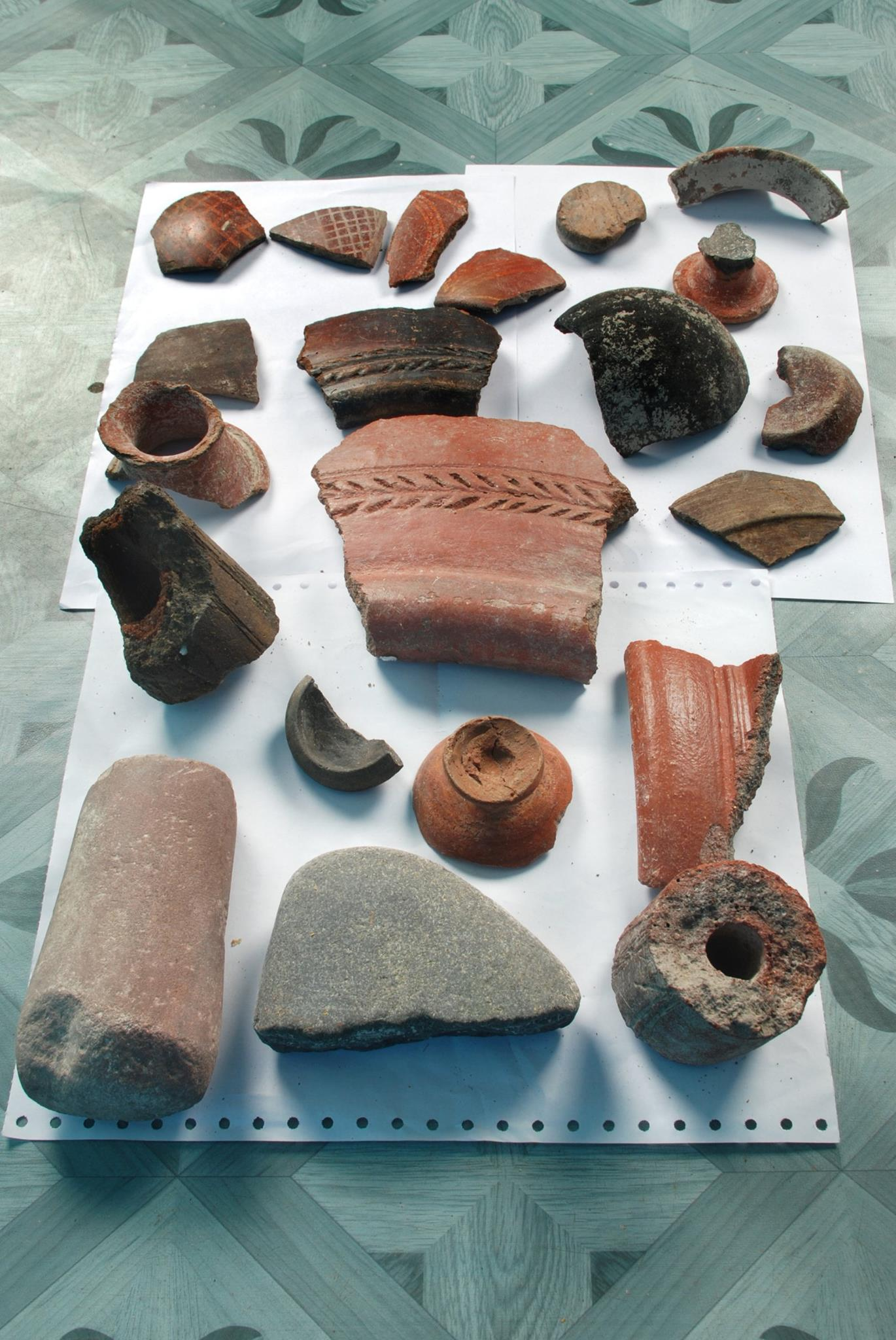
Ancient pottery materials found within the Kousika riverbed

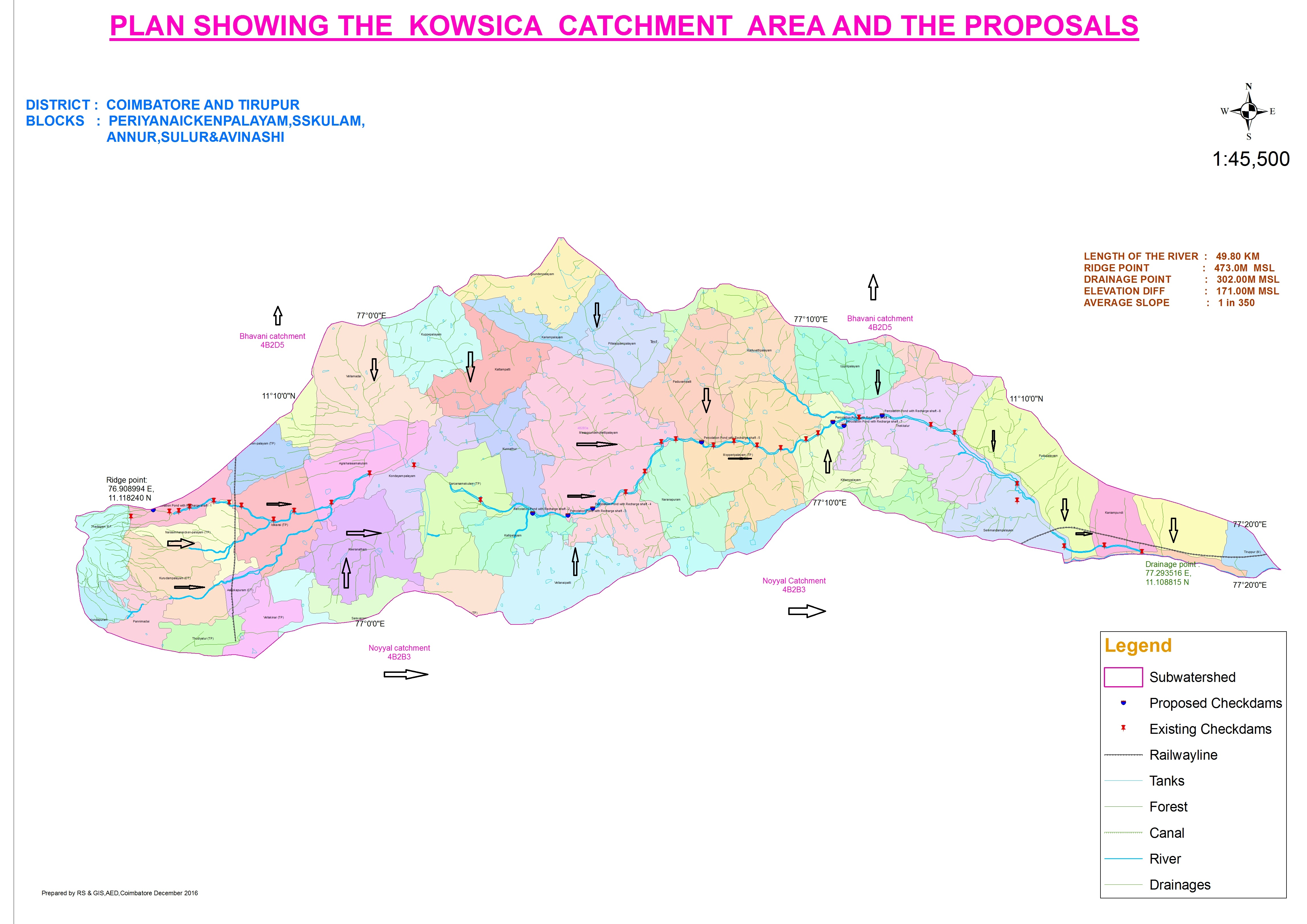
Map of Kousika River

The Kousika River starts from Kurudi Hill in Coimbatore It starts at Thekkupalayam, Narasimmanaikkanpalayam. It flows through NGGO colony, Sengalipalayam on one side and Poochiyur, Narashimhanaickenpalayam, Puduppalayam on 2nd side, straight from CRPF touching thekkupalayam all joining near Idikarai village, then through Athippalaiyam, Vayyampalayam, Kotaipalayam, Keeranam, Agragara Saamarkulam, Kurumbapalayam, Kovilpalayam, Thevenpalayam, Pethanaikanpalayam, Kallipalayam, Pachapalayam, Vadukapalayam, Saalaiyur, Sundamedu, Karichipalayam, Vagarayampalaym, Pappampatti, Kittampalayam, Kolathupalayam, and Thekkalur of Coimbatore District, Thimaniyampalayam, Puthunallur, Eripalayam, Moonukattipalayam, Puthupalayam, Kothapalayam, Smanthankottai, Govindapuram, Vanjipalayam, and finally joins in the Noyyal River at Kaniyampundi Village, Tiruppur.

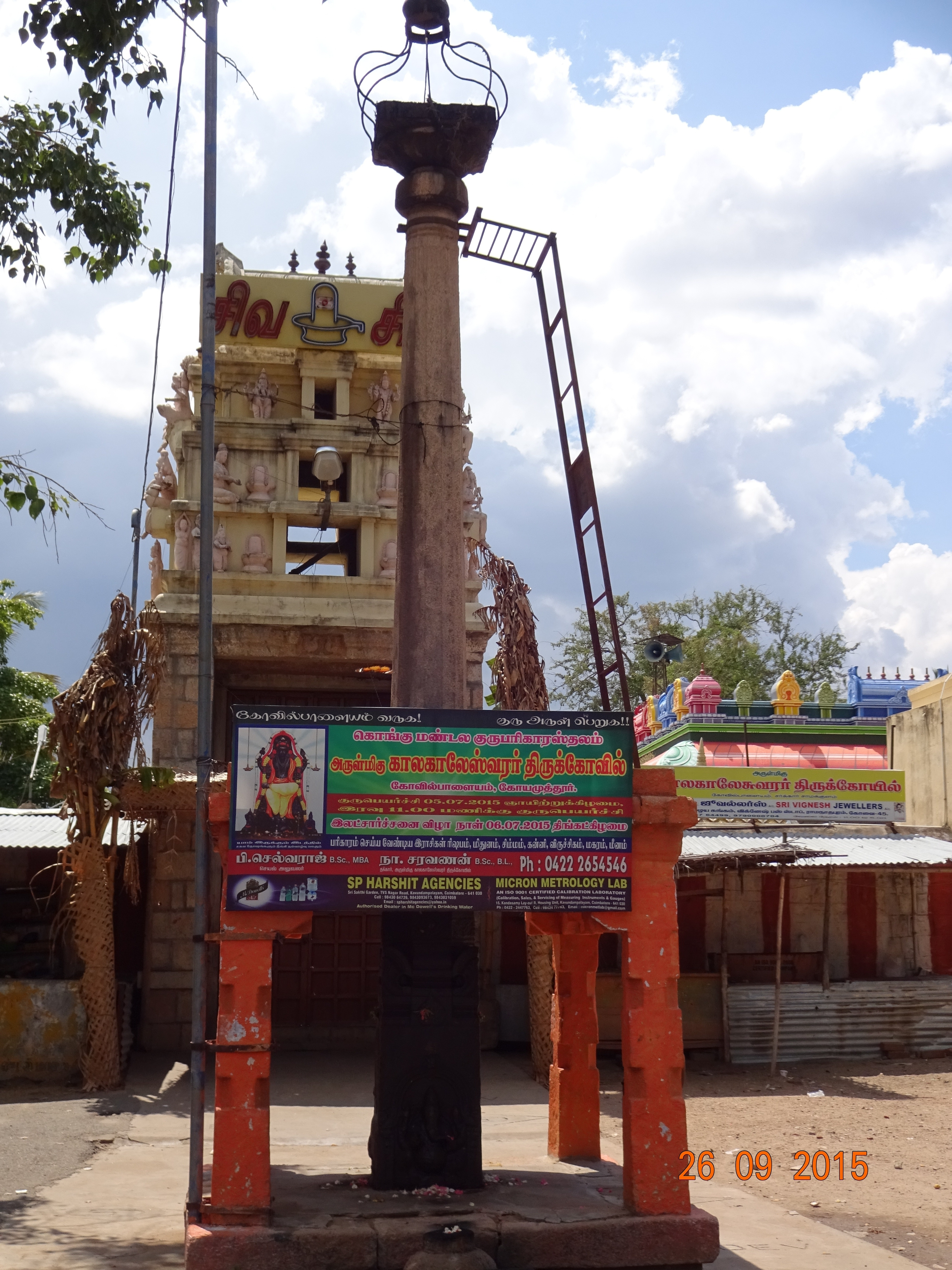
Kalakalishwarar Temple, Kovilpalayam, Coimbatore District, Tamil Nadu, India

The Thalamadal stream and the Thannasi stream of Kurudampalayam, Perumpallam passing through Ramakrishna Vidyalaya (in south border) in Coimbatore all join Kousika.

== History ==
Arunagirinathar talked about "Kousika River" in his work Thiruppugazh (Tamil திருப்புகழ் tiruppukazh "Holy Praise" or "Divine Glory"),

William Lambton surveyed InDIA to determine the shape of the Earth. To honor him, one peak was named Lambton's Peak. T

The name "Kousika" is derived from two sources. The first is that a sage called "Kousika Munivar" lived on the river's shore. The second is that king Kavanagan, who later became Kousikan, ruled this area. Kousika River is also called Vannathan Karai or Perumpallam.

== Reclamation ==
Changes in the waterways and low rainfall affected the flow of the Kousika River. Along the river banks, groundwater sank 2 feet, affecting some 10 million people.

The panchayats of the affected towns agreed to reclaim Kousika River and include it in the Athikkadavu-Avinashi Groundwater Enrichment Scheme.

The Athikadavu Kousika River Development Association and Secretary P.K. Selvaraj is reclaiming the river via the Athikkadavu-Avinashi Groundwater Enrichment Scheme.
