= Kurumbai Aadu =

Kurumbai Aadu (also known as Kurumbadu, Kurumbar Aadu, Coimbatore Sheep) is an indigenous sheep variety of Tamil Nadu traditionally reared by the Kurumba (Kuruba/Kurumbar) pastoral communities The breed has historically been associated with the mullai (pastoral) regions of the Tamil country, particularly in and around the Coimbatore region, the lower slopes of the Nilgiris, and adjoining districts.

== Etymology ==
The Kurumbai or Coimbatore sheep is traditionally referred to in Tamil as Kurumbāḍu or Kurumbar ādu, literally meaning “the sheep of the Kurumbar.” As sheep herding has historically been a principal occupation of the Kurumba community, some scholars have suggested that the ethnonym Kurumban may have originated from this occupational association

== History ==
Gustav Salomon Oppert, a German Indologist described the Kurumbars as a pastoral community and regarded them as among the original inhabitants of the region. According to him, they possessed large flocks of sheep and produced coarse woollen blankets known as kambali or cumblis. Oppert further noted that the term Kurumban in Tamil specifically referred to a Kurumba shepherd, and that the breed of sheep traditionally reared by the community was known in Tamil as Kurumbāḍu. Historians have described the Kurumba communities dispersed across the Indian peninsula as remnants of a once-prominent pastoral group that held influence in the Arcot region during the early centuries of the Common Era Into the early twentieth century, Kurumbars continued to inhabit the mullai (pastoral) tracts of the Madras Presidency and maintained their traditional occupation of kambali weaving Early colonial accounts characterized the Kurumbars as ancient inhabitants of the Dravidian region, including what later came to be known as the Carnatic and Coromandel areas

== Economic Significance ==
Kurumbadu in Coimbatore

Kurumbāḍu sheep are described in early ethnographic and colonial sources as a short-legged, well-fleeced type yielding true wool, which was traditionally used to weave coarse woollen blankets known as kambali or cumblis. The breed has played an important role in the subsistence economy and cultural practices of Kurumba communities and continues to be recognized for its ecological adaptability and local economic significance

In the Coimbatore region, Kurumba communities traditionally rear the Kurumba sheep, a breed characterized by a white body with a black head. Early accounts note that women of the Kurumba households were engaged in weaving the wool into coarse blankets (kambali). The Kurumbar populations of Palladam and Coimbatore were reported to speak Canarese (Kurumba Language). Kurumba communities rearing this sheep are predominantly found in the northern parts of Coimbatore district, as well as in Dharmapuri, Tiruchirappalli, the lower slopes of the Nilgiris, South Arcot, and North Arcot regions

The Coimbatore sheep, is regarded as an important component of the rural economy and ecological sustainability of its native tract. Villages commonly associated with the rearing of this breed include Sulur, Sultanpet blocks of Coimbatore district, Appanaickanpatti, Kalangal, Pappampatti, Kurumbapalayam, Arasur, Pallapalayam, Peedampalli, Tippanur, and Perur, among others

== Kurumba Kambali ==
For centuries, the Kurumba community has been renowned for spinning wool and weaving the distinctive Kurumba Kambali, a coarse woolen blanket valued for its durability and warmth. Early accounts by Francis Buchanan-Hamilton documented the Kurumbas and their blanket-making tradition in the Coimbatore region. Even today, some Kurumba weavers continue to use traditional hand-spinning and weaving techniques with locally sourced Coimbatore wool. Kurumba blankets are typically light yellow to yellowish-grey in color, often featuring red and green borders.

In Manual of the Coimbatore District in the Presidency of Madras (1887), Sir Frederick Augustus Nicholson described Kurumba kambalis as excellent white coarse blankets, selling for ₹2-5 depending on weight (4-8 lb). At the time, the highest price of ₹5 represented more than a month's wages for many working-class laborers, highlighting the blanket's economic value and craftsmanship.

== See also ==
- Kurumba people (India)
- Kurumba Gounder
- Kurumba Languages
