= Hyperstoma =

Scientific classification
- Kingdom: Animalia
- Phylum: Arthropoda
- Class: Insecta
- Order: Coleoptera
- Suborder: Polyphaga
- Infraorder: Elateriformia
- Family: Lampyridae
- Subfamily: Ototretinae
- Genus: Hyperstoma; Wittmer, 1979

Type species
- Hyperstoma marginata Wittmer, 1979

Species
- See text

Genus of beetles

Hyperstoma is a genus of firefly beetles in the family Lampyridae. The genus was considered Monotypic until a second species was described in 2011. The genus is endemic to Sri Lanka.

== Taxonomy ==
The genus is closely related to the genera Lamellipalpus and Lamellipalpodes due to having fused terminal and penultimate terga.

== Description ==
Body length is about 5 to 5.5 mm.

== Species ==
- Hyperstoma marginatum Wittmer, 1979
- Hyperstoma wittmeri Janisova and Bocakova, 2011
