= Oculogryphus fulvus =

Scientific classification
- Domain: Eukaryota
- Kingdom: Animalia
- Phylum: Arthropoda
- Class: Insecta
- Order: Coleoptera
- Suborder: Polyphaga
- Infraorder: Elateriformia
- Family: Lampyridae
- Subfamily: Ototretinae
- Genus: Oculogryphus
- Species: O. fulvus

Binomial name
- Oculogryphus fulvus Jeng, 2007

Species of beetle

Oculogryphus fulvus, is a species of firefly beetles belonging to the family Lampyridae. It is endemic to Vietnam.

Body length of male is 6.0 mm. Body elongate oval and depressed. Brown colored body with black vertex. Elytra brown. Pronotum subparallel-sided. Mesoventrite is broadly V-shaped.
