= Oculogryphus shuensis =

Scientific classification
- Domain: Eukaryota
- Kingdom: Animalia
- Phylum: Arthropoda
- Class: Insecta
- Order: Coleoptera
- Suborder: Polyphaga
- Infraorder: Elateriformia
- Family: Lampyridae
- Subfamily: Ototretinae
- Genus: Oculogryphus
- Species: O. shuensis

Binomial name
- Oculogryphus shuensis Jeng & Engel, 2014

Species of beetle

Oculogryphus shuensis is a species of firefly beetle belonging to the family Lampyridae. It is endemic to China.

Body length of male is 6.7–7.1 mm. Body elongate oval and depressed. Head capsule and antennae black. Thoracic sternites yellowish brown. Elytra black and body yellowish brown.
