= Kuruva (disambiguation) =

Kuruva or Thottada is a coastal village in Kannur district, Kerala, India.

Kuruva may also refer to:

- Kuruva, Malappuram, a village in Malappuram district, Kerala, India
- Kuruva, Karnataka, a village in Davanagere district, Karnataka, India
- Kuruvadweep, an island in Wayanad district, Kerala, India

== See also ==
- Kurumba (disambiguation)
