= Oculogryphus bicolor =

Scientific classification
- Domain: Eukaryota
- Kingdom: Animalia
- Phylum: Arthropoda
- Class: Insecta
- Order: Coleoptera
- Suborder: Polyphaga
- Infraorder: Elateriformia
- Family: Lampyridae
- Subfamily: Ototretinae
- Genus: Oculogryphus
- Species: O. bicolor

Binomial name
- Oculogryphus bicolor Jeng, Branham & Engel, 2011

Species of beetle

Oculogryphus bicolor, is a species of firefly beetles belonging to the family Lampyridae. It is endemic to Vietnam.

Body length of male is 6.2–8.2 mm. Body elongate oval and depressed. Vivid light brown-tan body. Elytra brown. slightly broader elytral epipleura.
