= Brachylampis blaisdelli =

Scientific classification
- Domain: Eukaryota
- Kingdom: Animalia
- Phylum: Arthropoda
- Class: Insecta
- Order: Coleoptera
- Suborder: Polyphaga
- Infraorder: Elateriformia
- Family: Lampyridae
- Subfamily: Ototretinae
- Genus: Brachylampis
- Species: B. blaisdelli

Binomial name
- Brachylampis blaisdelli Van Dyke, 1939

Species of beetle

Brachylampis blaisdelli is a species of firefly in the family Lampyridae. It is found in North America.
