= Kuruma =

Kuruma may refer to one of the following people:

- Mamadu Ture Kuruma, born 1947, Guinea-Bissauan military leader
- Kuruma Samezō, born 1893, Japanese Marxist economist and writer
- Yoshiaki Kuruma, born 1961, Japanese radio announcer

It may also refer to:

- Kuruba, a Hindu caste
- Kuruma Ningyo, a Japanese style of puppetry as performed by company Hachioji Kuruma Ningyo
- Marsupenaeus, also known as kuruma shrimp
- Mount Kuruma, the tallest peak of Mount Kirigamine
- Korma, an Indian curry

== See also ==
- Kurumba (disambiguation)
