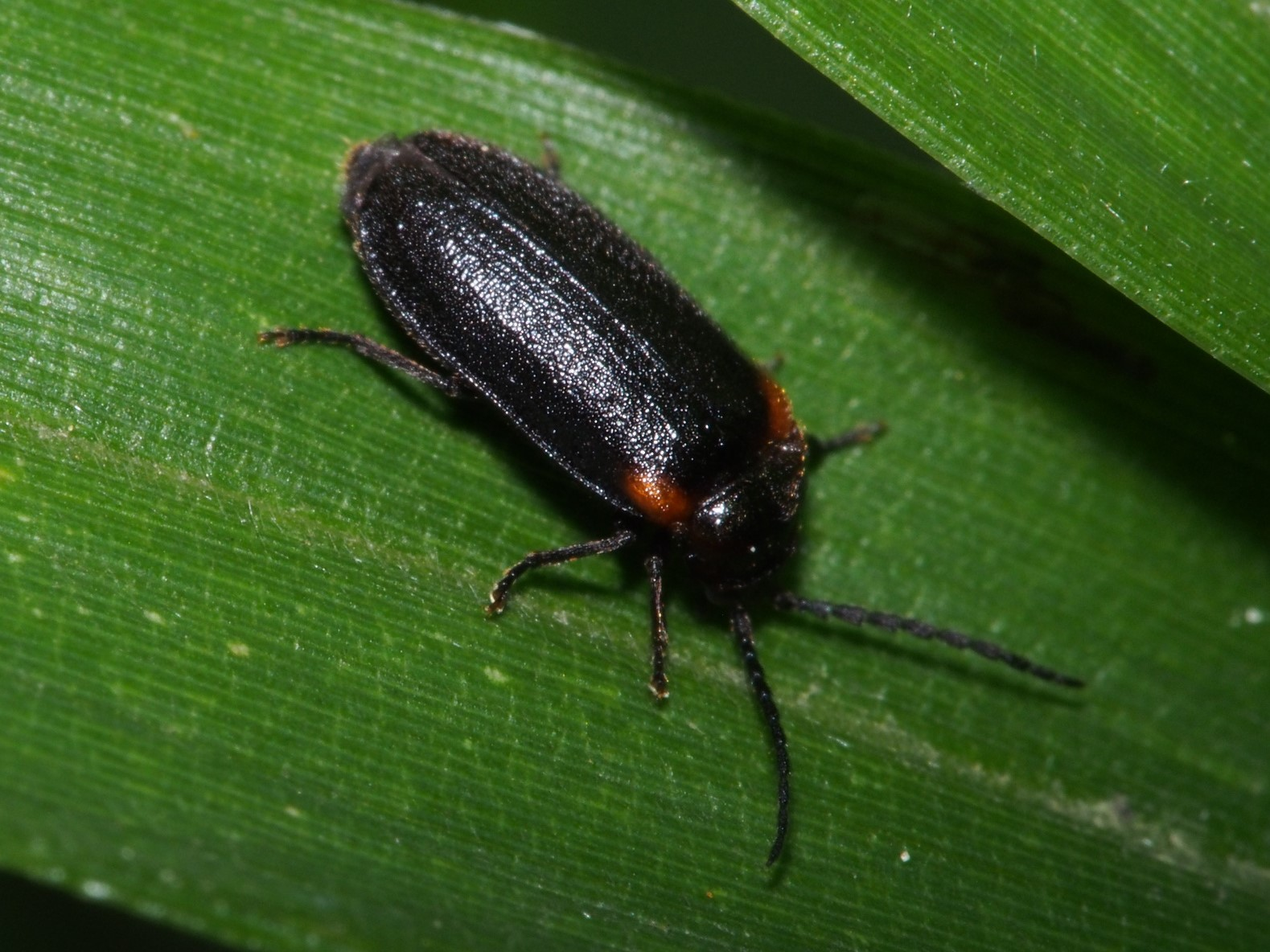

Scientific classification
- Kingdom: Animalia
- Phylum: Arthropoda
- Class: Insecta
- Order: Coleoptera
- Suborder: Polyphaga
- Infraorder: Elateriformia
- Family: Lampyridae
- Genus: Drilaster
- Species: D. axillaris

Binomial name
- Drilaster axillaris Kiesenwetter, 1879

= Drilaster axillaris =

Species of beetle

Drilaster axillaris is a species of firefly in the subfamily Ototretinae.

== Description ==
The luciferase of Drilaster axillaras has been cloned and recombinantly expressed, and has an luminescent emission maximum of 545 nm.

== Range ==
Drilaster axillaris is found in Japan.
