= Hyperstoma wittmeri =

Scientific classification
- Kingdom: Animalia
- Phylum: Arthropoda
- Class: Insecta
- Order: Coleoptera
- Suborder: Polyphaga
- Infraorder: Elateriformia
- Family: Lampyridae
- Genus: Hyperstoma
- Species: H. wittmeri

Binomial name
- Hyperstoma wittmeri Janisova & Bocakova, 2011

Species of beetle

Hyperstoma wittmeri, is a species of firefly beetle endemic to Sri Lanka.

== Description ==
Average length is about 5.2-5.5 mm.
