= Lamellipalpodes kurumba =

Scientific classification
- Kingdom: Animalia
- Phylum: Arthropoda
- Class: Insecta
- Order: Coleoptera
- Suborder: Polyphaga
- Infraorder: Elateriformia
- Family: Lampyridae
- Genus: Lamellipalpodes
- Species: L. kurumba

Binomial name
- Lamellipalpodes kurumba Chakrovorty, Moinudheen & Bhattacharjee, 2025

Species of firefly

Lamellipalpodes kurumba is a rare, non-luminous species of firefly discovered in the Nilgiri Hills of the Western Ghats in Tamil Nadu, India. The Western Ghats are internationally recognized as one of the world's major biodiversity hotspots, characterized by high levels of species richness and endemism. Lamellipalpodes is a genus of non-luminous fireflies within the family Lampyridae, characterized by distinctly broadened terminal labial and maxillary palpomeres. The species was named in honour of the Kurumba, an indigenous tribal community traditionally inhabiting the Nilgiri region.

== Physical description ==
Lamellipapodes kurumba is distinguished by its strongly serrated antennae, a feature not reported in other known species of the genus. Detailed morphological analyses have described the structure of the male genitalia, pronotum, wing venation, and abdominal sclerites, supported by morphometric data and illustrations.

== Etymology ==
The specific epithet kurumba refers to the Kurumba community of the Nilgiris, in recognition of the region where the species was discovered and the longstanding association of the community with the local landscape.{

== Threat to species ==
Lamellipalpodes species discovered in regions traditionally inhabited by the Kurumba community are considered to be at risk of extinction. Although scientific studies on these fireflies remain limited, researchers note that their presence reflects the high biodiversity of the Nilgiri region. Scholars involved in the discovery emphasize that the findings contribute both to ongoing efforts in biodiversity conservation and to broader recognition of the cultural landscapes of the Nilgiris, where indigenous communities such as the Kurumba have long maintained close relationships with the environment.

The Western Ghat mountain range supports a wide variety of ecosystems, including tropical evergreen forests, moist deciduous forests, and montane grasslands, and is home to numerous endemic plants and animals. The occurrence of L. kurumba in this region underscores the ecological significance of the Nilgiris and highlights the importance of conserving habitats that support narrowly distributed and understudied insect species.
