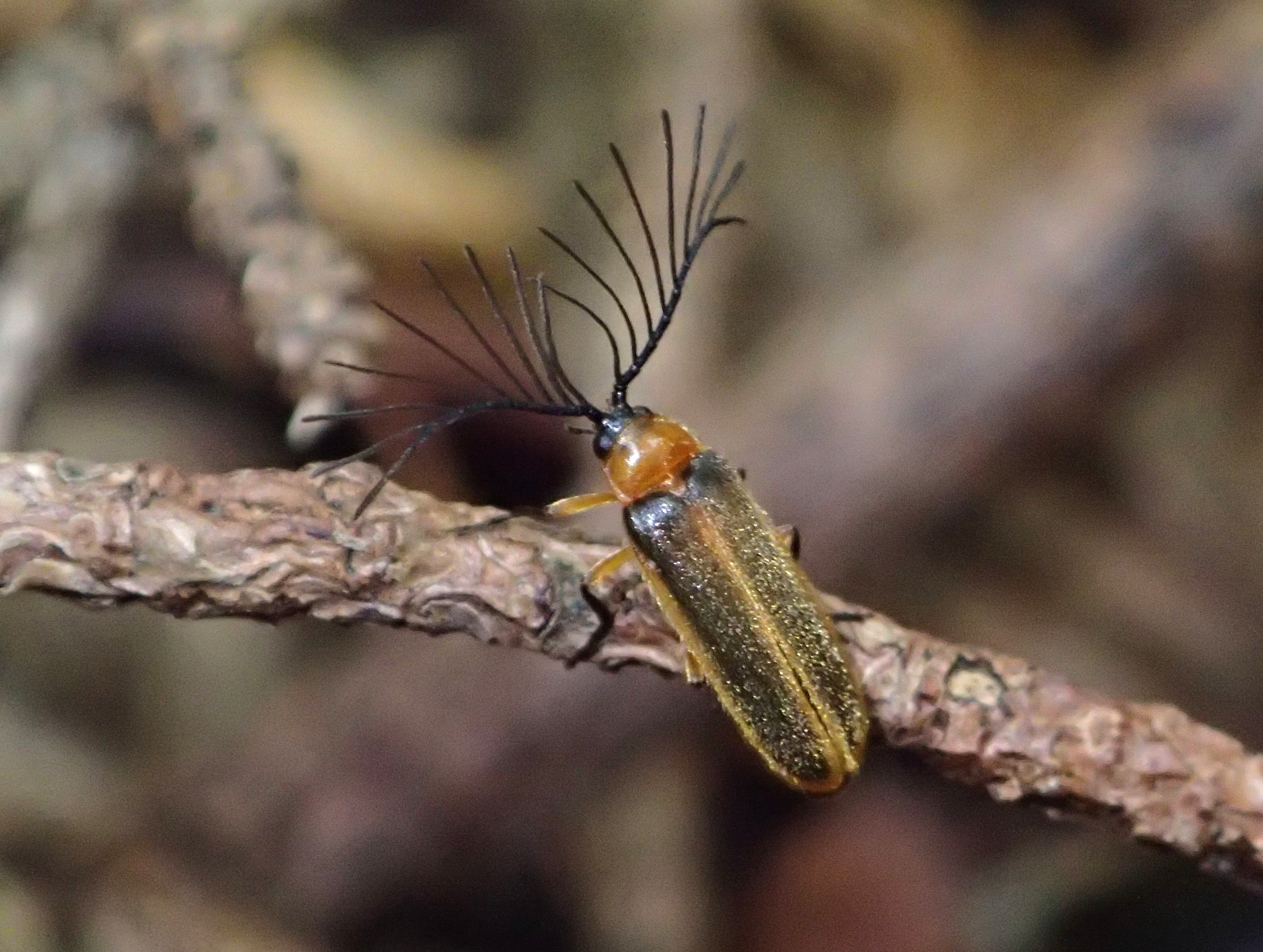
- Stenocladius yoshimasai

Scientific classification
- Kingdom: Animalia
- Phylum: Arthropoda
- Clade: Pancrustacea
- Class: Insecta
- Order: Coleoptera
- Suborder: Polyphaga
- Infraorder: Elateriformia
- Family: Lampyridae
- Subfamily: Ototretinae
- Genus: Stenocladius; Fairmaire, 1878

= Stenocladius =

Genus of beetles

Stenocladius is an Asian genus of fireflies or glow-worms in the subfamily Ototretinae.

== Species ==
BioLib lists the following species:

- Stenocladius azumai Nakane, 1981
- Stenocladius bicoloripes Pic, 1918
- Stenocladius ceylonicus Wittmer, 1979
- Stenocladius chinensis Geisthardt, 2004
- Stenocladius davidis Fairmaire, 1878
- Stenocladius distinctus (Bourgeois, 1909)
- Stenocladius fairmairei (Bourgeois, 1890)
- Stenocladius flavipennis Kawashima, 1999
- Stenocladius horni (Bourgeois, 1905)
- Stenocladius rufithorax Wittmer, 1995
- Stenocladius shirakii Nakane, 1981
- Stenocladius yoshikawai Nakane, 1981
- Stenocladius yoshimasai Kawashima, 1999
