= Kurumbapalayam (Madukkarai) =

Kurumbapalayam (Madukkarai) குரும்பபாளையம்
- Locality
- Interactive map of Kurumbapalayam (Madukkarai)
- Coordinates: 10.914664°N 76.961672°E
- Country: India
- State: Tamil Nadu
- District: Coimbatore District
- Metro: Coimbatore
- Time zone: +5.30GMT
- PIN: 641105

Kurumbapalayam (Madukkarai), is a locality in the Coimbatore district of Indian state of Tamil Nadu. The village is a sub-locality of Madukkarai municipality, and it lies on the southern outskirts of Coimbatore city. Located near the scenic foothills of Western ghats, this village is proximal to the important transportation corridors connecting Tamil Nadu and Keralam state. Due to this, Kurumbapalayam is evolving into a rapidly growing region with increasing commercial activities. The village occupies a strategic location along the Coimbatore- Palakkad Highway.

== Location ==
Kurumbapalayam is located approximately 15 km from the city center of Coimbatore. The village is well connected by road through the nearby National Highway 544 connecting Coimbatore and Palakkad in Kerala. Coimbatore International airport is approximately 23 km from Kurumbapalayam.

Dharmalinga Malai Shiva Temple, a well known hill temple and local pilgrimage site is situated just 5 km from the village. Eachanari Vinayagar Temple, a historic pilgrimage site is situated 3.3 km from the village.

Several Prominent educational institutions are located within a 5 km radius of the village, including Sri Krishna College of Engineering and Technology, VLB Janakiammal College of Engineering and Technology, Peepal Prodigy Senior Secondary School etc

== Manjapallam River and Dam ==
Manjappallam is a small seasonal river that flows through the village of Kurumbapalayam. A check dam, locally known as Kurumbapalayam Anicut has been constructed across the river within Kurumbapalayam to support local water conservation.. The river originates from the foothills near Kovaipudur, and passess through Kurumbapalayam, Madukkarai, Pachapalayam, Kumittipathi, Velanthavalam before entering Kerala. There are approximately 10 check dams built across this river.

== Education ==
Kurumbapalayam Government High school is a Tamil Nadu Government run secondary school in the village, which is rated one of the best performing school. The school has received Perasiriyar K Anbazhagan Award for Best Schools 2023 -24’ by the Tamil Nadu School Education Department in recognition of its academic performance.

The school has large play ground and modernized classrooms which are equipped with CCTV cameras for student safety and campus security.

== Human-Elephant Conflicts ==
Owing to the Kurumbapalayam's proximity to the Western Ghat forest areas, the locality in the past have experienced periodic elephant incursions. In response, Tamil Nadu Forest Department have taken measures to reduce the Human-Elephant conflict and facilitate safe movement of animals. The department introduced early warning systems using Artificial Intelligence (AI)-based cameras as a protective measure.

== Environmental Concerns ==
The locality had faced pollution issues from the neighbouring cement manufacturing factory in Madukkarai. The Tamil Nadu Pollution Control Board (TNPCB) has taken measures to address the pollution. The air quality checks found the pollution concentration ranging from 126-154 particulate matter (PM10)..

== See also ==
- Kurumbapalayam SSKulam
- Kurumba languages
