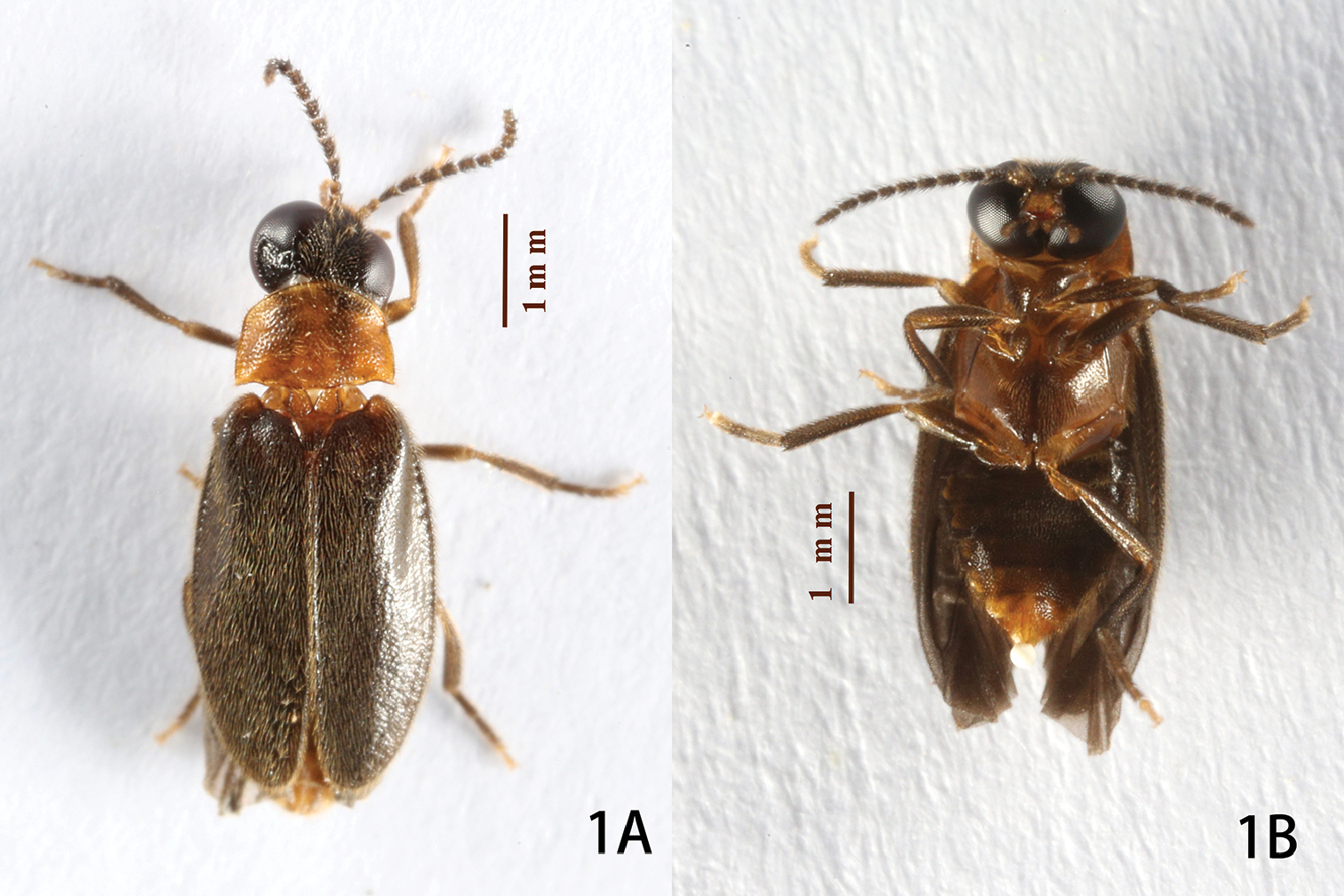

Scientific classification
- Domain: Eukaryota
- Kingdom: Animalia
- Phylum: Arthropoda
- Class: Insecta
- Order: Coleoptera
- Suborder: Polyphaga
- Infraorder: Elateriformia
- Family: Lampyridae
- Subfamily: Ototretinae
- Genus: Oculogryphus
- Species: O. chenghoiyanae

Binomial name
- Oculogryphus chenghoiyanae Yiu & Jeng, 2018

= Oculogryphus chenghoiyanae =

Species of beetle

Oculogryphus chenghoiyanae, is a species of firefly beetles belonging to the family Lampyridae. It is endemic to Hong Kong.

Body length of male is 5.1–5.2 mm and female is 7.8-8.4 mm. Dorsally dark brown to black. head capsule and antennae black. Pronotum orange brown. Compound eyes strongly emarginate posteriorly. Abdomen with eight abdominal ventrites. Female show much pale yellow coloration dorsally with flecked reddish brown markings. Body elongate, more or less cylindrical in female. Abdominal light-emitting organs producing bright yellowish green light.
