= Perumizhalai Kurumba Nayanar =

Personal life
- Born: Kurumba Nayanar Perumizhalai
- Honors: Nayanar saint

Religious life
- Religion: Hinduism
- Philosophy: Shaivism, Bhakti

Perumizhalai Kurumba Nayanar is the 22nd of 63 Nayanar saints of Hinduism. Traditional hagiographies like Periya Puranam (13th century CE) and Thiruthondar Thogai (10th century CE) describe him as a great devotee of the Hindu god Shiva. He was a follower of another Nayanar, Sundarar.

== Hagiographical account ==
Perumilai Kurumba Nayanar was born in the Kurumba community in the village of Perumizhalai (also known as Perumanallur and Devamalai) located in the Pudukottai district of Tamil Nadu. Perumizhalai Kurumba was engaged in his traditional occupation of rearing sheep and making thick blankets from their wool as a devotee of Lord Shiva.

Sundarar has casually mentioned about Perumizhalai, in his Vaippu Sthalangal i.e., places that were mentioned casually in the devotional songs, in Tevaram. The Guru Pooja of Perumizhalai Kurumba Nayanar is celebrated every year in his home town.

Perumizhalai Kurumba Nayanar was a servant of Sivaperuman, a chieftain who governed the Perumizhalai region. The saint used to pack sufficient food and other articles in a woolen Kambli and forward them from the border of the region. The Nayanar was noted for his simple nature and austerity by the people. The saint spent his life with great devotion and faith.

Perumizhalai Kurumba Nayanar was a contemporary with Sundarar, the Chera King Cheraman Perumal and Kotpuli Nayanar who also figure in the 63 Nayanars. Kurumba Nayanar was the admirer of Sundarar and accepted him as his guru. The saint enjoyed in chanting Panchakshara as well as the hymns of Thiruthonda Pathikam. Thiruthonda Pathikam is part of Thiruthonda Thogai composed by Sundarar in praise of 63 Nayanars at Tiruvarur temple. Over a period time Kurumba Nayanar attained Ashta-siddhis, eight yogic powers.

Sundarar proceeded to the sacred land Thiruvanchikulam as a spiritual journey. Using his siddhis, Kurumba Nayanar learned that Shiva had decided to recall Sundarar to His divine abode, granting Sundarar salvation. As the troubled Kurumba Nayanar felt that he could not live without his beloved guru, he left his mortal body with his powers and attained the abode of Shiva, before his guru.

Tamil month Adi – Chithirai star is widely celebrated as Guru Puja Day of Kurumba Nayanar.
