= Attapady Kurumba language =

Southern Dravidian language of India

Attapady Kurumba
- അട്ടപ്പാടി കുറുംബ
- Native to: India
- Native speakers: (1,400 cited 1991 census)
- Language family: Dravidian: Southern; Southern I; Tamil–Kannada; Tamil–Kota; Tamil–Toda; Tamil–Irula; Irula–Muduga; Muduga–Palu; Attapady Kurumba
- Writing system: Malayalam script

Language codes
- ISO 639-3: pkr
- Glottolog: atta1243

Attapady Kurumba (IPA: [ɐʈːɐpːaːɖi kurum(b)ɐ]), also called Pal Kurumba or Palu Kurumba, is an unclassified Southern Dravidian language spoken by a Scheduled tribe of India. It shows only approximately 50% lexical similarity with the other South Dravidian languages named Kurumba, but up to 82% with Muduga and 52% with Kannada Kurumba; Attapady Kurumba, Muduga, and Irula each use their mother tongue when speaking to each other. Thudukki variety of Attapady Kurumba is reportedly most pure.
