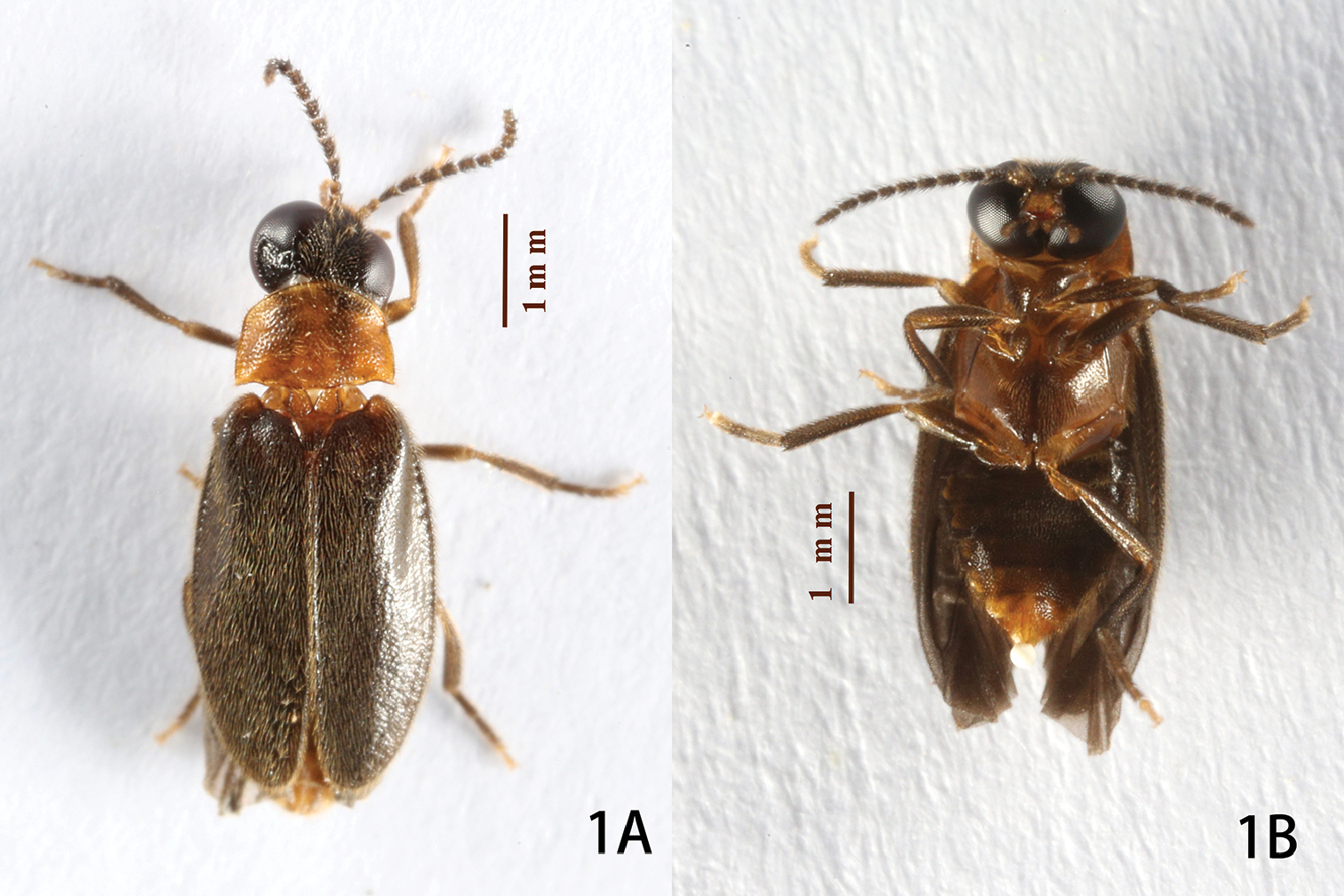
- Oculogryphus chenghoiyanae

Scientific classification
- Domain: Eukaryota
- Kingdom: Animalia
- Phylum: Arthropoda
- Class: Insecta
- Order: Coleoptera
- Suborder: Polyphaga
- Infraorder: Elateriformia
- Family: Lampyridae
- Subfamily: Ototretinae
- Genus: Oculogryphus; Jeng, Engel, and Yang, 2007

Type species
- Oculogryphus fulvus

Diversity
- 4 species

= Oculogryphus =

Genus of beetles

Oculogryphus, is an Asian genus of firefly beetles: it has been placed in the Ototretinae or may be considered incertae sedis. The genus contains 4 species. The type species O. fulvus was discovered from Vietnam.

== Description ==
Antennae filiform. Large compound eyes are deeply emarginated posteriorly. There are eight abdominal ventrites. No photogenic organs. Females of this genus can fluoresce with a blue-green light whole body. Species rely on photic cues for purposes of mating. Body shape of male is elongate oval.

== Species ==
- Oculogryphus bicolor Jeng, Branham & Engel, 2011 - Vietnam
- Oculogryphus chenghoiyanae Yiu & Jeng, 2018 - Hong Kong
- Oculogryphus fulvus Jeng, 2007 - Vietnam
- Oculogryphus shuensis Jeng & Engel, 2014 - China
