= Kovilpalayam =

Kovilpalayam Sarcarsamakulam, Kousigapuri
- Suburb
- Location in Tamil Nadu, India
- Coordinates: 11.135287°N 77.03433°E
- Country: India
- State: Tamil Nadu
- Region: Kongu Nadu
- District: Coimbatore

Government
  - Body: SarkarSamakulam Town Panchayat

Population (2001)
  - Total: 7,728

Languages
  - Official: Tamil
- Time zone: UTC+5:30 (IST)
- PIN: 641107
- Telephone code: 0422
- Vehicle registration: TN 38
- Nearest city: Coimbatore
- Sex ratio: 50:50 ♂/♀
- Literacy: 63%%
- Civic agency: SarkarSamakulam Town Panchayat

Kovilpalayam Kovilpalayam.ogg is a town located in the banks of river Kousika, 17 kilometers from Coimbatore, Tamil Nadu, India, on the Sathyamangalam road (National Highway 209). The Postal name for Kovilpalayam is Sarcarsamakulam or S.S.Kulam in short, there are quite a number of villages/towns in the name of Kovilpalayam, the nearest one to this town with the same name located in Pollachi.

The name Kovilpalayam would have been derived due to its old Hindu temples.

The Kaalakaleshwara Temple dedicated to Lord Shiva, is built by Cholas during the 8th century A.D, lies on the banks of the Kousika River at Kovilpalayam. Dakshinamoorthy statue in this temple is believed to be the largest Dakshinamoorthy statue in Asia. People from all over Tamil Nadu and from other states visit on Pradosham day festivals. Another festival, Sura Samharam, for Lord Muruga, takes place after the week of Deepavali festival which is a very famous festival around the area.

Kavayakaliamman Temple is located at Kavayanpathi, and named after King Kavayan. The temple here is dedicated to the goddess Shakti. The deity is seen holding a Thirisoolam (trident) and Agni (fire) in her two hands. In the prahara of the temple, there are statues of three soldiers sacrificing themselves by cutting their heads with swords. The specialty of the temple is that there is a practice of navagandam (people sacrificing themselves to the goddess). Fridays of the Tamil months of Aadi (July–August), Thai (January–February), as well as Sundays, Full Moon days, new moon days, and Navratri, are auspicious days for the temple.

Other temples include Sakthimaariamman Temple and Veeramachi Amman Temple.

There are lot of Buses that connects Coimbatore Gandhipuram Bus Terminal.
