= Stenocladius horni =

Scientific classification
- Kingdom: Animalia
- Phylum: Arthropoda
- Class: Insecta
- Order: Coleoptera
- Suborder: Polyphaga
- Infraorder: Elateriformia
- Family: Lampyridae
- Genus: Stenocladius
- Species: S. horni

Binomial name
- Stenocladius horni (Bourgeois, 1905)

Synonyms
- Luciola horni Bourgeois, 1905; Selasia (Euptilia) horni Bourgeois, 1905; Stenocladius basalis Pic, 1921

Species of beetle

Stenocladius horni is a species of firefly beetle endemic to Sri Lanka.
