= Hyperstoma marginatum =

Scientific classification
- Kingdom: Animalia
- Phylum: Arthropoda
- Class: Insecta
- Order: Coleoptera
- Suborder: Polyphaga
- Infraorder: Elateriformia
- Family: Lampyridae
- Genus: Hyperstoma
- Species: H. marginatum

Binomial name
- Hyperstoma marginatum Wittmer, 1979

Synonyms
- Hyperstoma marginata Wittmer, 1979 (Missp.)

Species of beetle

Hyperstoma marginatum is a species of firefly beetle endemic to Sri Lanka.

== Description ==
Average length is about 5.0 mm.
