= Kurumba Gounder =

Gounder

- Religions: Hinduism
- Languages: Tamil
- Country: India
- Original state: Tamil Nadu
- Populated states: Tamil Nadu
- Region: South India
- Related groups: Dravidian people

Kurumba Gounder is an Indian caste from the state of Tamil Nadu. The Kurumba/Kurumba Gounder community is considered to be a Most Backward Class (MBC) in Tamil Nadu, as they have been historically recognized as socially and financially well settled. They are found in Kongu region - Dindugal, Theni, Namakkal, Trichy and Coimbatore. The Kurumba Gounder community was previously listed as a sub-sect of Kongu Vellalars, but was later moved to the list of Most Backward Classes. A Hindu ceremony characteristic of the Kurumba Gounder are gatherings at a Mahalakshmi temple for a ceremony of supplication for health and success, during which coconuts are smashed on supplicants' heads.

== Historical people ==
=== Kings and warriors ===
- Kamunda kurumba prabhu (founder and king of Puzhal fort)
- Kottailinga kurumbar (13th century Senji fort king)
- Kurumbaraja (king of Kalvarayanmalai)
- Kurubaradhithar, Queen pottrinangai (rulers of Sathyavedu)
- Sangolli rayanna (18th century freedom fighter in Karnataka)
- Vaanan (Thirumullauvayil king)

=== Saints ===
- Perumizhalai kurumba nayanar (22nd of 63 Nayanmargal saints of Hindusim)
- Kanaka dasa (kannada famous poet)

== See also ==
- Kurumba people (India)
- Kurumba Languages
- Kurumbai Aadu (Coimbatore Sheep)
