= Adithya Institute of Technology =

Engineering college in Tamil Nadu, India

Coordinates: 11.116085°N 77.036476°E

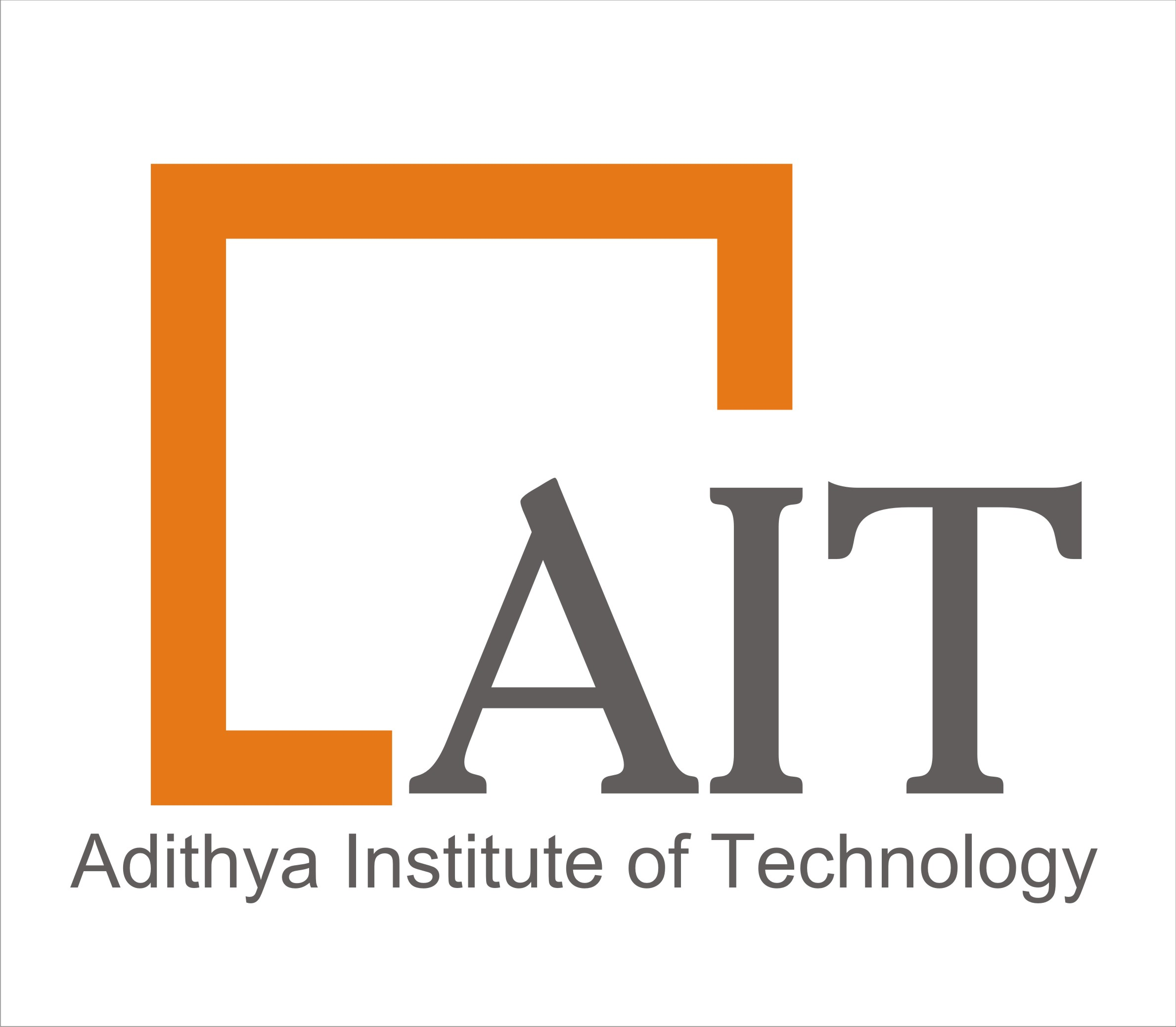
- Other name: AIT
- Type: Autonomous, Private
- Established: 2008
- Location: Coimbatore, Tamil Nadu, India
- Website: adithyatech.edu.in

Adithya Institute of Technology (AIT), located at Coimbatore, Tamil Nadu, India, is an autonomous, private self-financing engineering Institute, adithya Institute of Technology is an engineering college in Coimbatore. The college is approved by AICTE and is affiliated to the Anna University Coimbatore. The college was established in 2008.

== Location ==
The college is located at Sathy Main Road in Kurumbapalayam SSKulam, Coimbatore. It is 12 km (7.5 mi) away from Coimbatore City and nine kilometres away from Coimbatore Civil Aerodrome.

== Academics ==
The college offers five courses in Bachelor of Engineering (B.E.), one course in Bachelor of Technology (BTech), three courses in Master of Engineering (M.E.) and a Master of Business Administration (M.B.A) course. All courses are affiliated to Anna University of Technology, Coimbatore.

== Departments ==
- Department of Mechanical Engineering
- Department of Electronics and Communication Engineering
- Department of Computer Science and Engineering
- Department of Information Technology
- Department of Science and Humanities
- Department of Electrical and Electronic Engineering
- Department of Civil Engineering

== Admission procedure ==
Undergraduate students are admitted based on their 12th standard (higher secondary school) scores. The admissions are done as per government of Tamil Nadu norms through TNEA (Tamil Nadu Engineering Admissions) counselling done by the Anna University and through regulated management seat procedures done by the Consortium of Private Self Financing Arts, Science and Engineering Colleges. In every course, 65% of the seats are filled through counselling and 35% of the seats by management quota.

== National level FIDE rated chess tournament ==
The Department of Physical Education of AIT along with Elite Chess Academy, Rotary Coimbatore North and JCI Cbe Indcity organised a national level FIDE rated chess tournament between 23 December 2008 and 28 December 2008.
