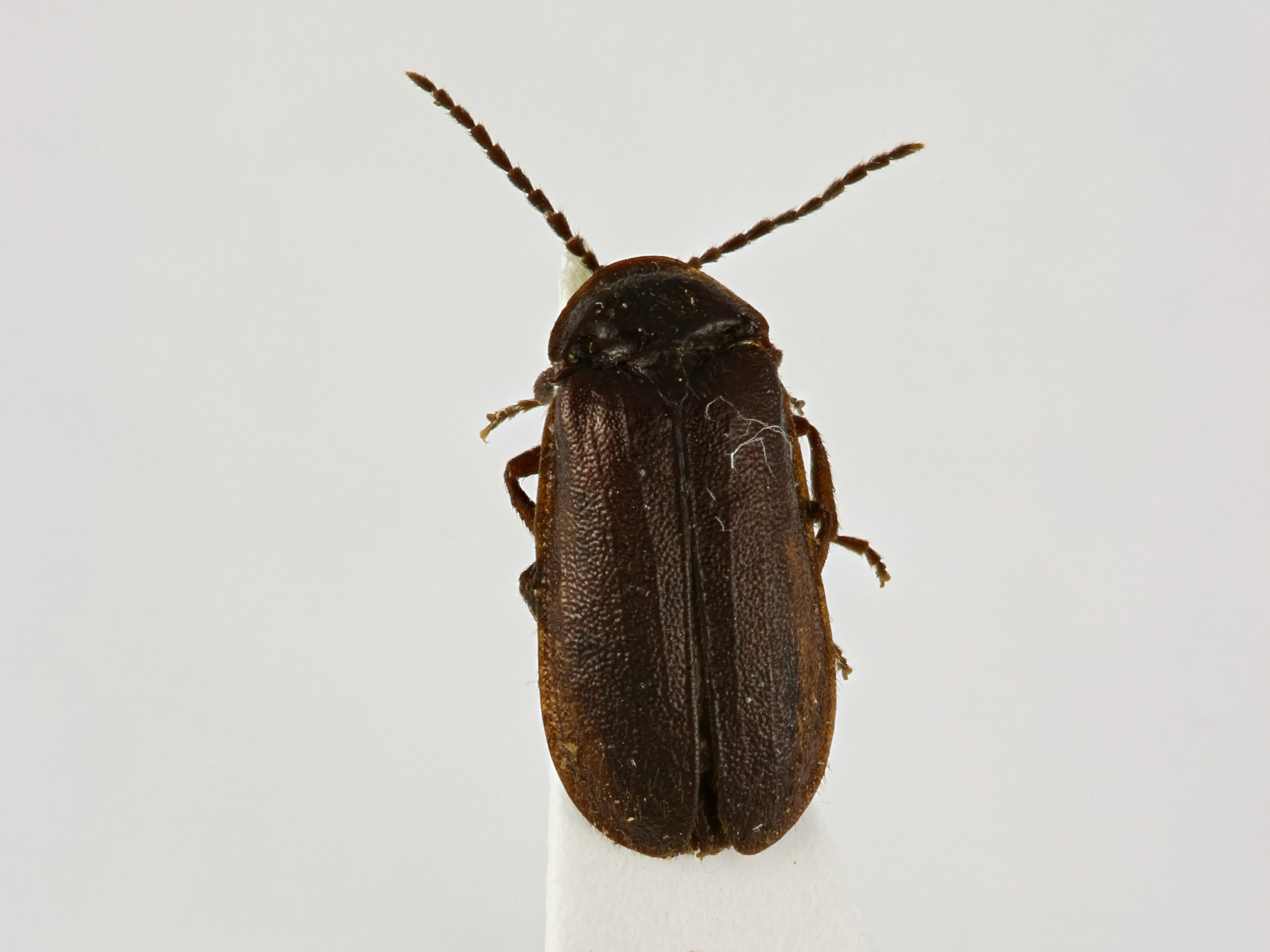
- Drilaster unicolor

Scientific classification
- Domain: Eukaryota
- Kingdom: Animalia
- Phylum: Arthropoda
- Class: Insecta
- Order: Coleoptera
- Suborder: Polyphaga
- Infraorder: Elateriformia
- Family: Lampyridae
- Subfamily: Ototretinae
- Genus: Drilaster; Kiesenwetter, 1879

Synonyms
- List: Apodrilus Janisova & Bocáková, 2013; Kerincius Janisova & Bocáková, 2013; Loksadodrilus Janisova & Bocáková, 2013; Ototreta E.Olivier, 1900

= Drilaster =

Genus of beetles

Drilaster is a genus of beetles belonging to the family Lampyridae. The species of this genus are found in Japan.

== Species ==
The following species are recognised in the genus Drilaster:

- Drilaster agcoensis Janisova & Bocakova, 2013
- Drilaster akakanajai Kawashima, Satou & Satô, 2005
- Drilaster akusekianus Nakane, 1983
- Drilaster albicornis (E.Olivier, 1911)
- Drilaster anomalus Nakane, 1977
- Drilaster apicicornis (Pic, 1911)
- Drilaster atriceps (Pic, 1921)
- Drilaster atricollis Nakane, 1977
- Drilaster atricolor (Pic, 1921)
- Drilaster atronotatus (Pic, 1923)
- Drilaster axillaris Kiesenwetter, 1879
- Drilaster bakeri (Pic, 1921)
- Drilaster basalis (Pic, 1943)
- Drilaster bicolor Satô, 1968
- Drilaster bicoloripes (Pic, 1924)
- Drilaster borneensis (E.Olivier, 1907)
- Drilaster brevecostatus (Pic, 1939)
- Drilaster chapaensis (Pic, 1927)
- Drilaster corporaali (Pic, 1921)
- Drilaster costulatus (Pic, 1921)
- Drilaster curtus (Pic, 1937)
- Drilaster debilis (E.Olivier, 1908)
- Drilaster fastosus (E.Olivier, 1908)
- Drilaster flavicollis Nakane, 1977
- Drilaster flavipennis Nakane, 1977
- Drilaster flavocephalicus Kawashima, Satou & Satô, 2005
- Drilaster fornicatus (E.Olivier, 1900)
- Drilaster fuscicollis Nakane, 1977
- Drilaster giganteus (Pic, 1912)
- Drilaster gravida (E.Olivier, 1900)
- Drilaster impustulata (Pic, 1914)
- Drilaster iokii Satô, 1968
- Drilaster javana (Pic, 1921)
- Drilaster kimotoi Nakane, 1977
- Drilaster kumejimensis Kawashima, Satou & Satô, 2005
- Drilaster lateralis (Pic, 1921)
- Drilaster latipennis (Pic, 1943)
- Drilaster limbata (Pic, 1925)
- Drilaster lusoria (E.Olivier, 1911)
- Drilaster major (Pic, 1921)
- Drilaster medioniger Janisova & Bocakova, 2013
- Drilaster minuta (Pic, 1925)
- Drilaster moultoni (Pic, 1911)
- Drilaster nigra (Pic, 1936)
- Drilaster nigriceps (Pic, 1943)
- Drilaster nigroapicalis Kawashima, Satou & Satô, 2005
- Drilaster occulta (E.Olivier, 1908)
- Drilaster ohbayashii Satô, 1968
- Drilaster okinawensis Nakane, 1977
- Drilaster olivieri (Pic, 1911)
- Drilaster pallidicolor (Pic, 1911)
- Drilaster parvus Nakane, 1977
- Drilaster pectoralis (Pic, 1921)
- Drilaster pendelburyi (Pic, 1943)
- Drilaster plumigera (E.Olivier, 1911)
- Drilaster purpureicollis (Pic, 1911)
- Drilaster robusta (Pic, 1922)
- Drilaster rollei (Pic, 1911)
- Drilaster ruficeps (Pic, 1921)
- Drilaster ruficollis Kawashima, Satou & Satô, 2005
- Drilaster shibatai Satô, 1968
- Drilaster spectabilis (E.Olivier, 1908)
- Drilaster subapicalis (Pic, 1911)
- Drilaster subtilis (E.Olivier, 1908)
- Drilaster subvittatus (Pic, 1943)
- Drilaster sumatrensis (Pic, 1911)
- Drilaster takahashi Nakane, 1977
- Drilaster takashii Nakane, 1977
- Drilaster tenebrosus Kawashima, Satou & Satô, 2005
- Drilaster testaceicollis (Pic, 1921)
- Drilaster testaceolineata (Pic, 1936)
- Drilaster unicolor Lewis, 1895
- Drilaster varicornis (E.Olivier, 1911)
- Drilaster weyersi (E.Olivier, 1900)
- Drilaster yakushimensis Kawashima, 2021
