= Kurumbapalayam SSKulam =

Kurumbapalayam Kurumbapalayam Sarcarsamakulam
- Village Town
- Location in Tamil Nadu, India
- Coordinates: 11°06′45.2″N 77°01′44.3″E
- Country: India
- State: Tamil Nadu
- District: Coimbatore

Population (2001)
  - Total: 5,823

Languages
  - Official: Tamil
- Time zone: UTC+5:30 (IST)
- PIN: 641107
- Vehicle registration: TN 38
- Nearest town: Sarcarsamakulam
- Civic agency: SarcarSamakulam Town Panchayat

Kurumbapalayam SSKulam is a part of Coimbatore city in the state of Tamil Nadu, India. It is located on NH 209 (Sathy Road) between Saravanampatti and Annur.

== Geography ==
Kurumbapalayam SSKulam is situated just 13.5 km away from the heart of the City Gandhipuram. The nerve centre of this place is Sathy Road. Kurumbapalayam SSKulam shares border with Saravanampatti, kondaiyapalayam, Varithaiyangarpalayam, Sarcarsamakulam, Pethanayakanpalayam, and Vazhiampalayam. Additionally, It has direct access to Coimbatore International Airport via Kalappatti.

== Organizations and People ==
Kurumbapalayam has many upcoming industries and educational institutions. Adithya College is one of the famous institutions in kurumbapalayam. Other institutions in this location are SNS College, KV Institute of Management, KV Matriculation School, Sri Guru College of Technology, Adithya Public Matriculation School

== Population ==
According to the 2001 India Census, Kurumbapalayam has an approximate population of 5,000 and is considered densely populated area within Sarcarsamakulam.

== Roads ==
Due to rapid development in the past decade, the government has planned to decongest the roads in Coimbatore City. The State Highways Department has decided to develop the Peelamedu–Kalapatti-Saravanampatty and Kurumbapalayam Road into a Ring road. According to the Highways sources, the 12-km stretch will begin at SITRA Junction in Peelamedu, pass through Kalapatti and connect to Sathyamangalam Road at Saravanampatti, eventually joining Mettuppalayam Road at Thudiyalur. Upon completion of this stretch, the Sathy Road in Ganapathy area will have the option of diverting through either sides i.e. to Avinashi Road or to Mettupalayam Road without going to Gandhipuram.

== Education ==
Major Education Institutions located in Kurumbapalayam SSKulam are:

=== Schools ===
- Government Primary School
- Government Higher Secondary School
- The Indian Public School, Coimbatore
- KV Matriculation Higher Secondary School
- Adithya Public Matric School
- Adithya Global School

=== Colleges ===
- Adithya Institute of Technology (AIT), Coimbatore
- Sri Guru Institute of Technology, Coimbatore
- Info Institute of Engineering, Coimbatore

== See also ==
- Kurumbapalayam (Madukkarai)
- Kurumba languages
