= Brachylampis =

Scientific classification
- Kingdom: Animalia
- Phylum: Arthropoda
- Clade: Pancrustacea
- Class: Insecta
- Order: Coleoptera
- Suborder: Polyphaga
- Infraorder: Elateriformia
- Family: Lampyridae
- Subfamily: Ototretinae
- Genus: Brachylampis; Van Dyke, 1939

Genus of beetles

Brachylampis is a genus of fireflies in the family Lampyridae. There are at least two described species in Brachylampis.

== Species ==
These two species belong to the genus Brachylampis.

- Brachylampis blaisdelli Van Dyke, 1939
- Brachylampis sanguinicollis Van Dyke, 1939
