= Lamellipalpus =

Scientific classification
- Kingdom: Animalia
- Phylum: Arthropoda
- Class: Insecta
- Order: Coleoptera
- Suborder: Polyphaga
- Infraorder: Elateriformia
- Superfamily: Elateroidea
- Family: Lampyridae
- Subfamily: Ototretinae
- Genus: Lamellipalpus; Maulik, 1921

Genus of beetles

Lamellipalpus is an Asian genus of fireflies or glow-worms in the subfamily Ototretinae.

== Species ==
BioLib lists the following species:

- Lamellipalpus atripalpis Brancucci & Geiser, 2009
- Lamellipalpus bombayensis Maulik, 1921
- Lamellipalpus brendelli Wittmer, 1995
- Lamellipalpus constantini Brancucci & Geiser, 2007
- Lamellipalpus flavomarginatus Brancucci & Geiser, 2009
- Lamellipalpus kubani Brancucci & Geiser, 2009
- Lamellipalpus longipalpis Brancucci & Geiser, 2009
- Lamellipalpus manipurensis Maulik, 1921
- Lamellipalpus nepalensis Brancucci & Geiser, 2009
- Lamellipalpus nigripennis (Pascoe, 1887)
- Lamellipalpus pacholatkoi Brancucci & Geiser, 2009
- Lamellipalpus sinuaticollis Brancucci & Geiser, 2009
- Lamellipalpus unicolor Kawashima, 2010
