= Kuruva, Karnataka =

Village in Karnataka, India

Kuruva
- Village
- Location within Karnataka Location within India
- Coordinates: 14°08′35″N 75°39′55″E
- Country: India
- State: Karnataka
- District: Davanagere
- Taluk: Honnali

Government
  - Type: Sarpanch

Area
  - Total: 7.55 km^{2} (2.92 sq mi)
- Elevation: 565 m (1,854 ft)

Population (2011)
  - Total: 1,609
  - Density: 213/km^{2} (552/sq mi)

Languages
  - Official: Kannada
- Time zone: UTC+5:30 (IST)
- PIN: 602024
- STD code: 08188
- Vehicle registration: KA-17

Kuruva is a village in Honnali Taluk, Davanagere District, Karnataka, India. It is located near the district boundary with Shimoga District, about 45 kilometres southwest of the district seat Davanagere, and 10 kilometres south of the subdistrict seat Honnāli. As of 2011, the village had a population of 1,609.

== Geography ==
Kuruva is located in the western bank of Tungabhadra River, with an average elevation of 565 metres above the sea level. The village occupies an area of 755.14 hectares.

== Demographics ==
Per the Indian census data, the number of households in Kuruva was 339 in 2011. Out of the total local population, 808 were male and 801 were female. The overall literacy rate was 73.65%, with 644 of the male residents and 541 of the female residents being literate.
