= Muduga language =

Southern Dravidian language of India

Muduga
- Native to: India
- Native speakers: (3,400 cited 1991 census)
- Language family: Dravidian: Southern; Southern I; Tamil–Kannada; Tamil–Kota; Tamil–Toda; Tamil–Irula; Irula–Muduga; Muduga–Palu; Muduga

Language codes
- ISO 639-3: udg
- Glottolog: mudu1239

Muduga (IPA: [muɖuɡɐ]), also called Mudugar, is a Southern Dravidian language of India influenced by Kannada and Tulu. It is mainly spoken by Muduga tribes in the Attappady valley south of the Nilgiris in Palakkad district, Kerala. It is mutually intelligible with Attapady Kurumba.

== Relevant literature ==
- Rajendran, N. (1978). Description of the language of mudugas (PhD). University of Kerala. hdl:10603/101622.
- Shyam, S. K.; Ravindran, P.N.; Syama, C.G. (2017). Descriptive Grammar of Muduga and Kurumba. Calicut: KIRTADS (Kerala Institute for Research Training & Development studies). pp. 25–106 (Muduga language).
- Kapp, Dieter B. (2019). Muḍuga: Grammatik, Textproben und Wörterbuch. Beiträge zur Kenntnis südasiatischer Sprachen und Literaturen. Vol. 32. Wiesbaden: Harrassowitz Verlag. ISBN 9783447113182. ISSN 0948-2806.
- Arsenault, Paul; Abraham, Binny (2022). "Centralized vowels in Muduga". Journal of South Asian Languages and Linguistics. 9 (1–2): 97–129. doi:10.1515/jsall-2022-2045. S2CID 257233842.
