= Koraga =

Koraga may refer to:

- Koraga people
- Koraga language
