= Thekkalur =

- village
- Interactive map of Thekkalur
- Coordinates: 11°09′16″N 77°12′32″E
- Time zone: UTC+5:30 (IST)
- PIN: 641654
- Area code: +91-4296

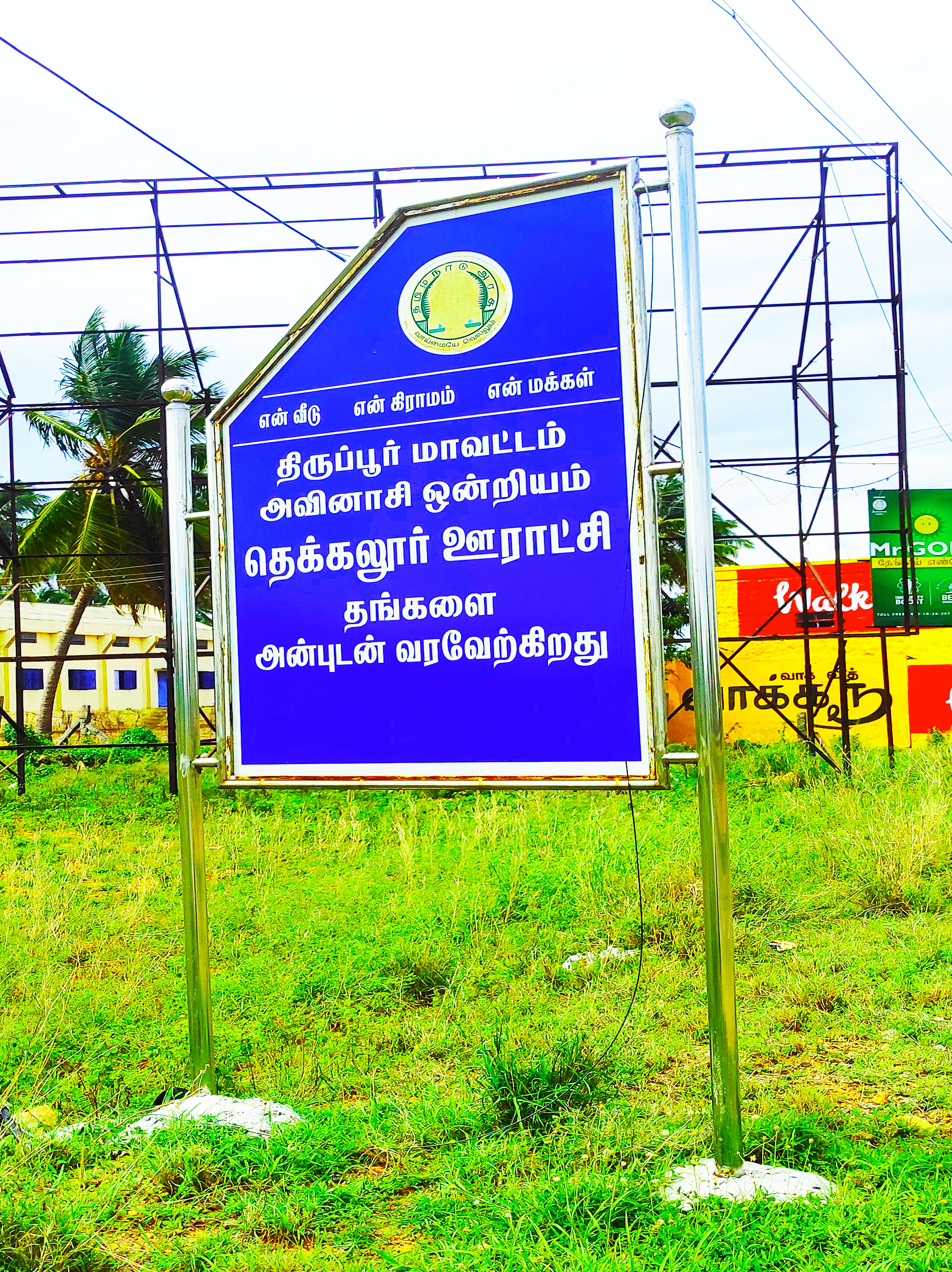
Thekkalur Panchayat

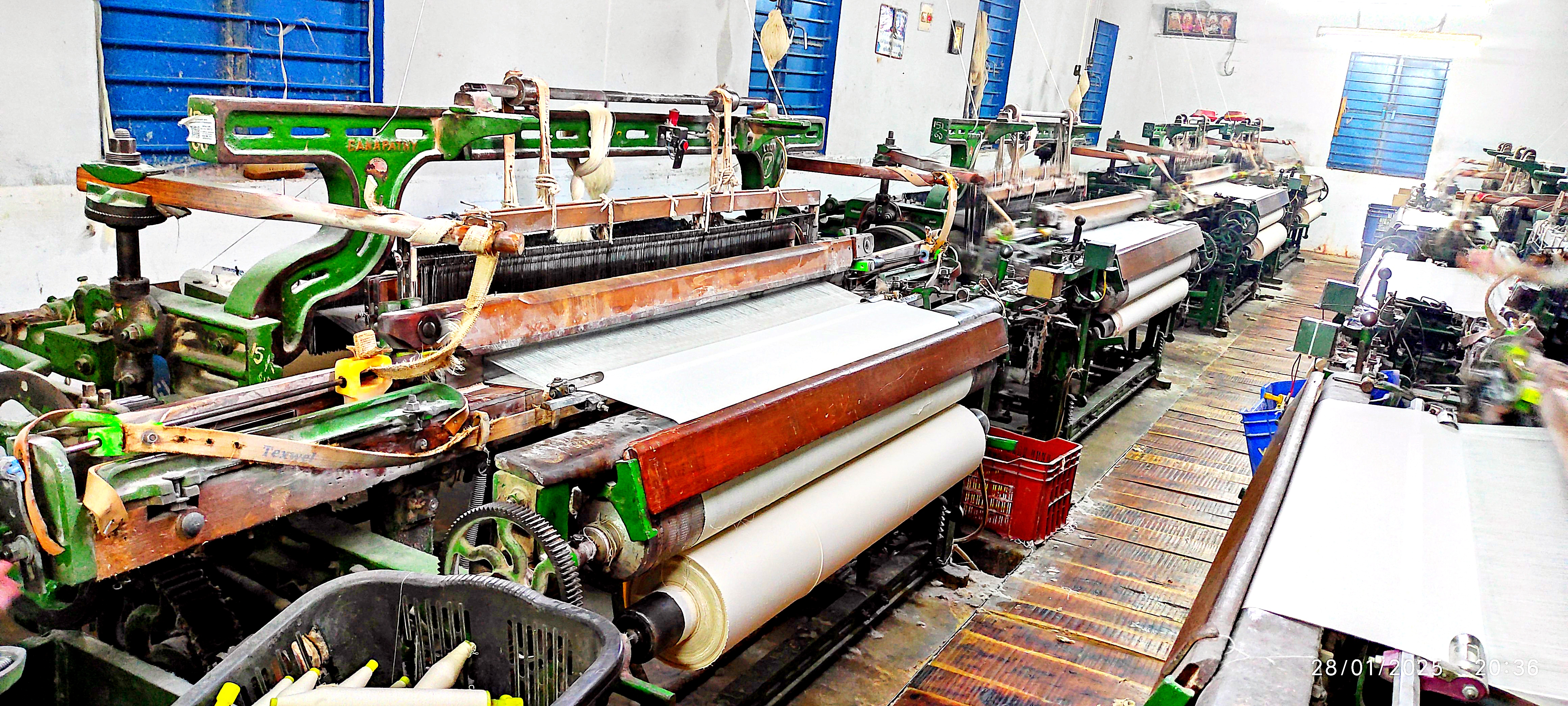
PowerLooms

Thekkalur village is located in Avanashi Tehsil of Tiruppur district in Tamil Nadu, India.It is 8 kilometers away from the sub-district headquarters of Avanashi and 22 kilometers away from the district headquarters of Tiruppur. As per the 2009 statistics, Thekkalur is also a gram panchayat.

Powerloom Hub:

Thekkalur panchayat has more than 500-750 small and micro power loom sheds. This powerloom cluster is a significant source of employment, directly supporting over 1500 families and indirectly benefiting an additional 1000 families. It serves as the primary economic backbone of Thekkalur panchayat. Currently here more than 7850 - 9000 powerloom machines are producing Cotton Fabric.

The total geographical area of the village is 2141.91 hectares. Thekkalur has a total population of 12,688, out of which 6,076 are males and 6,612 are females. The literacy rate of the village is 71.43%, out of which 75.58% of males and 67.62% of females are literate. There are about 3,031 houses in the village. The pincode of the village is 641654.

currently Total voters :8139. largest panchayts in tiruppur district.

Avinashi is the nearest town to Thekkalur for all major economic activities like tshirt manufacturing, textile fabric manufacturing.

== Overview ==
Thekkalur , Avinashi Taluk,641654

- Gram Panchayat : Thekkalur
- Block / Taluka : Avinashi
- District : Tiruppur
- State : Tamil Nadu
- Pincode : 641654
- Area : 2141.91 hectares
- Population : 12,688
- Households : 3,031
- Nearest Town : Avinashi
- Postal Code : 641654

== Sub-villages ==
- Thimmanaiyam Palayam
- Earippalayam
- Pudunaulur
- Sengali palayam
- Gandhi Nagar
- Vellandi Palayam
- Suripalayam
- Chennimalai palayam
- Kamanaikenpalayam
- Alampalayam
- Kallangadu
- Samathuvapuram
