= Yoshiaki Kuruma =

Japanese radio announcer (born 1961)

Yoshiaki Kuruma (車 吉章, Kuruma Yoshiaki; born November 26, 1961) is a Japanese "free announcer" from the Hokuriku region of Japan.

== Biography ==
Kuruma was born in Takaoka, Japan. He attended school in Takaoka and graduated from the Nagoya information business college.

== Professional career ==
Currently Kuruma has three radio programmes on three separate radio stations. These are "Manyo Multi Radio" on Radio Takaoka (Friday, 12pm to 5pm), Korinbo Five Station" on Radio Kanazawa (Wednesday, 5pm to 6pm), "Furari ki mamani" on Toyama City FM.

He also does freelance work as a master of ceremonies at weddings and other functions in the Hokuriku, Nagoya and Tokyo areas.
