= Kurumba people (India) =

Ethnic group in India

Kurumba
Total population
- 88,750 (2011 census)

Regions with significant populations
- Kerala, Karnataka, Tamil Nadu-Nilgiris

Languages
- Kurumba languages

Religion
- Hinduism, Animism

Related ethnic groups
- Dravidians, Tamil

Kurumba or Kurumbar (IPA: [kuru(m)bɐ, kurumɐ], Tamil: Kurumban, Kurumbar, Malayalam: Kuruma(r), Kannada: Kuruba, Kurubaru) are a designated Scheduled Tribe or an indigenous community in the Indian states of Karnataka, Kerala and Tamil Nadu (Nilgiris). The Nilgiris district is home to six tribes. The Kurumbar are one of the earliest known inhabitants of the Western Ghats, who are engaged in the collection and gathering of forest produce, mainly wild honey, wax and elephant husbandry. Non-Nilgiri Kurumbar peoples are generally shepherds. They are historically same but culturally different from each other. Kurumba people of Nilgiri's and surrounding areas speak Kurumba language, which are classified as independent South Dravidian language. New alphabets are released for Kurumba language by some Government Teachers.

== History and origin ==
Kurumbas (Nilgiris) are one of the six ancient tribal groups in Tamil Nadu. According to the Madras Census Report of 1891, Hunting and collecting forest produce are the two main means of living for the Kurumbar tribe. However, the restrictions to protect native forest and wildlife have forced them to find work outside the forests.

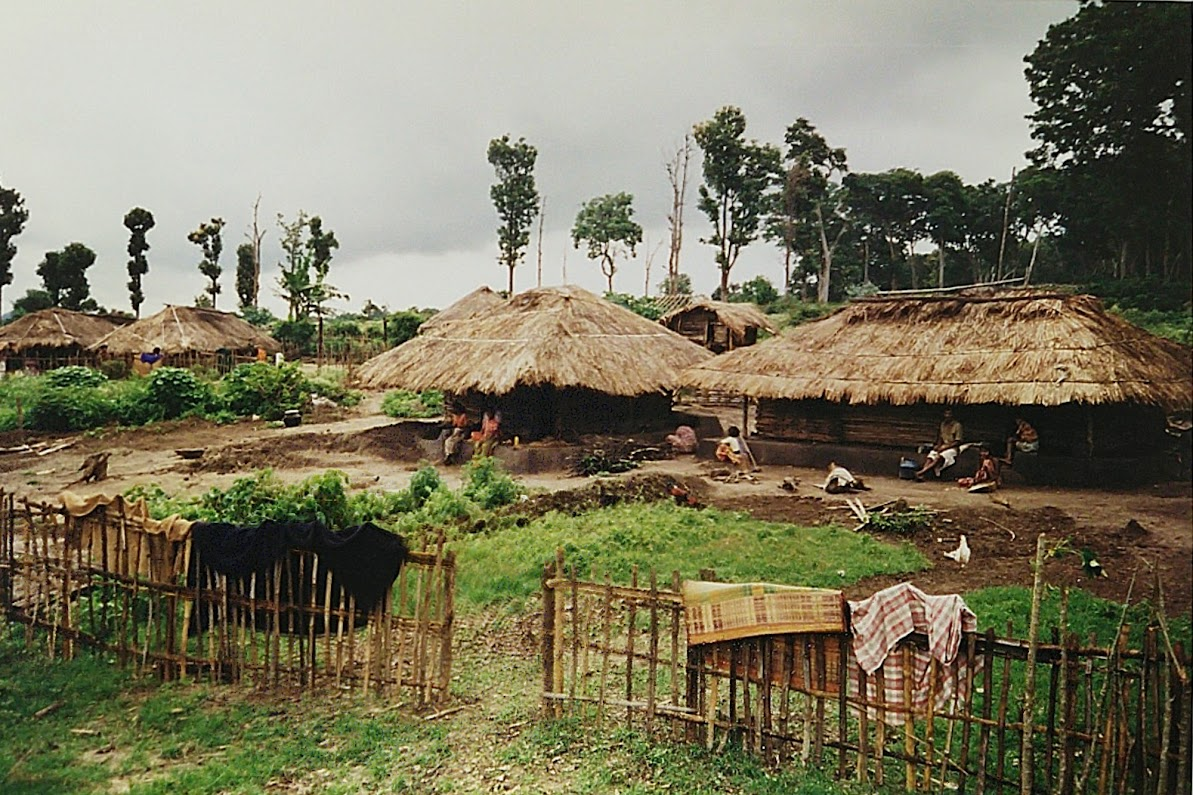
Traditional Kurumbar thatch-roof houses, Tamil Nadu

== Etymology ==
=== Kurumbar ===
The term Kurumba might have origin from a Proto-Dravidian/Tamil/Kannada root kur meaning 'hill, mountain or forest'.

== Culture ==
Nadukarkal (Ancestors stone) plays a main role in Kurumbar deity. They also worship animals, birds, trees, rock hillocks, and snakes, along with the other Hindu deities. Kurumbar are partially sanskritised to believing in Hinduism.

== Subgroups ==
There are several divisions of Kurumbas:

1. Jenu Kurumba
2. Betta Kurumba
3. Alu Kurumba
4. Mullu Kurumba
5. Unne Kurumba
6. Kadu Kurumba

Each of these divisions speaks their own Dravidian language. Jenu Kurubas are primarily found in the northern part of the Nilgiris, in the Mysuru district of Karnataka.

== See also ==
- Kurumba Gounder
- Kurumba Languages
- Kurumbai Aadu (Coimbatore Sheep)
- Kurumba painting
- Lamellipalpodes kurumba
