= Lamellipalpodes =

Scientific classification
- Kingdom: Animalia
- Phylum: Arthropoda
- Class: Insecta
- Order: Coleoptera
- Suborder: Polyphaga
- Infraorder: Elateriformia
- Family: Lampyridae
- Genus: Lamellipalpodes; Maulik, 1921

Genus of beetles

Lamellipalpodes is a genus of firefly beetles in the family Lampyridae. Species are distributed in India, Myanmar, Nepal and Thailand. Species of Lamellipalpodes are known to possess striking morphological features. Males of these genera have morphologically distinct maxillary and labial palps bearing long paddle-like terminal palpomeres which are 5–11 times longer than the penultimate palpomeres. The genus is closely related to Lamellipalpus, the members of which have considerably larger mandibles.

== Species ==
As of 2025, the genus contains 14 species:

- L. annandalei Maulik, 1921 (India: Bengal, Kashmir; Nepal.)
- L. asmita Chakrovorty & Bhattacharjee, 2025
- L. bajhangensis Bocakova et al., 2015
- L. debprasuma Chakrovorty & Moinudheen et al., 2025 (India: Tamilnadu, The Nilgiris.)
- L. godawarensis Bocakova et al., 2015 (Nepal)
- L. himalensis Kazantsev, 2015
- L. holzschuhi Bocakova et al., 2015 (W Nepal)
- L. kurumba Chakrovorty & Moinudheen et al., 2025 (India: Tamilnadu, The Nilgiris.)
- L. lineatus (Pic, 1921)(South India)
- L. masatakai Kawashima, 2007. (E. Myanmar)
- L. montanus Wittmer, 1995 (W Nepal)
- L. nepalensis Wittmer, 1995 (W Nepal)
- L. tsurui Kawashima, 2007 (Thailand)
- L. yunnanensis Bocakova et al., 2015 (China: south Yunnan; northern Laos)
