= Kurumba languages =

Dravidian language spoken in southern India

Kurumba
- Native to: India
- Region: Tamil Nadu, Karnataka, Kerala
- Ethnicity: 88,750 Kurumbar
- Language family: Dravidian: Southern; Tamil–Kannada; Kurumba
- Writing system: Tamil script, Kannada script, Malayalam script

Language codes
- ISO 639-3: kfi
- Glottolog: kann1253
- Kurumba or Kuruba is classified as severely endangered by the UNESCO Atlas of the World's Languages in Danger

Kurumba (also known as Kuruba in Karnataka and Kuruma in Kerala, IPA: [kuru(m)bɐ, kurumɐ]), refers to a group of languages within the Southern Dravidian branch of the Dravidian language family These languages are spoken by the Kurumba communities, who inhabit Nilgiri Hills, in Tamil Nadu and nearby areas including of Coimbatore, Pudukottai etc. The cultural identity of the Kurumba people is expressed extensively through oral traditions, folklore, and music.

== Etymology ==
Several etymological explanations appear in Dravidian linguistics including Tamil classical works. The term Kurumba (also found as Kuruba, or Kuruma) is believed to derive from early Dravidian roots associated with hill-dwelling and shepherd. The root also derived the terms Kurup, Kurichiya, Kurava, and Koraga.

== Classification ==
Kannadoid

- Alu Kurumba
- Betta Kurumba, also known as Urali Kurumba or Kadu Kurumba
- Jennu Kurumba, also known as Ten Kurumba or Kattunaika

Together they are known as Kannada Kurumba as they are similar to Kannada.

Iruloid

- Attapady Kurumba - also known as Palu Kurumba, a dialect of Muduga as they are mutually intelligible.

Malayalamoid

- Mullu Kurumba, also known as Mullu Kuruma

== Language preservation and Documentation ==
Page 205 of UNESCO’s Atlas of the World’s Languages in Danger

Several Kurumba varieties are considered endangered, with ongoing language shift posing a threat to their linguistic heritage. The Central Institute of Indian Languages (CIIL) has initiated efforts to document and preserve these languages as part of broader revitalization measures. Kurumba languages are distinct from Malayalam, Tamil, and Kannada, and linguistic analyses indicate that they retain several features characteristic of Proto-Dravidian.

The Scheme for Protection and Preservation of Endangered Languages (SPPEL), implemented by the Central Institute of Indian Languages (CIIL) under the Government of India, includes Kurumba among the endangered languages targeted for systematic documentation. The programme undertakes the preparation of primers, bi-/trilingual dictionaries (in electronic and print formats), grammatical sketches, pictorial glossaries, and detailed ethno-linguistic profiles of the community. In addition, the Centre for Endangered Languages of Kerala (CELK) at the University of Kerala is developing a primer for three tribal languages of the region: Irula, Muduga, and Kurumba.

== Literature and dictionary ==
Dieter B. Kapp, a German Indologist and linguist from the University of Heidelberg, made significant contributions to the study of Kurumba languages. His work includes the compilation of a comprehensive grammar and an etymological dictionary of the Alu Kurumba language, supplemented with specimen texts and German translations. Kapp’s research supports the classification of Alu Kurumba as an independent South Dravidian language.

In addition, Srinivasa Varma of Annamalai University compiled a dictionary of the Pudukkottai Kurumba dialect, which was published in 1978, providing one of the earliest systematic lexical resources for this variety.

== Movies on Kurumba language ==
The Kurumba-language film Mmmmm ('Sound of Pain'), directed by Vijeesh Mani, was included in the list of 366 films deemed eligible for the Academy Awards by the Academy of Motion Picture Arts and Sciences. The film, which features former Indian footballer I. M. Vijayan in the lead role, portrays the life of a Kurumba tribesman who collects honey for his livelihood and the challenges he faces as environmental degradation leads to a decline in honey availability.

== Geographical distribution ==
Kannadoid Kurumba languages are spoken at the Karnataka-Tamil Nadu border. Irulic and Malayalamoid Kurumba languages are spoken in Wayanad district of Kerala.
