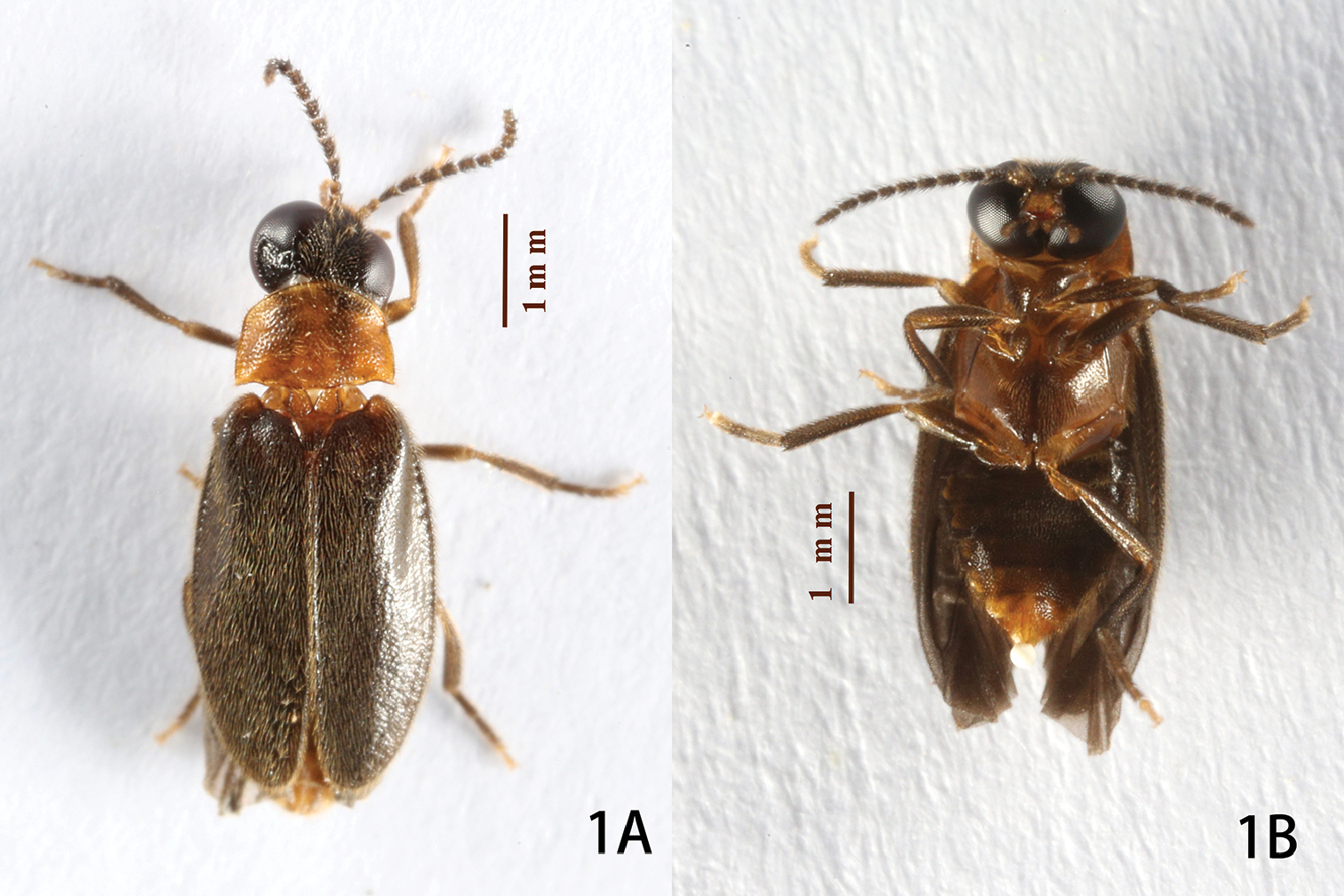
- Oculogryphus chenghoiyanae

Scientific classification
- Kingdom: Animalia
- Phylum: Arthropoda
- Clade: Pancrustacea
- Class: Insecta
- Order: Coleoptera
- Suborder: Polyphaga
- Infraorder: Elateriformia
- Family: Lampyridae
- Subfamily: Ototretinae; McDermott, 1964

Synonyms
- Ototretini, Ototretadrilinae

= Ototretinae =

Subfamily of beetles

The Ototretinae are a small subfamily in the firefly family (Lampyridae). They are close to the Luciolinae in some respects, but do not glow or flash. Rather, they attract their partners with pheromones like many relatives of the firefly family. They are found in Eurasia and North America.

They have sometimes been included in the Luciolinae: as the Ototretini, but it appears that this tribe may not be monophyletic; the puzzling Stenocladius could well be close enough to the Cyphonocerinae to be included there.

== Genera ==
BioLib includes the following genera:

- Baolacus Pic, 1915
- Brachylampis Van Dyke, 1939
- Brachypterodrilus Pic, 1918
- Ceylanidrilus Pic, 1911
- Drilaster Kiesenwetter, 1879
- Emasia Bocakova and Janisova, 2010
- Eugeusis Westwood, 1853
- Falsophaeopterus Pic, 1911
- Flabellopalpodes Bocakova and Bocak, 2016
- Flabellototreta Pic, 1911
- Gorhamia Pic, 1911
- Harmatelia Walker, 1858
- Hydaspoides Bocakova and Janisova, 2013
- Hyperstoma Wittmer, 1979
- Lamellipalpodes Maulik, 1921
- Lamellipalpus Maulik, 1921
- Oculogryphus Jeng, Engel & Yang, 2007 (may be placed incertae sedis)
- Ototretadrilus Pic, 1921
- Picodrilus Wittmer, 1938
- Stenocladius Deyrolle & Fairmaire, 1878

Ototretadrilus was previously placed in the monotypic subfamily Ototretadrilinae, but was transferred to Ototretinae in a 2013 taxonomic revision.
