= Gudalur, Nilgiris =

Gudalur
- Town
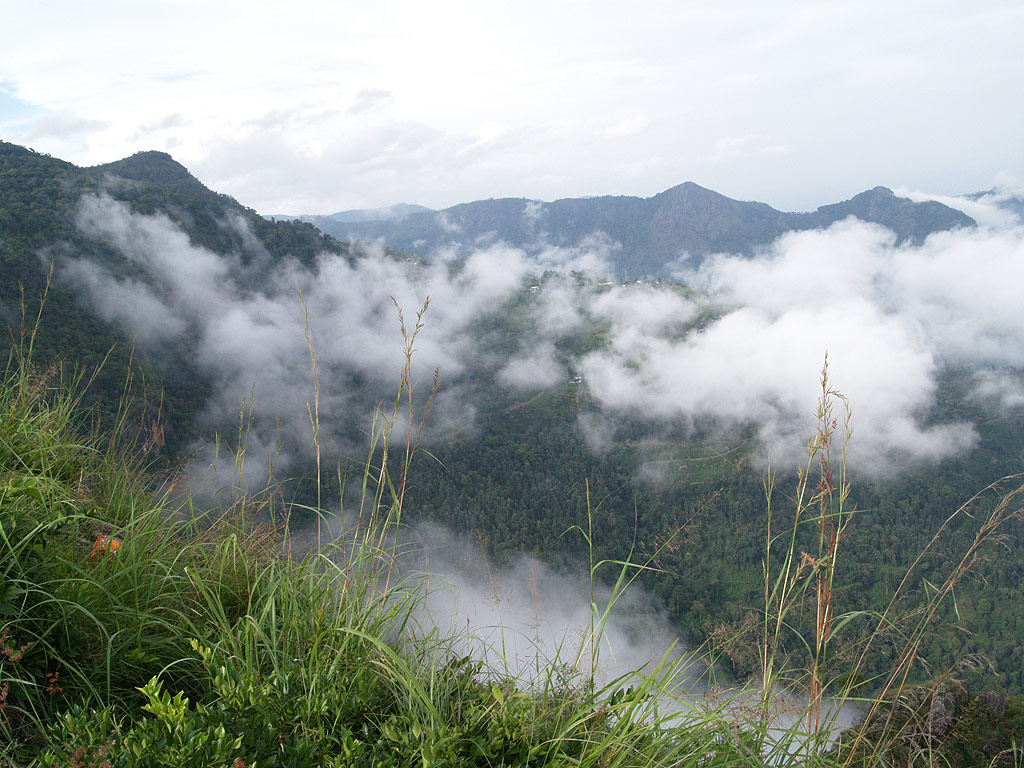
- Needle Rock View Point at Gudalur

- Location in Tamil Nadu, India
- Coordinates: 11.50°N 76.50°E
- Country: India
- State: Tamil Nadu
- District: Nilgiris

Government
  - Type: Second Grade Municipality
  - Body: Gudalur Municipality
  - Chairperson: Rama Mani
- Elevation: 1,072 m (3,517 ft)

Population (2011)
  - Total: 49,540
  - Density: 200/km^{2} (520/sq mi)

Language
  - Official: Tamil
  - Regional: Kannada, Malayalam
- Time zone: UTC+5:30 (IST)
- PIN: 643212, 643211
- Telephone code: 04262
- Vehicle registration: TN 43 Z, TN 43 Y, TN 43 X, TN 43 W
- Sex ratio: 900/1000 ♂/♀

Gudalur is a town in Nilgiris district in the India state of Tamil Nadu.

== Demographics ==
=== Religions ===
Religious census
Religion	Percent(%)
Hindu	59.83%
Muslim	26.01%
Christian	14.1%
Sikh	0.01%
Other	0.05%
No religion	0.01%

=== Languages ===
Languages in Gudalur taluk (2011)
1. Malayalam (46.9%)
2. Tamil (38.8%)
3. Kannada (8.80%)
4. Others (5.50%)

According to 2011 census, Gudalur had a population of 49,535 with a sex-ratio of 1,032 females for every 1,000 males, much above the national average of 929. A total of 5,359 were under the age of six, constituting 2,719 males and 2,640 females. Scheduled Castes and Scheduled Tribes accounted for 27.66% and 3.65% of the population respectively. The literacy rate of the town was 79.48%, compared to the national average of 72.99%. The town had a total of 12101 households. There were a total of 18,807 workers, comprising 551 cultivators, 1,759 main agricultural labourers, 206 household industries, 14,488 other workers, 1,803 marginal workers, 90 marginal cultivators, 278 marginal agricultural labourers, 119 marginal workers in household industries and 1,316 other marginal workers. As per the religious census of 2011, Gudalur had 59.83% Hindus, 26.01% Muslims, 14.1% Christians, 0.01% Sikhs, 0.05% following other religions and 0.01% following no religion or did not indicate any religious preference.

== Climate ==
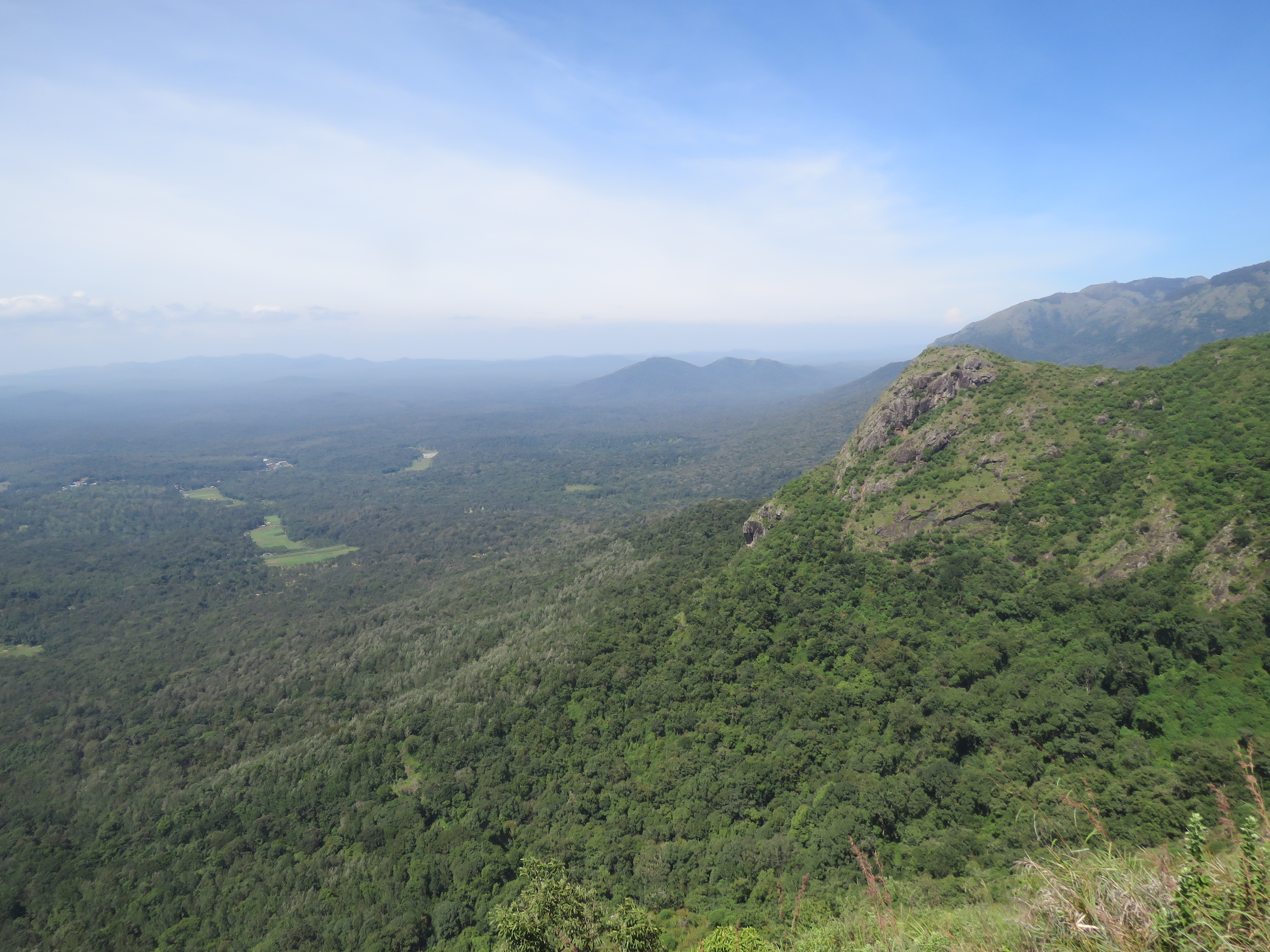
Gudalur Viewed from Ooty Hill Road

Gudalur is situated at a height of approximately 3,500 feet (1,100 m) above sea level. The normal rainfall is 3000 mm per annum. While 75% of the rain is received during the southwest monsoon, (June to August) and northeast monsoon (October to November) contribution of northeast monsoon is only 15% to the total of rainfall and 8% of the rains are received during the hot weather and 2% during the winter. The weather is mainly dry during January–March and the moisture content gradually increases thereon under the influence of southwest monsoon.

== Politics ==
Dhravidamani.M from DMK is the Member of Legislative Assembly from Gudalur constituency, defeating the incumbent Pon Jayaseelan of AIADMK.

Gudalur assembly constituency is one of the three constituencies in the Nilgiris district and the Gudalur assembly constituency a is part of Nilgiris (Lok Sabha constituency).

== History ==
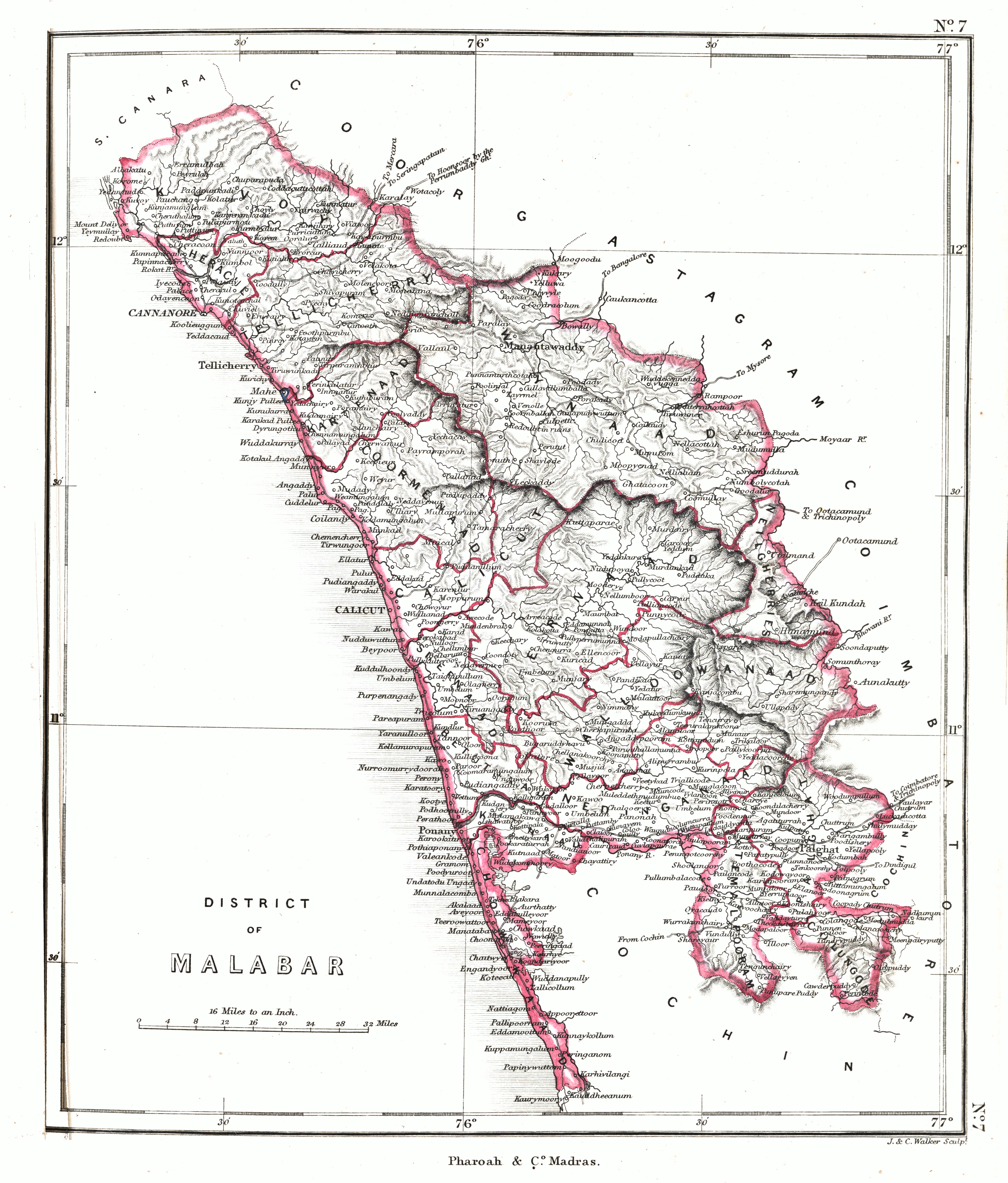
An old map of Malabar District (1854). Note that the taluks Pandalur, Gudalur, and Kundah in present-day Nilgiris district were parts of Wayanad Taluk in 1854. The Taluks of Malabar were rearranged in 1860 and 1877.

=== Pre-history ===
Historians believe that the human settlements existed in these parts for at least ten centuries before Christ. Much evidence of New Stone Age civilisation can be seen in the hills throughout the present day Wayanad district. The Edakkal Caves has 6000-year-old rock engravings from the Neolithic age. The recorded history of this district is available only from the 18th century. In ancient times, this land was ruled by the Rajas of the Veda tribe.

=== Ezhimala kingdom ===
In the earliest part of the recorded history of Gudalur region, Wayanad District, Kasaragod-Kannur-Wayanad-Kozhikode Districts in the northern part of present-day Kerala were ruled by the Nannans (Mushika dynasty) who later came to be known as the Kolathiris. Politically the area was part of the Ezhimala Kingdom with its Capital at Ezhimala in present day Kannur district. The most famous King of Ezhimala was Nannan whose Kingdom extended up to Gudalur, Nilgiris and northern parts of Coimbatore. It is said that Nannan took refuge at Wayanad hills in the 5th century CE when he was lost to Cheras, just before his death in battle, according to the Sangam works. Wayanad was a part of the Karkanad which included the eastern regions of Ezhimala kingdom (Wayanad-Gudalur areas including part of Kodagu (Coorg)). Karkanad along with Poozhinadu, which contained much of the coastal belt wedged between Mangalore and Kozhikode was under Ezhimala kingdom with the headquarters at Ezhimala.

=== Kolathunadu ===
The Mooshaka Kings were considered descendants of Nannan. By the 14th century, Mooshaka Kingdom was known as Kolathirinad and the Rulers as Kolathiris. The Kolathunad Kingdom at the peak of its power reportedly extended from Kasaragod in the north to Korapuzha in the south with Arabian Sea on the west and Kodagu hills on the eastern boundary.

=== Kingdom of Kottayam ===
The Kolathiri Dominion emerged into independent 10 principalities i.e., Kadathanadu (Vadakara), Randathara or Poyanad (Dharmadom), Kottayam (Thalassery), Nileshwaram, Iruvazhinadu (Panoor), Kurumbranad etc., under separate royal chieftains due to the outcome of internal dissensions. The Nileshwaram dynasty on the northernmost part of Kolathiri dominion, were relatives to both Kolathunadu as well as Zamorin of Calicut, in the early medieval period. The origin of Kottayam Royal Family (the Kottayam referred here is Kottayam-Malabar near Thalassery, not to be confused with Kottayam in Southern Kerala) is lost in obscurity. It has been stated that the Raja of Kottayam set up a semi-independent principality of his own at the expense of Kolathiris. In the 10th century AD, the region comprised erstwhile Taluks of Kottayam, Wayanad and Gudallur was called Puraikizhanad and its feudal lord Puraikizhars. The Thirunelly Inscriptions refer to the division of Puraikizhar Family into two branches viz., Elder (Muthukur) and Younger (Elamkur) in the beginning of the 11th century. In 17th century Kottayam-Malabar was the Capital of Puraikizhanad (Puranattukara) Rajas. It was divided into three branches i.e., Eastern, Western and Southern under separate dignitaries known as Mootha, Elaya and Munnarkur Rajas. The Kottayam Rajas extended their influence up to the border of Kodagu. By the end of the 17th century, they shared the area of Thalassery Taluk with the Iruvazhinadu Nambiars and were in possession of North Wayanad and the small Village of Thamarassery which formed the Eastern portion of the present Vadakara, Quilandy and Thamarassery Taluks.

=== Carnatic invasions into Wayanad and Gudalur ===
In 930 AD, emperor Erayappa of Ganga Dynasty led his troops to south west of Mysore and after conquering, called it Bayalnad meaning the land of swamps. After Erayappa, his sons Rachamalla and Battunga fought each other for the new kingdom of their father's legacy. Rachamalla was killed and Battunga became the undisputed ruler of Bayalnad. In the 12th century AD, Gangas were dethroned from Bayalnad by Kadamba dynasty of North Canara. In 1104 AD Vishnuvardhana of Hoysala invaded Bayalnad followed by Vijayanagara dynasty in the 16th century. In 1610 AD, Udaiyar Raja Wadiyar of Mysore drove out Vijayanagara General and became the ruler of Bayalnad and the Nilgiris. Bayalnad is the present Wayanad.

==== Mysore Sultans ====
When Wayanad was under Hyder Ali's rule, the ghat road from Vythiri to Thamarassery was invented. Then the British rulers developed this route to Carter road. After Hyder Ali, his son Tipu Sultan took control over the territory.

==== Colonial era ====
Kundah taluk was transferred from Malabar to Coimbatore in 1860. Southeast Wayanad region of Wayanad Taluk in Malabar District was the regions included in the Gudalur and Pandalur Taluks of present Nilgiris district. Southeast Wynad was a part of Malabar District until 31 March 1877, when it was transferred to the neighbouring Nilgiris district due to the heavy population of Malabar and the small area of Nilgiris. It consisted of the following 3 Amsoms.

- Munnanad
- Nambalakode
- Cherankode
