= Cherangode =

Village in Tamil Nadu, India

- Village
- Location within Tamil Nadu Location within India
- Coordinates: 11°31′53″N 76°19′31″E
- Country: India
- State: Tamil Nadu
- District: Nilgiris
- Taluk: Panthalur

Government
  - Type: Sarpanch

Area
  - Total: 74.94 km^{2} (28.93 sq mi)
- Elevation: 956 m (3,136 ft)

Population (2011)
  - Total: 33,506
  - Density: 447.1/km^{2} (1,158/sq mi)

Languages
  - Official: Tamil
- Time zone: UTC+5:30 (IST)
- PIN: 643205
- STD code: 04262
- Vehicle registration: TN-43

Cherangode is a village located in Tamil Nadu, India. It is located close to Tamil Nadu's western border with Kerala. As of 2011, the village had a population of 33,506.

== Geography ==
Cherangode is located to the west of the Nilgiri Mountains, about 42 kilometres northwest of the district capital Udhagamandalam. The total area of the village is 7494 hectares.

== Demographics ==
According to the 2011 census, the population of Cherangode was 33,506, including 16,475 males and 17,031 females. The working-age population accounted for 45.21% of the total population. The literacy rate stood at 78.65%, with 13,840 of the male residents and 12,511 of the female residents being literate.
