= Sri Chirakkakavu Bhagavthi Temple =

Hindu Temple in Kerala, India

Coordinates: 11.7696°N 75.4774°E

Sree Chirakkakavu Bhagavathi Temple is a Hindu temple At Thalassery, North Malabar in the state of Kerala, India. It is one of the oldest Devi Temples in North Kerala. The temple is surrounded by kavu or groves of trees.

== History and dedication ==
The presiding deity of this temple is the goddess Kaali, who is worshipped as Thrigunaathmika (in three forms). According to established belief, the temple was built by Chirakkkal Raja, the king of Kolathiri, after a svayambhu of Kaali the Koduvally River, and thus bears his name. Kaali is said to have appeared at Vamal with her retinue, in a palace at the river's confluence with the sea, and in the form of a divine fish. The king built the temple on top of Illikkunnu, believed to be the thapovan of an earlier era.

The temple structure is believed to be at least 800 years old.

=== Other deities (upadevathas) ===
Guntur Kotta vaanavar, Ilankarumakan and Poothadi are in a single shrine near the temple. Outside the Nalambalam there is a Sarppakkavu (Snake Shrine) in the south-west corner of the temple which contains Nagaraja, Nagakanyaka and Chithrkoodam.

== Festivals ==
=== Temple festival ===
The temple festival is celebrated every year on days 9-12 of the Malayalam month of Medam which usually falls on 22 to 25 April.

On Medom 9th the thantrik poojas and Uthsavabali is observed. In the evening the Uthsalva kolam (Thidambu) is taken out of the temple as Ezhunnallathu by the temple priest. This occasion is the only time where the goddess comes out of the temple in full alankaras in Ulthasava Thidambu.

=== Theyyam ===
Following this is Theyyam, a three-day festival. The four manifestations of the goddess, Chorakalathil Bhagavathi, Puthiya Bhagavathi and Cheriya Thampuratty, are the daughters of the mother goddess and Valiya Thampuratty. Guntoor Kotta vanavan, Ilankarumakan, Poothadi are the other male Theyyams here. On Medom 10th the Nattathira is celebrated here.

On 11 th Medom Ariyalavu is observed. This is a practice of giving rice, pulses and coconut oils to the all concerned communities to the kavu. This custom recalls the riches of bygone times. In the morning of 11th Medom Valaiya Thampuratty visits all devotees in the village (hosuses comes under Anchukandy Parambu) and blesses the devotees. In the olden days, the Temple owned land from Vamla To Kali. Kalasams come from various parts of the villages to make offerings to the devi. Motha Kalasam and Vaikalasam have the right to enter the temple first.

By the early hours of 12th Medom the Theyyams start to come to the Thirumuttam in this order: Guntoor Kotta Vanavar, Chorakalathil Bhagavathi and Puthiya bhgagavathi. It is considered a blessing when a few drops of rain sweep through as Chaorakalthil bhagavthi theyyam appears on the courtyard of the temple. A Mulla Mala (Jasmine garland) is the traditional offering to Chorakkalathil Bhagavathi. Thirdly comes the Theyaam of Puthiya Bhagavathi (Theethira), The theyaam comes with the fire as ornaments and blesses the devotees.

By the morning of 12th Medom the theyyam of Ilankarumankan and Poothadi appears on the courtyard of the temple. The theyyam is of divine war between the two. Then Thampuratty comes out into the courtyard. The Aattam of Thampuratty with her divine sword is a very rare sight which gives her devotees a life’s blessings. Then the Cheriya Thampuratty appears on the courtyard of the temple with beautiful white hair and other decorations. Then the Thampuratty with Thirumudy and her daughter, Cheriaya Champuratty travel around the temple, followed by the kalasalams and devotees in procession.

== Important days of the temple ==
- Chingam- Uthradam - Nira Aaghosham
- Navarathi- Saraswthi Pooja, Grantha Pooja, Vahana Pooja, Vidhyarambam.
- Dhanu 9- Mandala Pooja- Chuttuvialakku
- Makaram- Prathishta Dinam
- Medom 9-12 Uthsavam- Thira Mahothsavam

== Temple timings ==
Morning 5:30 Shrine opens, then Abhishekam 7:00 Usha Pooja 11:30 Ucha Pooja 12:30 Temple closes

Evening 5:00 Temple reopens 6:00 Deepaaradhana (around dusk) 7:30 Athazhapooja 8:00 Shrine Closes

Every day At Vamal the Sree Moola Stanam Kalasam is celebrated after the Uchpooja.

== Renovation ==
The Sreekovil was renovated recently. Punaprathishta was done with Astabandha Kalasam in the year 2000.
