= Porlathiri =

Polarthiri was a royal house which ruled part of Calicut before Zamorin around 1200s and later Kadathanadu in South India. Ruled by the Polarthiries, Kadathanadu garnered renown, particularly for its association with the martial art form of Kalaripayattu, a discipline known for producing formidable warriors.

.

== Bibliography ==
- Logan, William (1887). Malabar Manual. India: William Logan, British East India Company. ISBN 81-206-0446-6.
- Menon, P. Shungoonny. "History of Travancore from the Earliest Times."
- Panikkar, K. M. "Malabar and the Portuguese."
- Wilks, Mark. "Historical Sketches of the South of India."
- "Kadathanad Kovilakam Charithram" (Unpublished Manuscript).
- "Vadakkan Pattukal" (Folk Songs of North Malabar).
- "Keralacharithram" by K. P. Padmanabha Menon.
