= Kadathanadu =

Region in the Malabar Coast, India

Kadathanadu (Malayalam: [kɐɖɐt̪ːɐnaːɖə̆]), also rendered Kadathanad, Katattanad, and, academically, Kaṭattanāṭǔ; alternately known as Vatakara or Badagara, was a kingdom in North Malabar just north of the Korappuzha River, ruled by the Porlathiri dynasty after their dispossession from their native realm of Calicut and Polanad. Its ruler was known as Vazhunnavar, often rendered 'Boyanore', until 1750, whereupon their prior titulature of Raja was resumed.

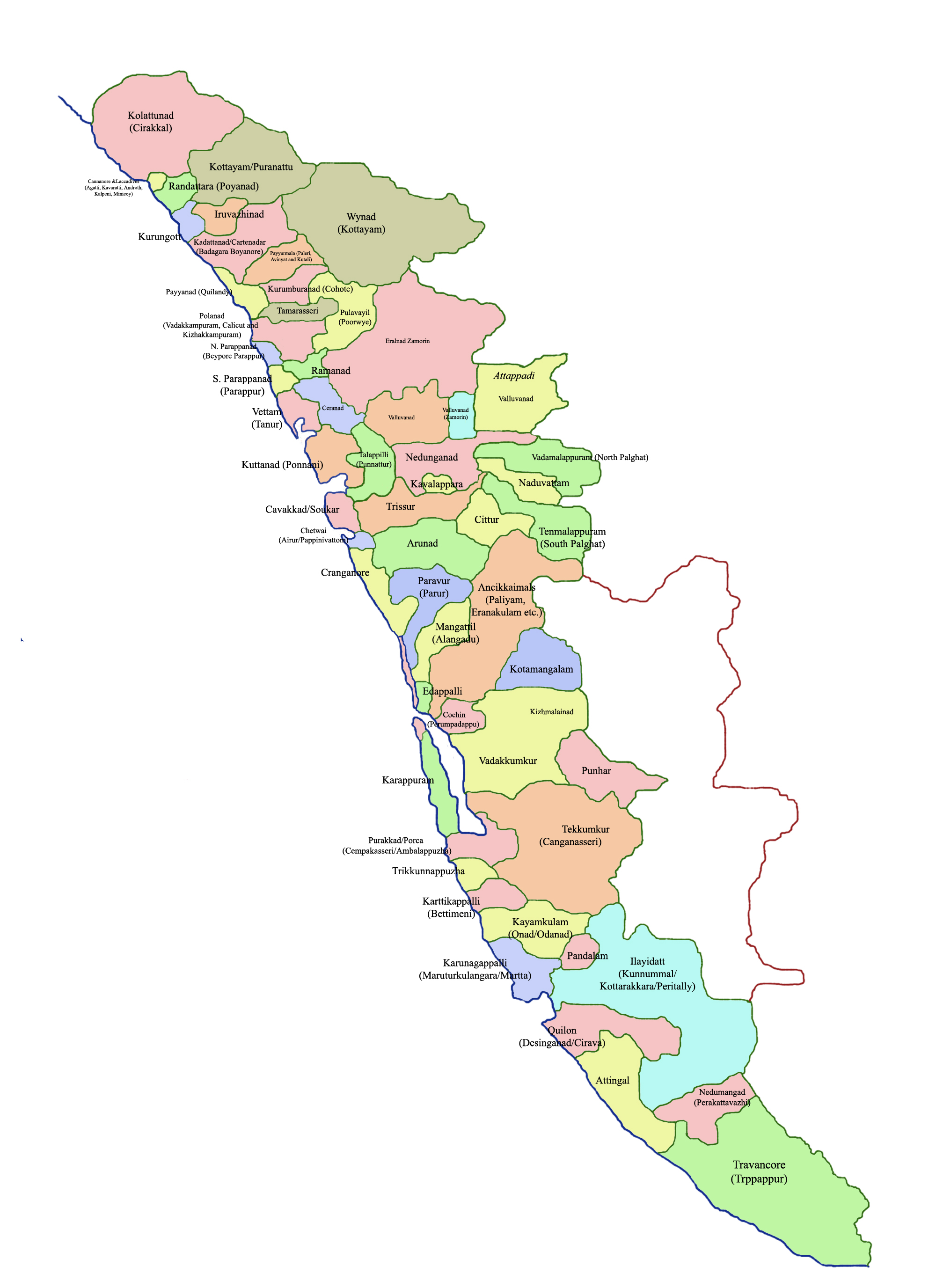
Kerala in the Late Middle Ages

The establishment of the kingdom dates to the flight of the Porlathiri, fleeing the Zamorin's conquest of Calicut, to seek asylum in Kolathiri territory; where a chance lakeside encounter led to a Kolathiri prince of the Southern Regency scandalously espousing the Porlathiri heiress, who traditionally would only have hypergamously contracted sambandham with a Nambudiripad Brahmin. The dynamics of the marriage led to significant carveouts from the Southern Regency, with the hereditary governance matrilineally vested in the line of the Porlathiri princess and her Kolathiri groom.

== Geographical location ==
Geographically, Kadathanadu is situated to the south of Thalassery and north of Koyilandy on the Malabar coast, beside the historical Kottakkal river. The area roughly six kilometers from Vatakara is known as Kadathanadu. The place is now part of Puduppanam in Vatakara.

Kadathanadu is also the site of the famous Hindu Lokanarkavu temple.

== History ==
The erstwhile princely state of Kadathanadu was ruled by Rajas of Kadathanadu, who were of Nair origin and was feudatories to the Kolathiri. Around 1750, the ruler of Kadathanadu had adopted the title of Raja, with the explicit consent of the Kolathiri. Harivihar is the 150-year-old residence of the Kadathanadu royal family. Legend has it that the sons of the Kadathanadu rulers were sent to Calicut to be educated in institutions set up by the Zamorin of Calicut, and hence a city house was built for the young princes.

During Malayalam Era 965, corresponding to 1789–90, Tipu Sultan crossed over to Malabar with his army. A small army of 2000 Kadathanadu Nairs resisted the invasion from a fortress in Kuttipuram near Nadapuram for a few weeks. This land, whose Sanskrit name is Ghatolkachakshiti, mainly included parts of the present Vadakara taluk. The king of Katthannad was addressed as Vazhunnor.
