= Kottayam-Malabar =

Census Town in Kerala, India

- Census Town
- Location in Kerala, India Kottayam-Malabar (India)
- Coordinates: 11.8269°N 75.5495°E
- Country: India
- State: Kerala
- District: Kannur

Area
  - Total: 8.43 km^{2} (3.25 sq mi)

Population (2011)
  - Total: 19,176
  - Density: 2,270/km^{2} (5,890/sq mi)

Languages
  - Official: Malayalam, English
- Time zone: UTC+5:30 (IST)
- PIN: 670643
- Telephone code: 0490
- ISO 3166 code: IN-KL
- Vehicle registration: KL-58
- Nearest city: Kuthuparamba
- Sex ratio: 1000:1176 ♂/♀
- Lok Sabha constituency: Vatakara
- Vidhan Sabha constituency: Kuthuparamba

Kottayam-Malabar is a census town near Kuthuparamba in Kannur district of Kerala state in India. It is different from the city of Kottayam in Kottayam district of the same state.

== History ==
Kingdom of Kottayam is a historic province of old Malabar district in India. It covered what is today Talassery Taluk of Kannur district. The headquarters of the kingdom was at Kottayam-Malabar town. The Raja of Kottayam presided over the province. Pazhassi Raja was a member of the western branch of the Kottayam royal clan. When Hyder Ali of the Kingdom of Mysore occupied Malabar in 1773, the Raja of Kottayam found political asylum in Kallara near Vikom in Kottayam district of Kerala. Pazhassi Raja, the fourth prince in line for succession to the throne during this period, became one of the de facto heads of state, surpassing several older royal contenders.

== Demographics ==
As of 2011 Census, Kottayam-Malabar census town had population of 19,176 which constitutes 8,813 males and 10,363 females. Kottayam-Malabar census town spreads over an area of 8.43 square kilometres (3.25 sq mi) with 3,815 families residing in it. The sex ratio was 1176 higher than state average of 1084. Population of children in the age group 0–6 was 2,302 (12%) where 1,141 are males and 1,161 are females. Kottayam-Malabar had an overall literacy of 96.2% higher than state average of 94%. The male literacy stands at 97.7% and female literacy was 95%.

== Transportation ==
The national highway passes through Thalassery town. Mangalore, Goa and Mumbai can be accessed on the northern side and Kochi and Thiruvananthapuram can be accessed on the southern side. The road to the east of Iritty connects to Mysore and Bangalore. The nearest railway station is Thalassery on Mangalore-Palakkad line. Trains are available to almost all parts of India subject to advance booking over the internet. There are airports at Mattannur known as Kannur Airport,Mangalore and Kozhikode. All of them are international airports but direct flights are available only to Middle Eastern countries.

== See also ==
- Kingdom of Kottayam
