= Kurumbranad =

Feudal state in present-day Kerala, India

Kurumbranad (Kurumbuzhai Nadu or Kurumbiathiri Swaroopam) was a kingdom, located in present-day Kerala state, South India, on the Malabar Coast. Once a powerful kingdom, it had important commercial centres such as Mapayil, Puthuppanam and Vatakara. The area was bordered by the sea on the west side and Karnataka in the east.

On the north side was Kolathu Nadu and in the south lay Polanad (former name of Calicut). Their central power was concentrated in present-day Balussery where they built their capital around their largest fort, the Balussery-Kota flanked by a unique temple dedicated to their family deity, Vettakkorumakan. The famed Malabari warrior and legendary local hero, Thacholi Othenan had ancestors in the Kurumbranad Royal Family. The last king of the Kurumbranad Dynasty was Rama Varma II Valiya Raja who was forced to abdicate in 1958 and ended the line of succession.

== See also ==
- Balussery
- Thacholi Othenan
- Vettakkorumakan
