= Edakkal caves =

Caves and archaeological site in Kerala, India

- ഇടക്കൽ ഗുഹകൾ (Malayalam)
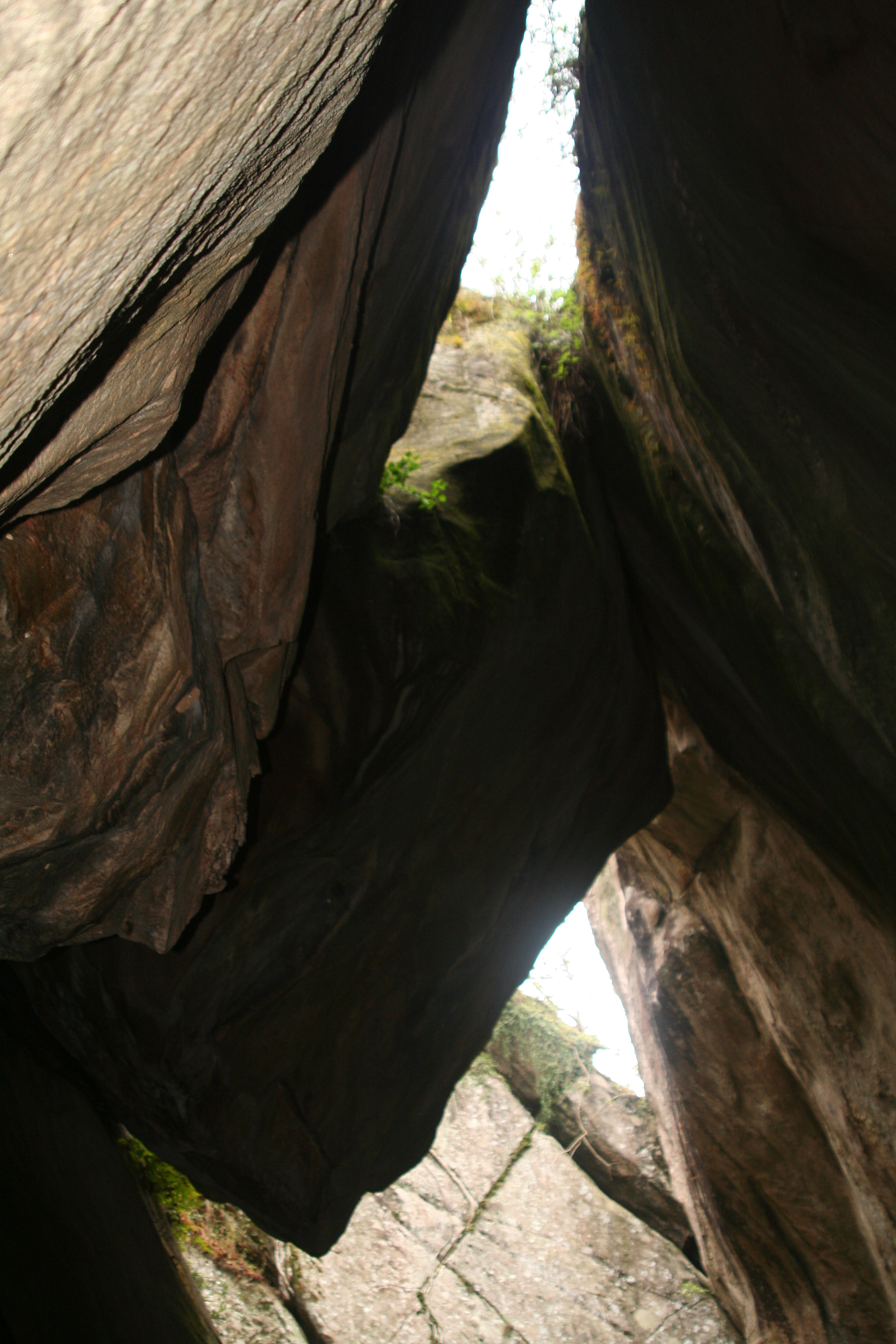
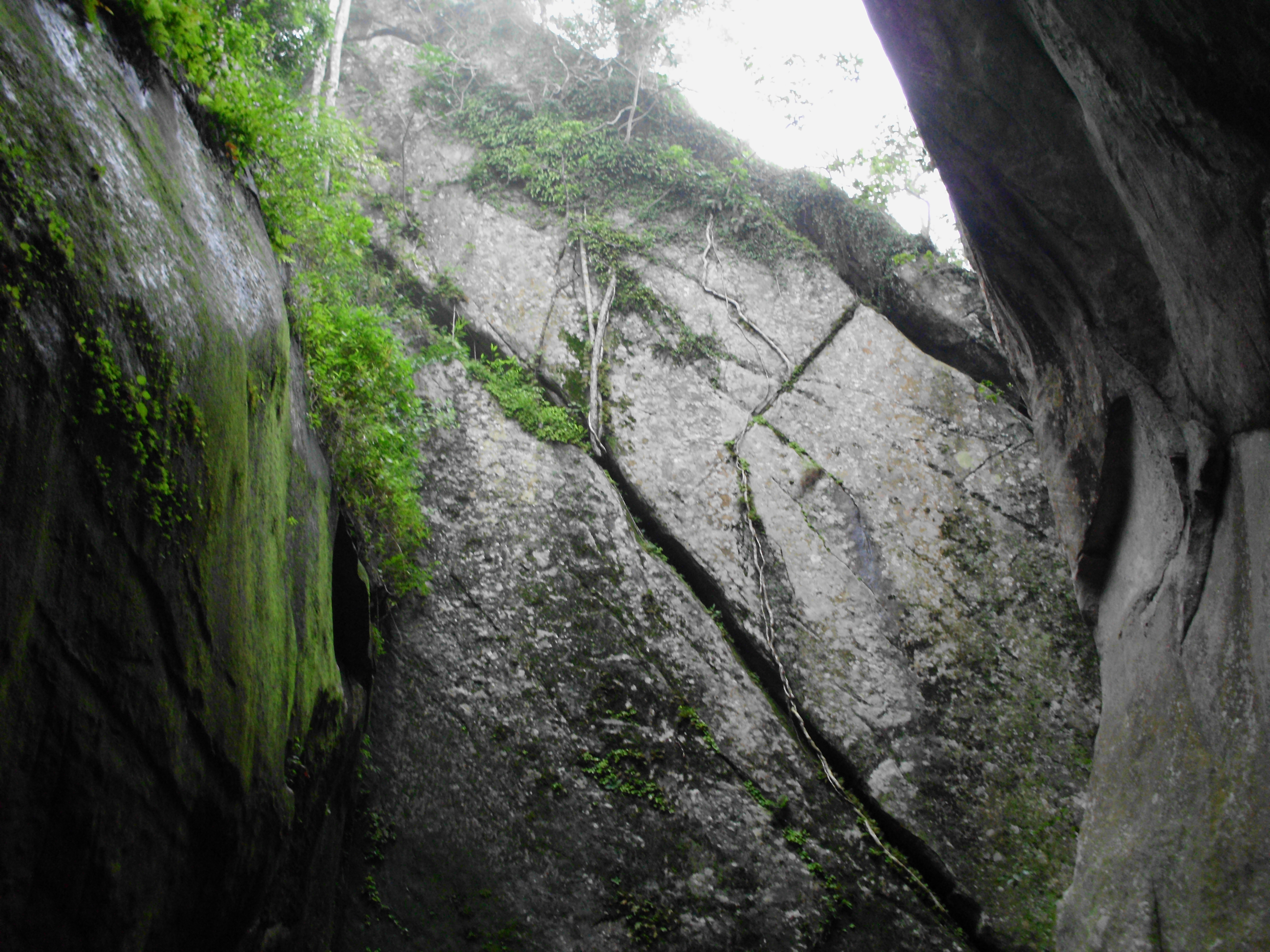
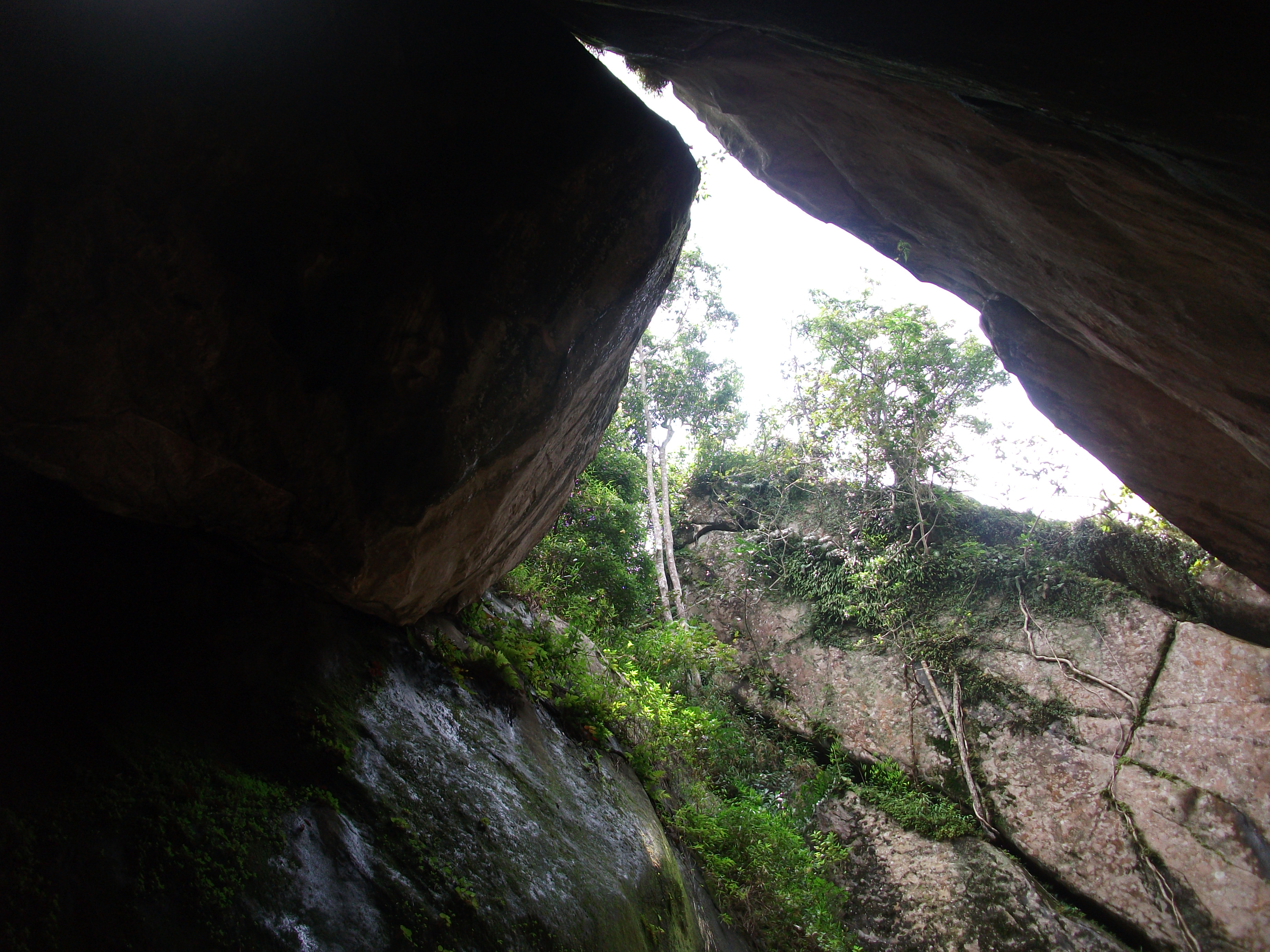
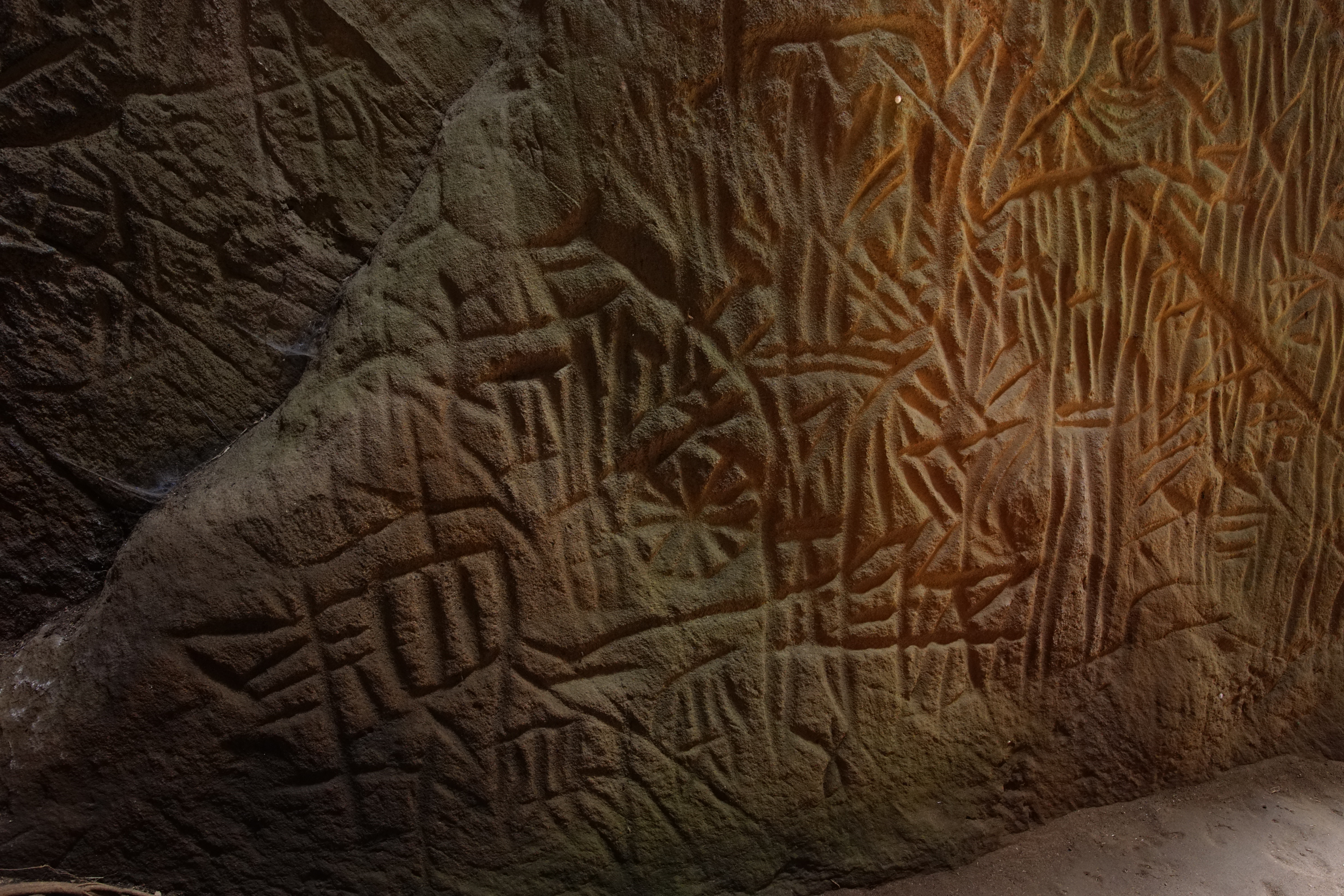
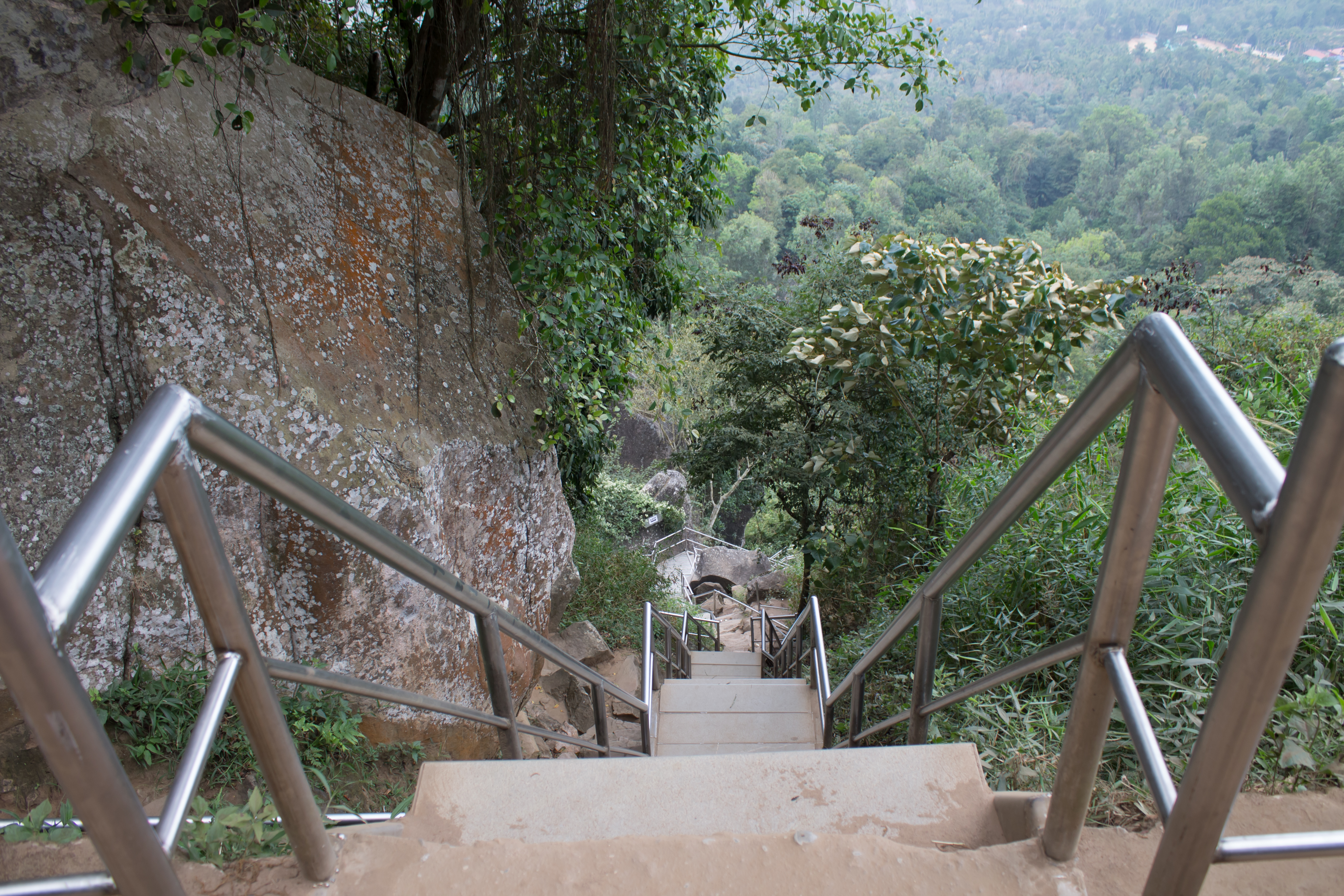

- location in Kerala, India Edakkal caves (India)
- 11°37′28.81″N 76°14′8.88″E
- Location: Sultan bathery of Kerala
- Region: India

History
- Built: 6000 BC-1700 BC

Site notes
- Discovered: Fred Fawcett in 1890

The Edakkal caves are two natural caves at a remote location in Sultan Bathery in the Wayanad district of Kerala in India. They lie 1,200 m (3,900 ft) above sea level on Ambukutty Mala, near an ancient trade route connecting the high mountains of Mysore to the ports of the Malabar Coast. Inside the caves are etched petroglyphs believed to date to at least 6,000 BCE, from the Neolithic period, indicating the presence of a prehistoric settlement in this region. The Stone Age carvings of Edakkal are rare and are the only known examples from South India besides those of Shenthurini, Kollam, also in Kerala. The cave paintings of Shenthurini (Shendurney) forests in Kerala are of the Mesolithic era (middle stone-age).

== Petroglyphs ==
These rock carvings are not technically in the caves, but in a cleft, rift or rock shelter approximately 96 ft (29 m) by 22 ft (6.7 m), a 30-foot (9.1 m) deep fissure caused by a piece of rock splitting away from the main body. On one side of the cleft is a rock weighing several tons that covers the cleft to form the 'roof' of the cave. The carvings are of human and animal figures, tools used by humans and of symbols yet to be deciphered, suggesting the presence of a prehistoric settlement.

The petroglyphs inside the cave are of at least three types. The oldest may date back to over 8,000 years. Evidence suggests that the Edakkal caves were inhabited several times at different points in history.

The caves were discovered by Fred Fawcett, a police official of the erstwhile Malabar state in 1890, who immediately recognised their anthropological and historical importance. He wrote an article about them, attracting the attention of scholars.

== Probable links with Indus Valley civilization ==
The caves contain drawings that range over periods from the Neolithic as early as 6,000 BCE to 1,000 BCE. The youngest paintings have been in the news for a possible connection to the Indus Valley civilization.

Historian Raghava Varier of the Kerala State Archaeology Department identified a depiction as "man with jar cup" that is the most distinct motif of the Indus Valley civilization. The finding, made in September 2009, indicates that the Harappan civilization was active in the region. The "a man with jar cup" symbol from Edakkal seems to be more similar to the Indus motif than those already known from Tamil Nadu and Karnataka. Mr. Varier said "The discovery of the symbols is akin to that of the Harappan civilization having predominantly Dravidian culture and testimony to the fact that cultural diffusion could take place. It is wrong to presume that the Indus culture disappeared into thin air." Iravatham Mahadevan, a scholar of the Indus Valley scripts said the findings were very significant, calling it a "major discovery".

== See also ==
- Petroglyph
- Rock art
- Rock Shelters of Bhimbetka
- Edakallu Guddada Mele

== Image gallery ==
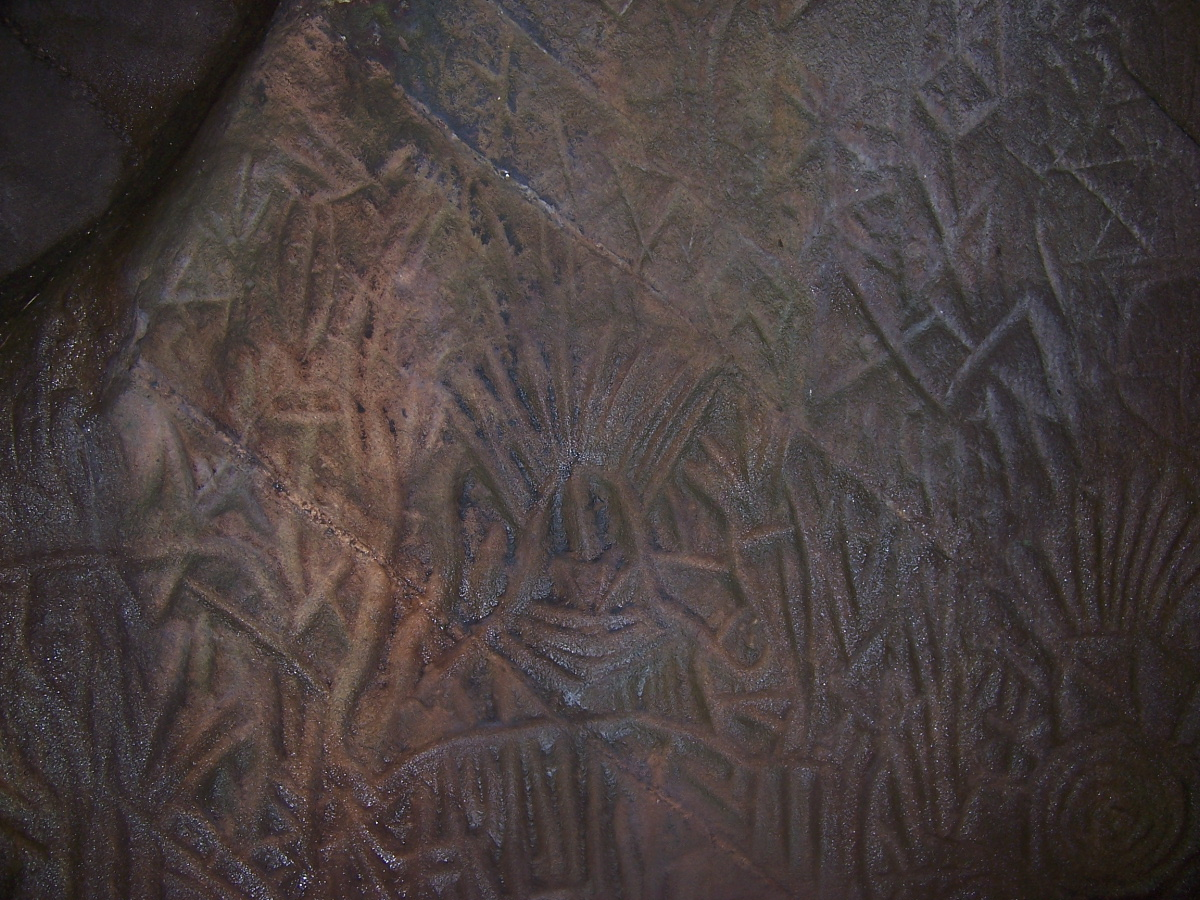
Stone Age drawings

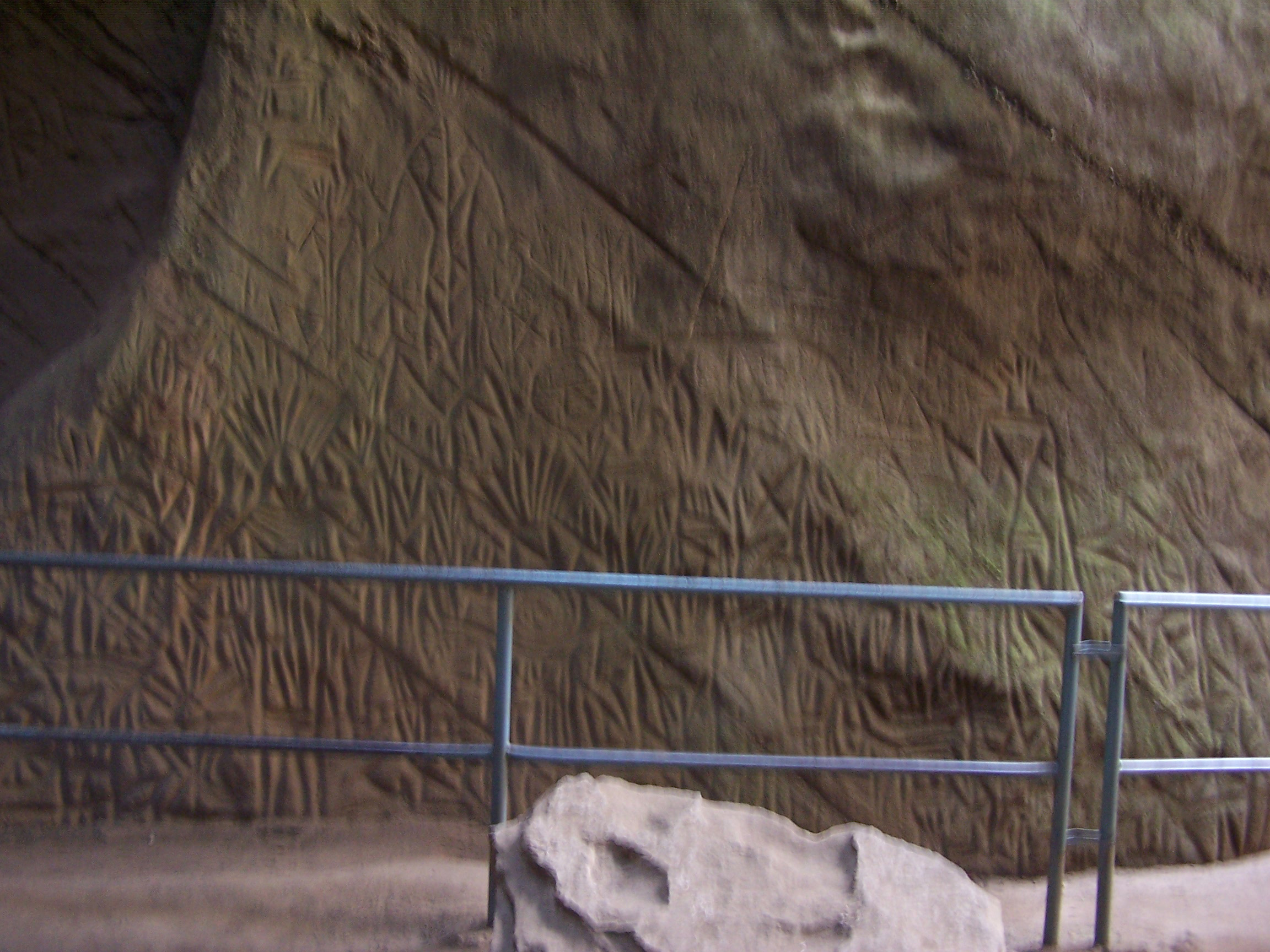
Petroglyphs dating back to about 6000 BC

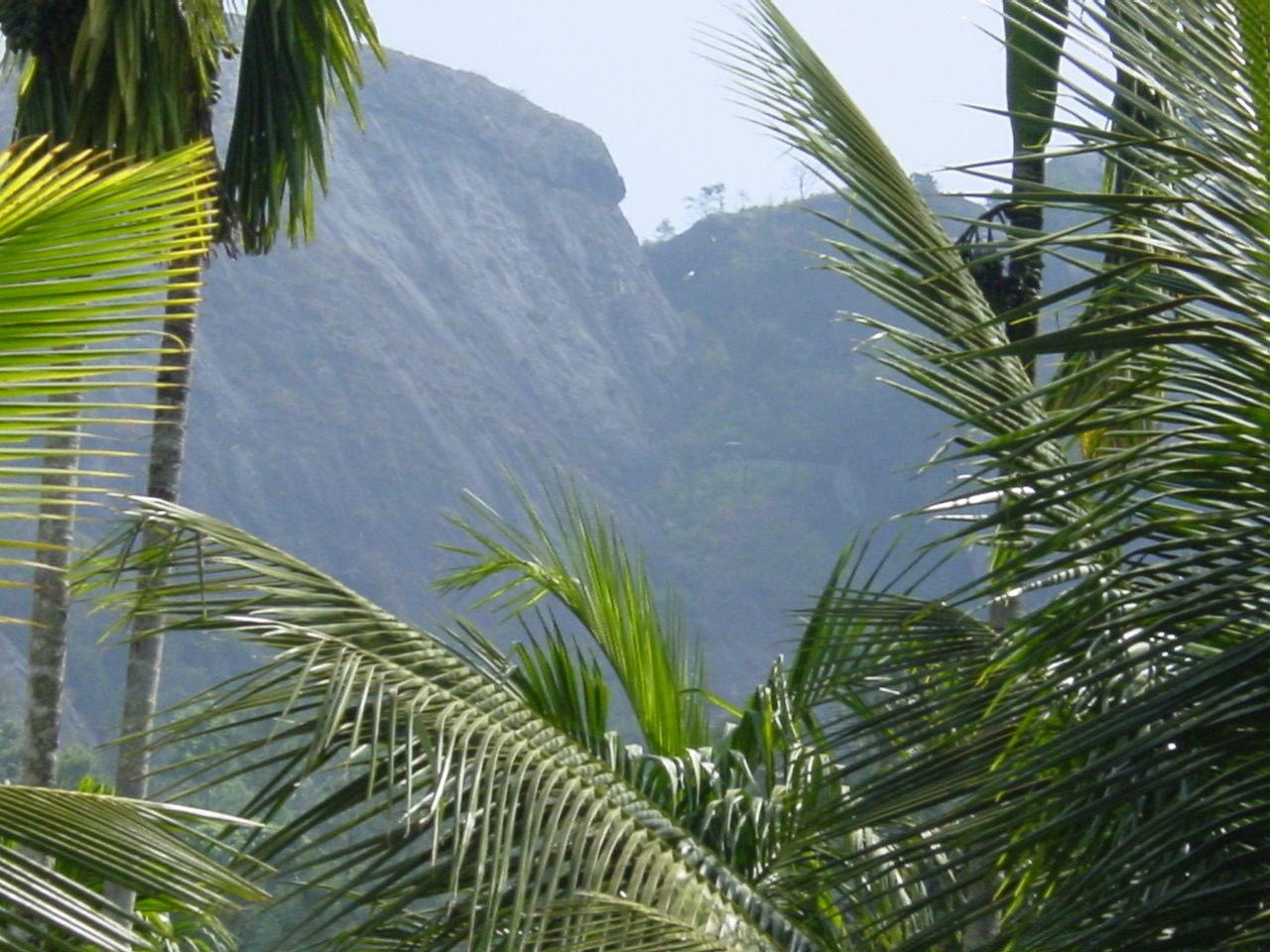
Light shining through Edakkal caves

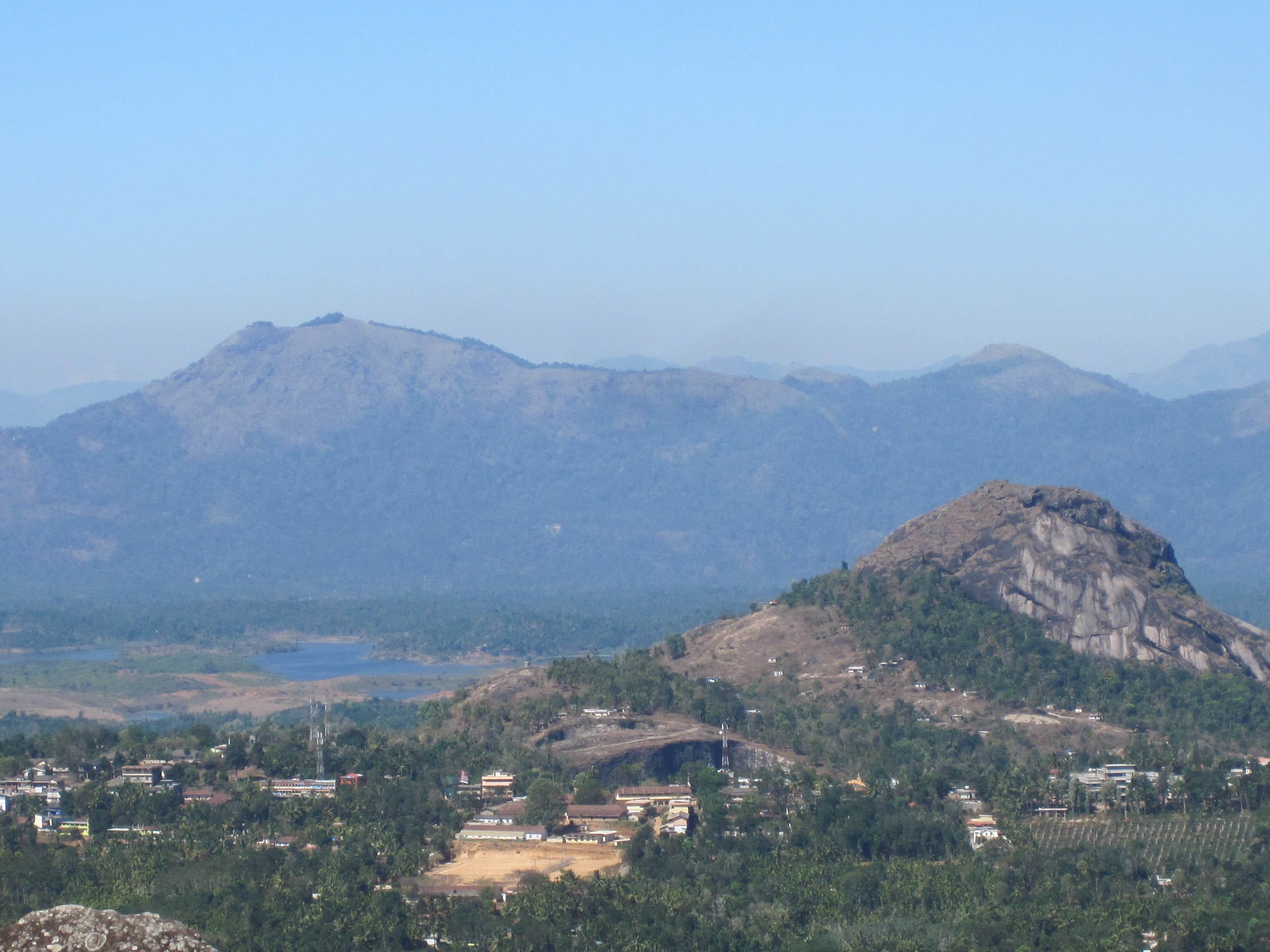
View of surroundings from Edakkal caves.

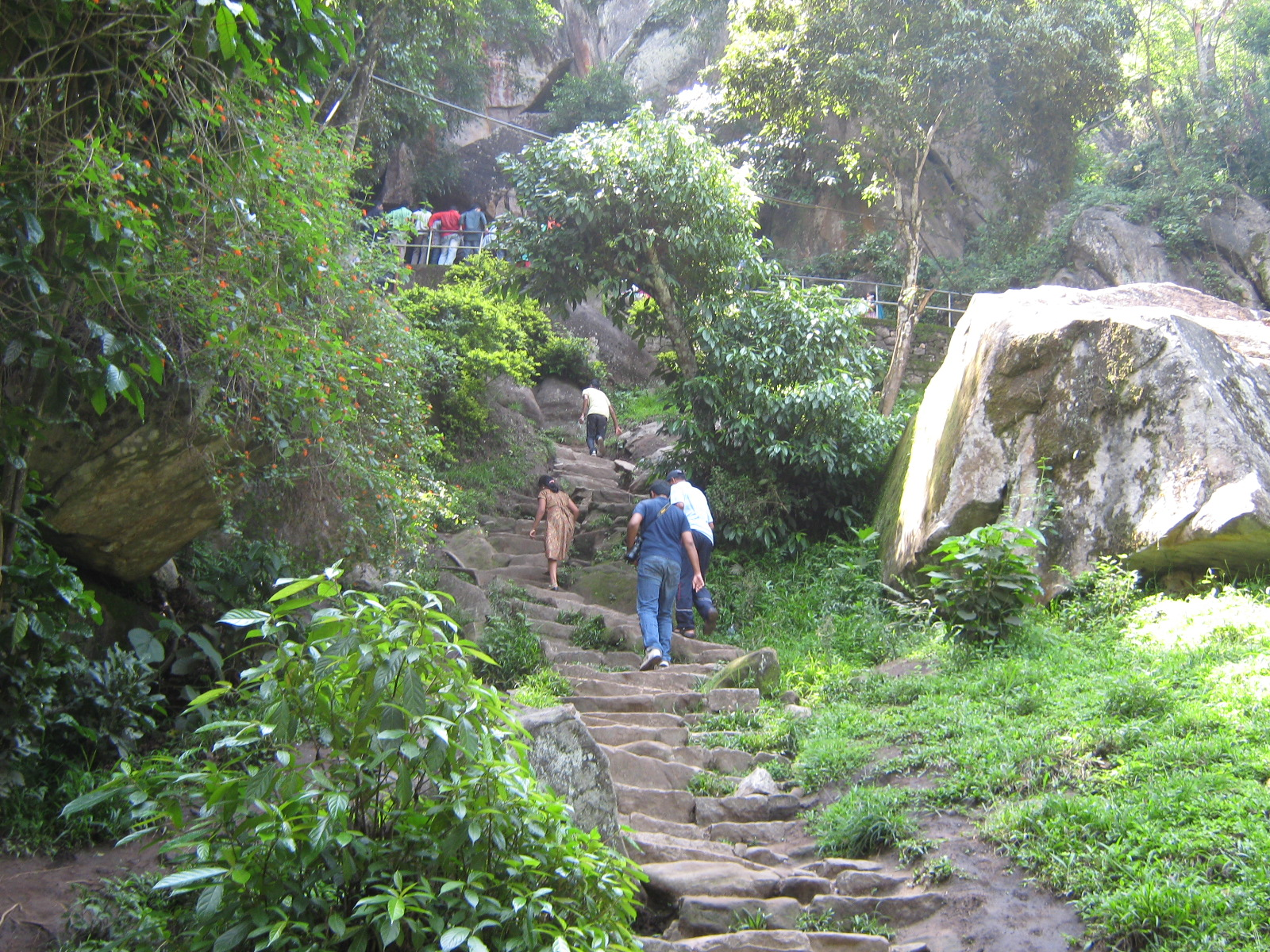
Going up the caves

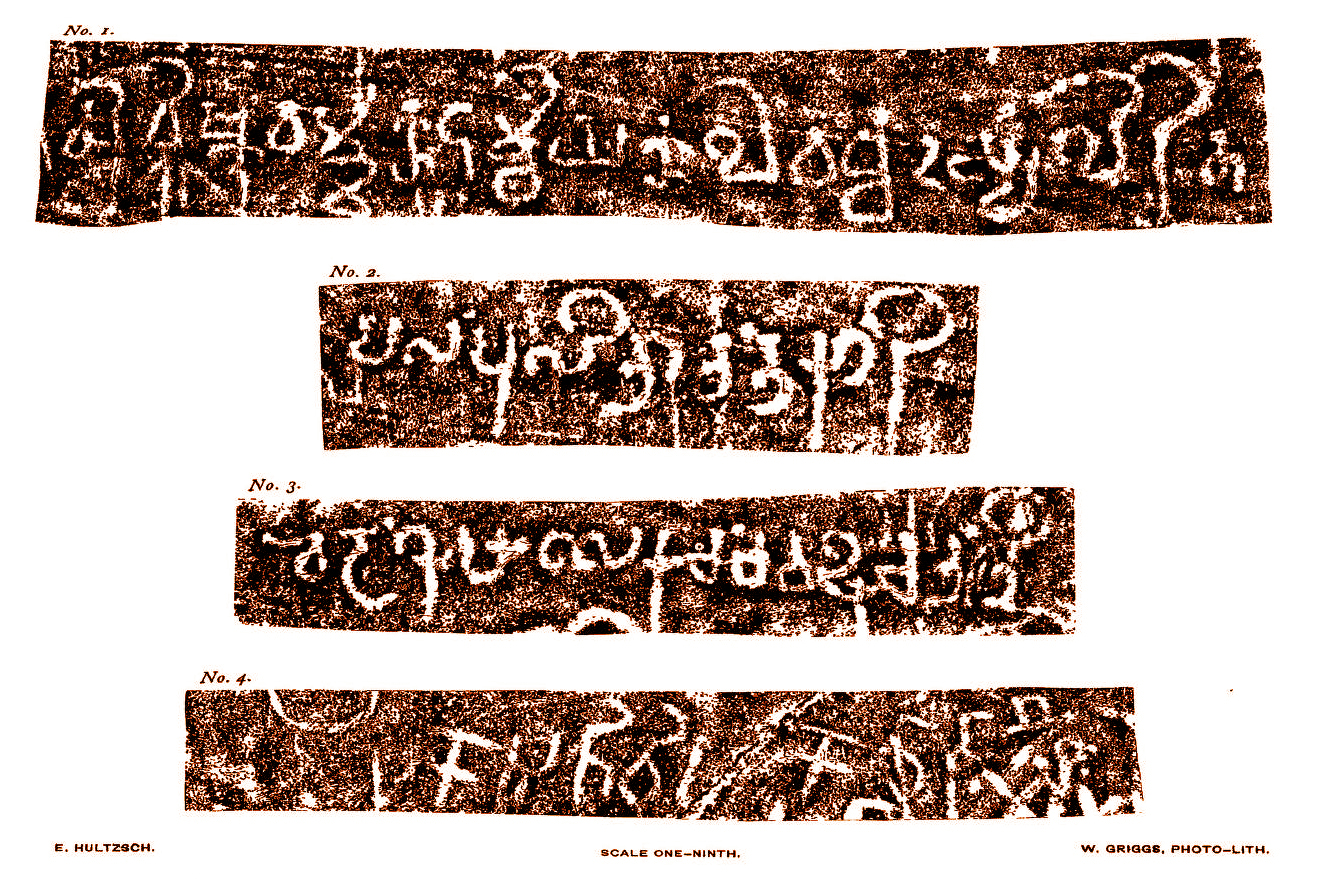
Prakrit Grantha inscription of Kadamba ruler Vishnuvarman (c. 5th-6th century CE) from Edakkal (northern Kerala)
