= Kolathiri =

Royal title in India

Kolathiri or Kolathiri Rājā (Kannada: [koːlɐt̪ːiɾi ɾaːdʒaː]) (King of Kolathunādu or King of Cannanore in foreign accounts) was the title by which the senior-most male along the matrilineal line of the Kolathunādu Royal Family (Kolaswarũpam) based in the North Malabar region was styled. Kolathiri belongs to the Mushika dynasty, who were historically a part of the Nair community of Samantan class.

== Cult of Samantan classral depictions ==
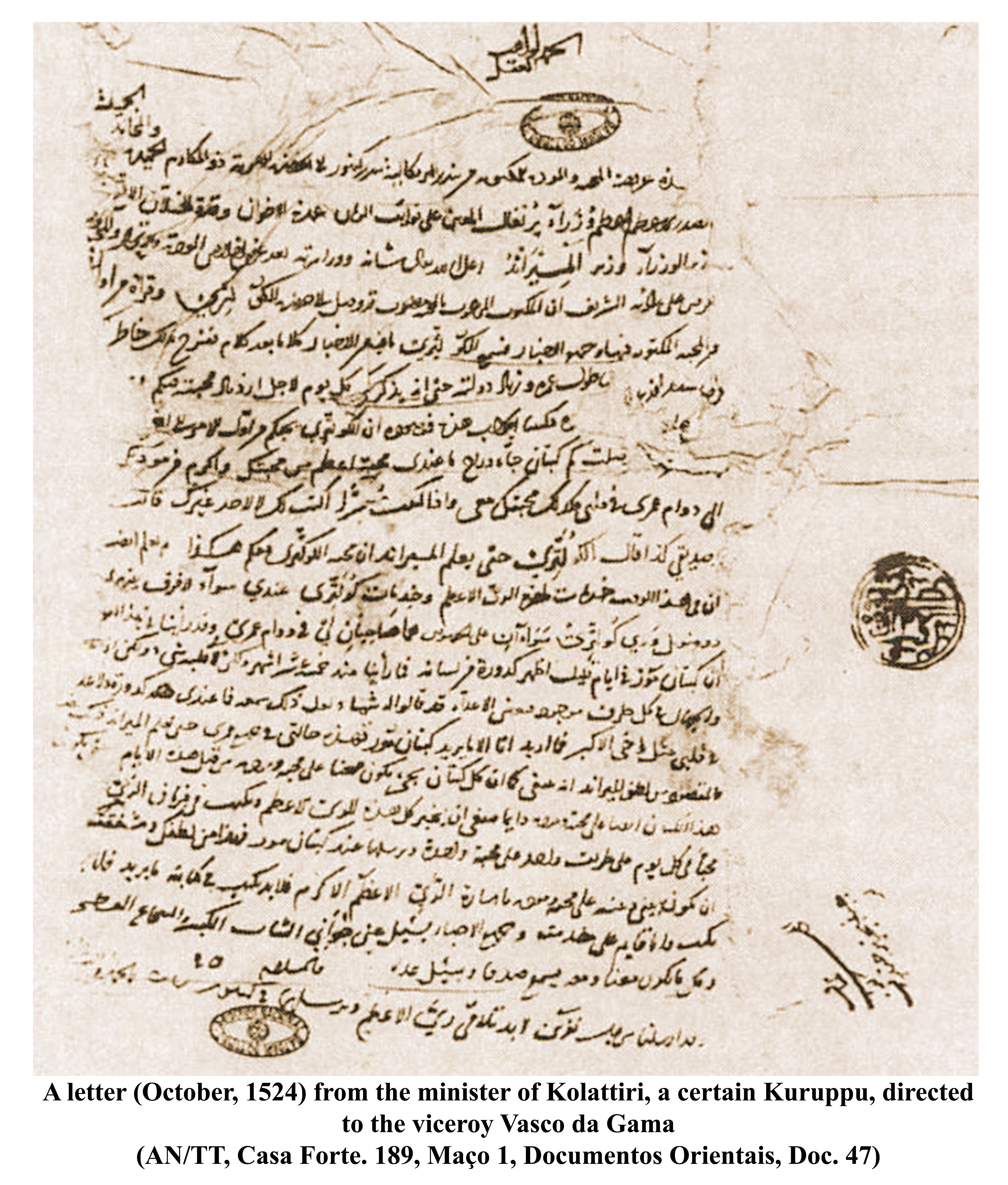
Kolattiri Raja's minister Kuruppu's Arabic letter to Vasco da Gama (1524)

"Kolathiri" appears as a character in a Malayalam film titled Urumi. The film was loosely based on Portuguese interference in north Kerala and the misdeeds committed by Vasco da Gama, who was hailed as a hero in the west but was actually a cold-hearted tyrant to other lands of the spice route; his entry into Kerala politics and manipulating the kingpins and a young Indian who tries to kill Vasco da Gama. The movie was released on 31 March 2011.
