= Bikketti =

Bikketti Bikkatty
- Town Panchayat
- Location in Tamil Nadu, India
- Coordinates: 11°14′47″N 76°37′47″E
- Country: India
- State: Tamil Nadu
- District: The Nilgiris

Area
  - Total: 13 km^{2} (5.0 sq mi)

Population (2011)
  - Total: 5,864
  - Density: 450/km^{2} (1,200/sq mi)

Languages
  - Official: Tamil
- Time zone: UTC+5:30 (IST)
- Postal code: 643209

Bikketti or Bikkatty is a town panchayat of Kundah taluk, Nilgiris district in the Indian state of Tamil Nadu. It is located about 35 km (22 mi) from Ooty. Spread across an area of 13 km^{2} (5.0 sq mi), the town panchayat is divided into 15 wards. It had a population of 5,864 as per the 2011 census.

== Geography ==
Bikketti is a town panchayat in Coonoor taluk of Nilgiris district in the Indian state of Tamil Nadu. It is located approximately 35 km (22 mi) from Ooty, and is bordered by the villages of Kilkunda, Mulligoor, and Ithalar. The town panchayat covers an area of 18.56 km^{2} (7.17 sq mi) and consists of 15 wards and 20 streets.

== Administration and politics ==
The panchayat administration is responsible for providing basic services including maintenance of roads, water supply, health and sanitation. Each ward is represented by a councillor, who is elected through direct elections. Bikketti forms part of the Udagamandalam Assembly constituency that elects its member to the Tamil Nadu legislative assembly and the Nilgiris Lok Sabha constituency that elects its member to the Parliament of India.

== Demographics ==
According to the 2011 census, Bikketti had a population of 5,864 across 1,797 households. The population consisted of 2,824 males and 3,040 females. About 411 (7%) of the population were children aged less than six years. The town panchayat had a literacy rate of approximately 84.7%, with male literacy at 92.7% and female literacy at 77.3%. Scheduled Castes accounted for approximately 34.6% of the population, while Scheduled Tribes accounted for 0.1%.

The working population constituted approximately 56.6% of the total population, comprising 3,319 workers, of whom 1,768 were males and 1,551 were females. Of the total working population, 97% were engaged in main work, while 3% were engaged in marginal work. Hinduism was the predominant religion, practiced by 96.3% of the population, followed by Islam (1.8%) and Christianity (1.4%).

== Infrastructure and services ==
The government runs a primary health center, and a primary school and high school in the town panchayat. Buses connect Bikketti to Ooty via Emerald. The nearest railway station is Udagamandalam railway station located approximately 30 km (19 mi) away.
