= Mulligoor =

- Village
- Mulligoor
- Location in Tamil Nadu, India
- Coordinates: 11.279888°N 76.61894°E
- Country: India
- State: Tamil Nadu
- District: Nilgiris

Languages
  - Official: Badaga
- Time zone: UTC+5:30 (IST)
- PIN: 643209
- Vehicle registration: TN-43
- Nearest city: Coimbatore

Mulligoor is a village in the Kundah taluk of Nilgiris District of Tamil Nadu State, India. It is situated 10 kilometers away from sub-district headquarters Kundah and 30 kilometers from district headquarters Ooty. The main cultivation in Mulligoor is tea growing. This area surrounding Mulligoor is also very rich in wildlife.

The nearest railway station to Mulligoor is Lovedale which is located in and around 14.8 km distance.

Balacola ( 10 km ), Melur ( 10 km ), Nanjanad ( 11 km ), Kuruthukuli ( 14 km ), Lovedale ( 17 km ) are the nearby major villages to Mulligoor. Mulligoor is surrounded by Udhagamandalam Taluk towards North, Coonoor Taluk towards East, Attappadi Taluk towards South, Gudalur Taluk towards North.

== Languages ==
Badaga is the main language for in this village, which is spoken by about 135,000 Badagas in around 200 villages in the Nilgiris.

== Religion ==
Badagas worship several Hindu deities, including Shiva. But their main deity is "Hethai" and they celebrate "Hethai Habba" in a grand fashion which spreads over a month during December–January every year, and the festival is celebrated all over the district. Lakshabba is the major festival of Mulligoor people.

== Demographics ==
The total geographical area of village is 17005.08 hectares.

The total population of Mulligoor village is 4,647 persons out of which 2,301 persons are males and 2,346 persons are females.

== Facilities ==
A Government Elementary school, Post Office, Gym & Sports Ground is present within the village itself.

== Accessibility ==
Mulligoor is accessible only by road. It has very good and dedicated bus connectivity from Ooty, Coonoor, Mettupalayam and also Coimbatore. There are two routes to Ooty. One route is via M.Palada - Ithalar - Emerald. The other route is via Manjoor - Manihatty. The Coonoor route is via Selas - Adhikaratty Junction. The Mettuplayam Bus also passes through the Coonoor route. The Coimbatore Bus uses the Karamadai - Mulli - Manjoor route. This route is the fastest way to reach Coimbatore from Mulligoor.

== Neelakurinji (Kurinji) ==
Strobilanthes kunthiana, kurinji or neelakurinji, blooms in the forests of Mulligoor. Nilgiri Hills, which literally means the blue mountains, got their name from the purplish blue flowers of Neelakurinji that blossoms only once in 12 years.
