= Sholur =

- Town Panchayat
- Location in Tamil Nadu, India
- Coordinates: 11.483331°N 76.656010°E
- Country: India
- State: Tamil Nadu
- District: The Nilgiris

Area
  - Total: 35.08 km^{2} (13.54 sq mi)

Population (2011)
  - Total: 9,745
  - Density: 277.8/km^{2} (719.5/sq mi)

Languages
  - Official: Tamil
- Time zone: UTC+5:30 (IST)

Sholur is a town panchayat in Udagamandalam taluk of Nilgiris district in the Indian state of Tamil Nadu. It is located about 21 km (13 mi) from Ooty. Spread across an area of 35.08 km^{2} (13.54 sq mi), the town panchayat is divided into 15 wards. It had a population of 9,745 as per the 2011 census.

== Geography ==
Sholur is a town panchayat in Udagamandalam taluk of Nilgiris district in the Indian state of Tamil Nadu. It is located approximately 21 km (13 mi) from Ooty. The town panchayat covers an area of 35.08 km^{2} (13.54 sq mi) and consists of 15 wards and 43 streets. It is bordered by Masinagudi to the north, Hullathy to the east, Naduvattam to the west, and Nanjanad (ta) to the south. There are occasional intrusion of wild animals into the town panchayat, leading to human-wildlife conflict and deaths of humans.

== Administration and politics ==
The town panchayat was established in 1932. The panchayat administration is responsible for providing basic services including maintenance of roads, water supply, health and sanitation. Each ward is represented by a councilor elected through direct election. Sholur forms part of the Udagamandalam Assembly constituency that elects its member to the Tamil Nadu legislative assembly and the Nilgiris Lok Sabha constituency that elects its member to the Parliament of India.

== Demographics ==
According to the 2011 census, Sholur had a population of 9,745 across 2,762 households. The population consisted of 4,750 males and 4,995 females. About 986 (10.1%) of the population were children aged less than six years. The town panchayat had a literacy rate of approximately 74%, with male literacy at 85.1% and female literacy at 63.4%. Scheduled Castes accounted for approximately 50.8% of the population, while Scheduled Tribes accounted for 14.2%.

The working population constituted approximately 55.4% of the total population, comprising 5,402 workers, of whom 2,903 were males and 2,499 were females. Of the total working population, 90% were engaged in main work, while 10% were engaged in marginal work.

== Culture and religion ==
According to the 2011 census, Hinduism was the predominant religion, practiced by 94.7% of the population, followed by Islam (1.8%) and Christianity (3.4%). The town panchayat has a Hindu temple dedicated to Mariamman known as the Bokkapuram Mariamman Temple. The annual temple festival is celebrated for four days in February.

== Infrastructure and services ==
Buses reach Sholur from Ooty via Thalaikundah. The nearest railway station is Udagamandalam railway station located approximately 21 km (13 mi) away and the nearest airport is the Coimbatore International Airport. There is a government run primary health center at Sholur. The government runs a primary and high school in the town panchayat. Plastic water bottles are banned in the town panchayat and the government runs two water ATMs to cater to the public.
