= Adikaratti =

Adikaratti Adigaratty
- Town Panchayat
- Location in Tamil Nadu, India
- Coordinates: 11°19′36″N 76°43′11″E
- Country: India
- State: Tamil Nadu
- District: The Nilgiris

Area
  - Total: 18.56 km^{2} (7.17 sq mi)

Population (2011)
  - Total: 14,178
  - Density: 763.9/km^{2} (1,978/sq mi)

Languages
  - Official: Tamil
- Time zone: UTC+5:30 (IST)

Adikaratti or Adigaratty is a town panchayat of Coonoor taluk, Nilgiris district in the Indian state of Tamil Nadu. It is located about 50 km (31 mi) from Ooty. Spread across an area of 18.56 km^{2} (7.17 sq mi), the town panchayat is divided into 18 wards. It had a population of 14,178 as per the 2011 census.

== Geography ==
Adikaratti is a town panchayat in Coonoor taluk of Nilgiris district in the Indian state of Tamil Nadu. It is located approximately 50 km (31 mi) from Ooty, and is bordered by the villages of Huligal, Balacola, and Ketti. The town panchayat covers an area of 18.56 km^{2} (7.17 sq mi) and consists of 18 wards and 52 streets.

== Administration and politics ==
The panchayat administration is responsible for providing basic services including maintenance of roads, water supply, health and sanitation. Adikaratti forms part of the Coonoor Assembly constituency that elects its member to the Tamil Nadu legislative assembly and the Nilgiris Lok Sabha constituency that elects its member to the Parliament of India.

== Demographics ==
According to the 2011 census, Adikaratti had a population of 14,178 across 4,209 households. The population consisted of 6,822 males and 7,356 females. About 1,137 (8%) of the population were children aged less than six years. The town panchayat had a literacy rate of approximately 81.5%, with male literacy at 90.4% and female literacy at 73.3%. Scheduled Castes accounted for approximately 37.5% of the population, while Scheduled Tribes accounted for 1.6%.

The working population constituted approximately 54.4% of the total population, comprising 7,707 workers, of whom 4,261 were males and 3,446 were females. Of the total working population, 95.9% were engaged in main work, while 4.1% were engaged in marginal work. Hinduism was the predominant religion, practiced by 97.2% of the population, followed by Islam (0.9%) and Christianity (1.8%).

== Infrastructure and services ==
The state government runs two public bus services from Coonoor to Adikaratti. Panchayat maintained roads connect Adikaratti with the nearby settlements. The nearest railway station is Udagamandalam railway station located approximately 50 km (31 mi) away. The government runs a primary health center, and a primary school in the town panchayat.
