= Halatty Manithalatty =

Coordinates: 11°27′20″N 76°42′49″E

Halatty Manthalatty is a village in the Indian state of Tamil Nadu, under the Nilgiris District. Halatty Manthalatty is also the name given to a range of mountains spread across the states of Tamil Nadu as well as Karnataka and Kerala. It is one of the small villages in Udhagamandalam Taluk in The Nilgiris District under Kadanad Panchayat. Around 100 families and Around 400 people are living in this village.

== History ==
Halatty Manithalatty village has a history going back many centuries. In this village occupied by Badagas, the major non tribal caste is Badaga.

== Geography and climate ==
Halatty Manithalatty is a small village. It has an area of 200 km^{2}. This village is a hilly region, situated at an elevation of 2,000 to 2,600 meters above sea level. Almost the entire village lies in the Western ghats. Halatty Manithalatty village is bounded by Mysore district, Karnataka and Wayanad district, Kerala in the North, Malappuram and Palakkad districts, Kerala in the West, Coimbatore district, Tamil Nadu in the South.

This Village usually receives rain both during South West Monsoon and North East Monsoon seasons. Udhagamandalam Taluk receive rain by the South West Monsoon and some portion of Udhagamandalam Taluk and the entire Coonoor and Kotagiri Taluks are benefited by the rains of North East Monsoon. There are 16 rainfall registering stations in the district The average annual rainfall of the district is 1,920.80 mm.

Halatty Manithalatty village principal town of the area is Ooty(Udhagamandalam), which is the district capital of Nilgiris. This is the major town for Halatty Manithalatty villagers. They used to go Ooty for buying and selling of goods. Ooty is one of the famous tourist spots in The Nilgiris.

== Village administration ==
Halatty Manithalatty village is under the Udhagamandalam Taluk in The Nilgiris District under Kadanad Panchayat. Kadanad post office is the Branch post office of Halatty Manithalatty village. Denaducombai post office is Head office. Halatty Manithalatty village pincode is 643206. Telephone and STD code is 0423.

== Languages ==
Badaga is the main language for in this village, which has no script and spoken by about 245,000 Badagas in 200 villages in the Nilgiris.

Tamil language is also spoken in this village. Many people speak and understand English, Kannada, Malayalam and Hindi.

== Basic infrastructure ==
=== Transport ===
Halatty Manithalatty village has two main buses from Ooty ATC. Ooty bus stand as the central bus stand for the Halatty Manithalatty village apart from Municipal Bus Stand, Coonoor. The village roads are maintained by Panchayat Union. It will take around 30 minutes to reach Halatty Manithalatty Village from Ooty. Major bus stops include:

1. Collector Office, Ooty
2. Forest Gate
3. Adasolai Village
4. Denadu combai
5. Kadanad Village

=== Health infrastructure ===
Kadanad village is the nearest village. It has the Primary Health Centre. Ooty is the main area for this village's Health infrastructure.

== Agriculture ==
Agriculture is the most common work for all. Halatty Manithalatty village used to develop the Horticulture field, and the economy of the village depends upon the success and failure of crops like potato, beans, beetroot, carrot, tea. This village also produces eucalyptus oil and here living people doing their own business such like as tourism guide, fertilizers shop, etc.

== Education ==
In past, Halatty Manithalatty villagers did not have much interest in studies; nowadays they having more interest. Around 77.3% of the population are educated according to the 2013 census. Halatty Manithalatty village is surrounded schools and colleges.

=== Government School's ===
1. Government High School, Kadanad
2. Government Higher Sec School, Anikorai
3. Government Higher Sec School, Thuneri

=== Private Schools ===
1. Sathya sai matriculation school, Thuneri
2. Gurukulam matriculation school, Thuneri
3. Annai Saradha Devi matriculation school, Anikorai

=== Colleges ===
1. Government Arts and Science College, Ooty
2. CSI Engineering College, Ketti

== Festival ==
Halatty Manithalatty village grand festival is "Thaipusam", held every year. Vinayagar chaturthi is also one of the festival for this people.
