= Jagathala =

Jagathala Jegathala
- Village
- Location in Tamil Nadu, India
- Coordinates: 11°24′16″N 76°46′58″E
- Country: India
- State: Tamil Nadu
- District: The Nilgiris

Area
  - Total: 17.88 km^{2} (6.90 sq mi)

Population (2011)
  - Total: 14,383
  - Density: 804.4/km^{2} (2,083/sq mi)

Languages
  - Official: Tamil
- Time zone: UTC+5:30 (IST)
- Vehicle registration: TN 43

Jagathala or Jegathala is a town panchayat in Kotagiri taluk, Nilgiris district in the Indian state of Tamil Nadu. It is located about 12 km (7.5 mi) from Ooty. Spread across an area of 17.88 km^{2} (6.90 sq mi), the town panchayat is divided into 15 wards. It had a population of 14,383 as per the 2011 census.

== Geography ==
Jagathala is a town panchayat in Kotagiri taluk of Nilgiris district in the Indian state of Tamil Nadu. It is located on the northeastern edge of the Nilgiri mountains off the road connecting Ooty and Mettupalayam, approximately 12 km (7.5 mi) from Ooty, and 38 km (24 mi) from Mettupalayam. The town panchayat covers an area of 17.88 km^{2} (6.90 sq mi) and consists of 18 wards and 35 streets. It is bordered by Thummanatty (ta) to the east, Hubbathala to the west, Naduhatty (ta) to the north, and Ketti to the south.

Jagathala is located at an altitude of approximately 2,000 m (6,600 ft). It receives about 70 in (1,800 mm) of rainfall annually. Most of the rainfall occurs during the northeast monsoon in October–November. The eastern part of the town panchayat is covered by thick forest cover. The town panchayat is prone to landslides and rock falls, and occasional intrusion of wildlife.

== Administration and politics ==
The panchayat administration is responsible for providing basic services including maintenance of roads, water supply, health and sanitation. Jagathala forms part of the Coonoor Assembly constituency that elects its member to the Tamil Nadu legislative assembly and the Nilgiris Lok Sabha constituency that elects its member to the Parliament of India.

== Demographics ==
According to the 2011 census, Jagathala had a population of 14,383 across 4,099 households. The population consisted of 6,904 males and 7,479 females. About 1,316 (9.2%) of the population were children aged less than six years. The town panchayat had a literacy rate of approximately 88.6%, with male literacy at 94.8% and female literacy at 82.9%. Scheduled Castes accounted for approximately 22.2% of the population, while Scheduled Tribes accounted for 0.2%.

== Culture and religion ==
According to the 2011 census, Hinduism was the predominant religion, practiced by 76% of the population, followed by Christianity (17.8%) and Islam (6.1%). The town panchayat has a Hindu temple dedicated to Mariamman known as the Neela Mariamman Temple. The annual temple festival is celebrated in January.

== Economy ==
Tea is grown extensively within the town panchayat. Other crops include vegetables like potato, and cabbage. There is a cordite factory run by the Ministry of Defence in the town panchayat, which also hosts a shooting range of the Indian Army.

The working population constituted approximately 39% of the total population, comprising 5,613 workers, of whom 3,878 were males and 1,735 were females. Of the total working population, 89.9% were engaged in main work, while 10.1% were engaged in marginal work.

== Infrastructure and services ==
The nearest railway station is Coonoor railway station located approximately 6 km (3.7 mi) away and the nearest airport is the Coimbatore International Airport. The government runs a middle school in the town panchayat. Plastic water bottles are banned in the town panchayat and the government runs a water ATM to cater to the public.
