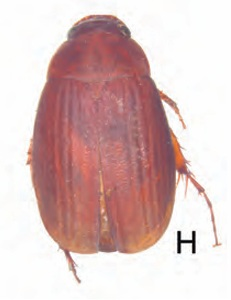

Scientific classification
- Kingdom: Animalia
- Phylum: Arthropoda
- Class: Insecta
- Order: Coleoptera
- Suborder: Polyphaga
- Infraorder: Scarabaeiformia
- Family: Scarabaeidae
- Genus: Maladera
- Species: M. naduvatamensis

Binomial name
- Maladera naduvatamensis Ahrens & Fabrizi, 2016

= Maladera naduvatamensis =

Species of beetle

Maladera naduvatamensis is a species of beetle of the family Scarabaeidae. It is found in India (Tamil Nadu).

== Description ==
Adults reach a length of about 7.9–8.1 mm. They have a dark reddish brown, oblong-oval body with yellowish antennae. They are mostly dull and the dorsal surface is nearly glabrous, except for some setae on the head.

== Etymology ==
The species is named after its type locality, Naduvatam.
