= Kappathorai =

Village in Tamil Nadu, India

- Village
- Location in Tamil Nadu, India Kappathorai (India)
- Coordinates: 11.368173290260279°N 76.65655105934651°E
- Country: India
- State: Tamil Nadu
- District: Nilgiris

Language(s)
  - Official: Tamil
- Time zone: UTC+5:30 (IST)
- Postal code: 627101

Kappathorai is a village near Ooty in the state of Tamil Nadu, India. It is located in Nilgiris district.

== Economy ==
Agriculture is an important sector of Kappathorai's economy. The village has carrot and potato fields. The other significant crop is cabbage.

Kappathorai falls within Sillahalla Watershed where soil erosion has been a significant concern.
