= Nambolakotta Temple =

The Nambalakod Temple is an ancient shrine complex in India situated in Gudalur, Nilgiri District in northwestern Tamil Nadu, where the tribal deity is the Betarayasvami or "Lord of the Hunt". The Nambalakotta Temple is significant to the cultural ethos, religious life, and rituals of the Mandadan Chettis.
