= Huligal =

Huligal Hulical
- Town Panchayat
- Location in Tamil Nadu, India
- Coordinates: 11°19′08″N 76°47′25″E
- Country: India
- State: Tamil Nadu
- District: The Nilgiris
- Taluk: Coonoor

Area
  - Total: 35.41 km^{2} (13.67 sq mi)

Population (2011)
  - Total: 12,960
  - Density: 366.0/km^{2} (947.9/sq mi)

Languages
  - Official: Tamil
- Time zone: UTC+5:30 (IST)

Huligal or Hulical is a town panchayat in Coonoor taluk, Nilgiris district in the Indian state of Tamil Nadu. It is located about 28 km (17 mi) from Ooty. Spread across an area of 35.41 km^{2} (13.67 sq mi), the town panchayat is divided into 18 wards. It had a population of 12,960 as per the 2011 census.

== Geography ==
Huligal is a town panchayat in Coonoor taluk of Nilgiris district in the Indian state of Tamil Nadu. It is located approximately 28 km (17 mi) from Ooty, and 6 km (3.7 mi) from Coonoor. The town panchayat covers an area of 35.41 km^{2} (13.67 sq mi) and consists of 18 wards and 33 streets.

Huligal is known for its tea plantations. The town panchayat often faces issues of human-wildlife conflict, which results in deaths. The town panchayat receives heavy rainfall during the monsoons which results in flooding and damage to infrastructure.

== Administration and politics ==
Huligal town panchayat was established on 19 January 1932 and was upgraded as a selection grade (annual revenue between 10 to 20 million) town panchayat on 22 October 1970. The panchayat administration is responsible for providing basic services including maintenance of roads, water supply, health and sanitation. Huligal forms part of the Coonoor Assembly constituency that elects its member to the Tamil Nadu legislative assembly and the Nilgiris Lok Sabha constituency that elects its member to the Parliament of India.

== Demographics and economy ==
According to the 2011 census, Huligal had a population of 12,960 across 3,727 households. The population consisted of 6,440 males and 6,520 females. About 1,113 (8.6%) of the population were children aged less than six years. The town panchayat had a literacy rate of approximately 83.3%, with male literacy at 90.4% and female literacy at 76.3%. Scheduled Castes accounted for approximately 59.3% of the population, while Scheduled Tribes accounted for 6.7%.

The working population constituted approximately 54.9% of the total population, comprising 7,111 workers, of whom 3,875 were males and 3,236 were females. Of the total working population, 94.4% were engaged in main work, while 5.6% were engaged in marginal work. Hinduism was the predominant religion, practiced by 87.1% of the population, followed by Christianity (11.8%) and Islam (0.9%).

== Infrastructure and services ==
Huligal is connected by road to Coonoor via Katary and Glendale. The nearest railway station is Coonoor railway station located approximately 10 km (6.2 mi) away and the nearest airport is the Coimbatore International Airport. There is a primary school, and a public high school in the town panchayat.
