= Forest Dale, Nilgiris district =

Coordinates: 11.3660435°N 76.7978937°E

Forest Dale is a small village near Coonoor in The Nilgiris District in Tamil Nadu. It is 1 km from Defence Services Staff College (DSSC), the officers training for the Indian Armed Forces and about 3.5 km from Coonoor.
