= Kuruthukuli =

Village in Ooty, Tamil Nadu, India

Kuruthukuli is a small village in Ooty, The Nilgiris, Tamil Nadu. Located in 10 km from the Ooty town, this village is already in the Guinness Book of Records for planting the most number of tree saplings by village people in a single day. Being just near the Parsons Valley, this village is a beautiful place to live in and to visit.
