= Coonoor block =

Revenue block in Tamil Nadu, India

Coordinates: 11.35°N 76.82°E

The Coonoor block is a revenue block in the Nilgiris District of Tamil Nadu, India. It has a total of 6 panchayat villages.
