= Nelliyalam =

- Town
- Location in Tamil Nadu, India Nelliyalam (India)
- Coordinates: 11°29′50″N 76°22′33″E
- Country: India
- State: Tamil Nadu
- Region: Kongu Nadu
- District: The Nilgiris

Population (2011)
  - Total: 44,590

Languages
  - Official: Tamil
- Time zone: UTC+5:30 (IST)

Nelliyalam is a municipality in The Nilgiris district in the Indian state of Tamil Nadu. As of 2011, the town had a population of 44,590.

The taluk headquarters of Pandalur and Devala (located in Gudalur taluk) are part of Nelliyalam municipality.

== History ==
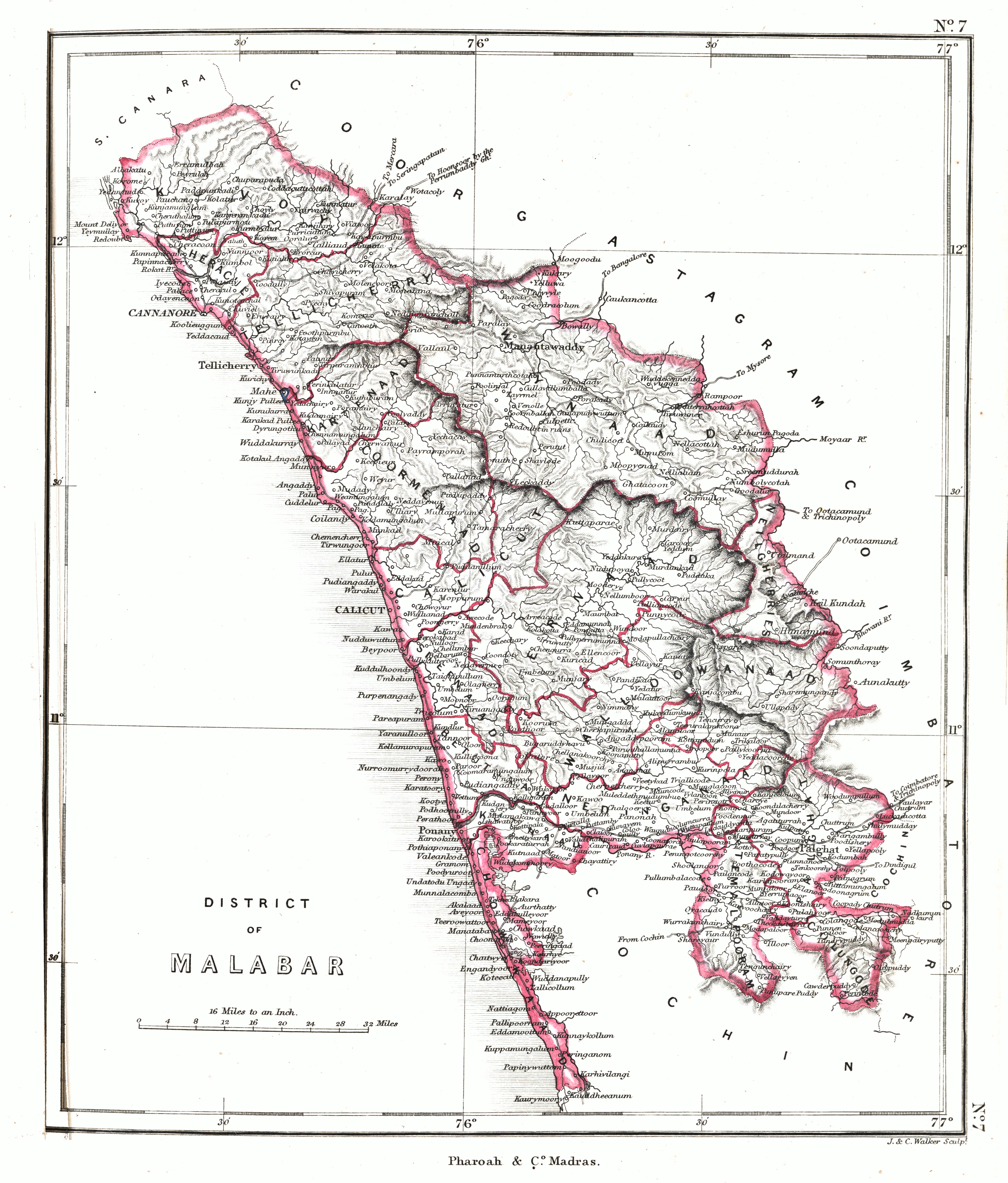
An old map of Malabar District (1854). Note that the taluks Pandalur, Gudalur, and Kundah in present-day Nilgiris district were parts of Wayanad Taluk in 1854. The Taluks of Malabar were rearranged in 1860 and 1877.

The Gudalur and Pandalur taluks of Nilgiris district one time together constituted the Southeast Wayanad. The total area of Gudalur and the neighboring town of Pandalur is approximately 124,800 acres. In medieval times, before the arrival of the British, the area was divided between three rulers: Vallavanoor, the leader of the Panniyas, Nelliarasi, another adivasi ruler, and the Nilambur Kovilakam, a kingdom based in present-day Kerala. Subsequently, the Kovilakam decided to expand its borders by conquering the other two areas. Vallavanoor was killed and Nelliarasi kidnapped and forced to hand over her lands. Despite some resistance from Vallavanoor's community, the Kovilakam succeeded in subjugating the area and taking approximately 100,000 acres under its control. Gudalur was actually a part of Kerala and Malabar District until 1877. In 1877, it was transferred to Nilgiris district only because of the heavy size of Malabar District and small size of Nilgiris district. Actually Gudalur was the southeastern region in Wayanad during the British rule. Though this Malayalam majority region was transferred to Nilgiris, the court and official language in this region continued to be Malayalam. In modern times, the recognized extent of the Kovilakam's holdings was 80,087 acres under the Malabar Tenancy Act, until 1969. This area is known as 'janmom' land. Kovilakam constructed a temple named Nambalakottai and handed over to Moundadan Chetty community. Chetty community is one of the oldest community in Gudalur where most of their community still have 'Rani Patta' as a proof of oldest community. They have their own tradition and languages.

=== Pre-history ===
Historians believe that the human settlements existed in these parts for at least ten centuries before Christ. Much evidence of New Stone Age civilisation can be seen in the hills throughout the present day Wayanad district. The Edakkal Caves has 6000-year-old rock engravings from the Neolithic age. The recorded history of this district is available only from the 18th century. In ancient times, this land was ruled by the Rajas of the Veda tribe.

=== Ezhimala kingdom ===
In the earliest part of the recorded history of Gudalur region, Wayanad District, Kasaragod-Kannur-Wayanad-Kozhikode Districts in the northern part of present-day Kerala were ruled by the Nannans (Mushika dynasty) who later came to be known as the Kolathiris. Politically the area was part of the Ezhimala Kingdom with its Capital at Ezhimala in present day Kannur district. The most famous King of Ezhimala was Nannan whose Kingdom extended up to Gudalur, Nilgiris and northern parts of Coimbatore. It is said that Nannan took refuge at Wayanad hills in the 5th century CE when he was lost to Cheras, just before his execution in a battle, according to the Sangam works. Wayanad was a part of the Karkanad which included the eastern regions of Ezhimala kingdom (Wayanad-Gudalur areas including part of Kodagu (Coorg)). Karkanad along with Poozhinadu, which contained much of the coastal belt wedged between Mangalore and Kozhikode was under Ezhimala kingdom with the headquarters at Ezhimala.

=== Kolathunadu ===
The Mooshaka Kings were considered descendants of Nannan. By the 14th century, Mooshaka Kingdom was known as Kolathirinad and the Rulers as Kolathiris. The Kolathunad Kingdom at the peak of its power reportedly extended from Kasaragod in the north to Korapuzha in the south with Arabian Sea on the west and Kodagu hills on the eastern boundary.

=== Kingdom of Kottayam ===
The Kolathiri Dominion emerged into independent 10 principalities i.e., Kadathanadu (Vadakara), Randathara or Poyanad (Dharmadom), Kottayam (Thalassery), Nileshwaram, Iruvazhinadu (Panoor), Kurumbranad etc., under separate royal chieftains due to the outcome of internal dissensions. The Nileshwaram dynasty on the northernmost part of Kolathiri dominion, were relatives to both Kolathunadu as well as Zamorin of Calicut, in the early medieval period. The origin of Kottayam Royal Family (the Kottayam referred here is Kottayam-Malabar near Thalassery, not to be confused with Kottayam in Southern Kerala) is lost in obscurity. It has been stated that the Raja of Kottayam set up a semi-independent principality of his own at the expense of Kolathiris. In the 10th century AD, the region comprised erstwhile Taluks of Kottayam, Wayanad and Gudallur was called Puraikizhanad and its feudal lord Puraikizhars. The Thirunelly Inscriptions refer to the division of Puraikizhar Family into two branches viz., Elder (Muthukur) and Younger (Elamkur) in the beginning of the 11th century. In 17th century Kottayam-Malabar was the Capital of Puraikizhanad (Puranattukara) Rajas. It was divided into three branches i.e., Eastern, Western and Southern under separate dignitaries known as Mootha, Elaya and Munnarkur Rajas. The Kottayam Rajas extended their influence up to the border of Kodagu. By the end of the 17th century, they shared the area of Thalassery Taluk with the Iruvazhinadu Nambiars and were in possession of North Wayanad and the small Village of Thamarassery which formed the Eastern portion of the present Vadakara, Quilandy and Thamarassery Taluks.

=== Carnatic invasions into Wayanad and Gudalur ===
In 930 AD, emperor Erayappa of Ganga Dynasty led his troops to south west of Mysore and after conquering, called it Bayalnad meaning the land of swamps. After Erayappa, his sons Rachamalla and Battunga fought each other for the new kingdom of their father's legacy. Rachamalla was killed and Battunga became the undisputed ruler of Bayalnad. In the 12th century AD, Gangas were dethroned from Bayalnad by Kadamba dynasty of North Canara. In 1104 AD Vishnuvardhana of Hoysala invaded Bayalnad followed by Vijayanagara dynasty in the 16th century. In 1610 AD, Udaiyar Raja Wadiyar of Mysore drove out Vijayanagara General and became the ruler of Bayalnad and the Nilgiris. Bayalnad is the present Wayanad.

==== Mysore Sultans ====
When Wayanad was under Hyder Ali's rule, the ghat road from Vythiri to Thamarassery was invented. Then the British rulers developed this route to Carter road. After Hyder Ali, his son Tipu Sultan took control over the territory.

==== Colonial era ====
Kundah taluk was transferred from Malabar to Coimbatore in 1860. Southeast Wayanad region of Wayanad Taluk in Malabar District was the regions included in the Gudalur and Pandalur Taluks of present Nilgiris district. Southeast Wynad was a part of Malabar District until 31 March 1877, when it was transferred to the neighbouring Nilgiris district due to the heavy population of Malabar and the small area of Nilgiris. It consisted of the following 3 Amsoms.

- Munnanad
- Nambalakode
- Cherankode

During the mid-19th century, English companies began mining for gold in the area, mostly in Devala and Pandalur. A London-based mining company created a township in Pandalur that began with a church, post office, shops, and a race course. After the gold boom, the mining business gradually fell into decline because the percentage of gold ore was below the average. Even so, mining was continued until the beginning of the 20th century.

Once the British companies had determined that gold mining would not succeed in this area, thus changing to agricultural industries and created tea plantations on a massive scale. The climate and soil were well suited for tea, which helped to ensure the success of the new industry. Coffee and tea plantation started at Pandalur area in the early eighteenth century during this time many European planters settled in the Nilgiris and Wyanad to establish tea and coffee estates. D.H.McLeod and Henry Atzenwiler are few among them.

Kunjalikutty Haji of Pandalur was one of the leading manpower suppliers for British estates.

Kunalikutty Haji - A family photo 1930

He brought a large number of people from Malabar to work on the estates, and became very close to the British administration, being recognized as Khan Bahadur Kunajalikutty. During this period in India, the non-cooperation movement against the British was in full swing. The Mappila rebels were agitated over the Khilafat issue, and determined to eliminate the people among the community who supported the British Raj. A group of Khilafat rebels went to Pandalur and completely destroyed the shop owned by Kunalikutty Haji, though his life was saved by his friend Malla Gawdar, chief of the Badagas community in Pandalur.

Most of the land in this area was the property of the princely states of Nilambur, Kovilagam, and Mysoor Maharaj. The Nelliyalam Rani administered the region for Mysoor Maharaj and enjoyed the highest rank in society. The remains of the Nelliayalam Ranis fort can still be viewed in the Nelliayalam village.

Pandalur was believed to be a sacred place for the aboriginal communities such as the Paniyas, Kurumbas, and Kattu Nayakkans. It was then dominated by the Gowdar community. In Ponnani, near the village of Nelliyalkam, there is a century-old temple (Sree Maha Vishnu Temple) constructed in the unique Kerala temple architecture. The migration of Malabar people had a major impact on the area, including the social, cultural, economic, and environmental systems.

== Demographics ==
Religious census
Religion	Percent(%)
Hindu	79.85%
Muslim	14.42%
Christian	5.69%
Sikh	0.02%

According to 2011 census, Nelliyalam had a population of 44,590 with a sex-ratio of 1,035 females for every 1,000 males, much above the national average of 929. A total of 4,717 were under the age of six, constituting 2,371 males and 2,346 females. Scheduled Castes and Scheduled Tribes accounted for 58.49% and 4.% of the population respectively. The average literacy of the town was 77.99%, compared to the national average of 72.99%. The town had a total of 10729 households. There were a total of 19,320 workers, comprising 101 cultivators, 1,565 main agricultural labourers, 61 in house hold industries, 14,972 other workers, 2,621 marginal workers, 7 marginal cultivators, 367 marginal agricultural labourers, 22 marginal workers in household industries and 2,225 other marginal workers. As per the religious census of 2011, Nelliyalam had 79.85% Hindus, 14.42% Muslims, 5.69% Christians, 0.02% Sikhs and 0.03% following other religions.
