= Udagamandalam block =

Coordinates: 11.41°N 76.70°E

The Udagamandalam block is a revenue block in the Nilgiris District of Tamil Nadu, India. It has a total of 13 panchayat villages.
