= Kotagiri block =

The Kotagiri block is a revenue block in the Nilgiris District of Tamil Nadu, India. It has a total of 11 panchayat villages.
