= Kilkunda =

Kilkunda Kil Kundah
- Town Panchayat
- Location in Tamil Nadu, India
- Coordinates: 11°15′25″N 76°40′11″E
- Country: India
- State: Tamil Nadu
- District: The Nilgiris

Area
  - Total: 24.21 km^{2} (9.35 sq mi)

Population (2011)
  - Total: 8,886
  - Density: 367.0/km^{2} (950.6/sq mi)

Languages
  - Official: Tamil
- Time zone: UTC+5:30 (IST)

Kilkunda or Kil Kundah is a town panchayat in Nilgiris district in the Indian state of Tamil Nadu. Located about 33 km (21 mi) from Ooty, it is the headquarters of Kundah taluk. Spread across an area of 17.88 km^{2} (6.90 sq mi), the town panchayat is divided into 15 wards. It had a population of 14,383 as per the 2011 census.

== Geography ==
Kilkunda is a town panchayat in Nilgiris district in the Indian state of Tamil Nadu. It is the headquarters of Kundah taluk, which consists of ten revenue villages. It is located approximately 33 km (21 mi) from Ooty, and bordered by Melkundah (ta) to the west, Balacola (ta) to the north, and Bikketti to the south. The town panchayat covers an area of 24.21 km^{2} (9.35 sq mi) and consists of 15 wards and 26 streets.

== Administration and politics ==
The panchayat administration is responsible for providing basic services including maintenance of roads, water supply, health and sanitation. Each ward is represented by a councilor elected through direct election. Kilkunda forms part of the Udagamandalam Assembly constituency that elects its member to the Tamil Nadu legislative assembly and the Nilgiris Lok Sabha constituency that elects its member to the Parliament of India.

== Demographics ==
According to the 2011 census, Kilkunda had a population of 8,886 across 2,636 households. The population consisted of 4,280 males and 4,606 females. About 638 (7.2%) of the population were children aged less than six years. The town panchayat had a literacy rate of approximately 85.7%, with male literacy at 92.7% and female literacy at 79.3%. Scheduled Castes accounted for approximately 37.5% of the population, while Scheduled Tribes accounted for 1.7%.

The working population constituted approximately 52.9% of the total population, comprising 4,697 workers, of whom 2,637 were males and 2,060 were females. Of the total working population, 94.59% were engaged in main work, while 5.41% were engaged in marginal work.

== Culture and religion ==
According to the 2011 census, Hinduism was the predominant religion, practiced by 91.5% of the population, followed by Islam (4.1%) and Christianity (4.1%). The town panchayat has a Hindu temple dedicated to Annamalai. The annual kavadi festival is celebrated during the Tamil calendar month of Chithirai (April).

== Infrastructure and services ==
Kilkunda is connected by buses plying between Ooty and Manjoor. The nearest railway station is Udagamandalam railway station located approximately 33 km (21 mi) away and the nearest airport is the Coimbatore International Airport. There is a public hospital at Kilkunda. There is a government run middle school and a private high school in the town panchayat. Plastic water bottles are banned in the town panchayat and the government runs a water ATM to cater to the public.
