= Gudalur block =

Coordinates: 11.50°N 76.50°E

The Gudalur block is a revenue block in the Nilgiris District of Tamil Nadu, India. It has a total of 5 panchayat villages.
