= Udagamandalam taluk =

Coordinates: 11.41°N 76.70°E

Udagamandalam taluk is a taluk of Nilgiris district of the Indian state of Tamil Nadu. The headquarters of the taluk is the town named Udagamandalam

== Demographics ==
According to the 2011 census, the taluk of Udagamandalam had a population of 191,797 with 93,639 males and 98,158 females. There were 1048 women for every 1000 men. The taluk had a literacy rate of 76.44. Child population in the age group below 6 was 7,489 Males and 7,530 Females. The Udhagmandalam Taluk Is The most populus Taluk and Largest Urbanized area of The Nilagiri District
