= Kotagiri taluk =

Coordinates: 11.42°N 76.86°E

Kotagiri taluk is a taluk of Nilgiris district of the Indian state of Tamil Nadu. The headquarters of the taluk is the town of Kotagiri.

== Demographics ==
According to the 2011 census, the taluk of Kotagiri had a population of 108,290 with 52,543 males and 55,747 females. There were 1061 women for every 1000 men. The taluk had a literacy rate of 77.01. Child population in the age group below 6 was 4,277 Males and 4,154 Females.
