= Ithalar =

Coordinates: 11.3429°N 76.6360°E

- village
- Interactive map of Ithalar
- Country: India
- State: Tamil Nadu
- District: Nilgiris

Languages
  - Official: Tamil
- Time zone: UTC+5:30 (IST)
- Vehicle registration: TN-43
- Coastline: 0 kilometres (0 mi)
- Nearest city: ooty

Ithalar is a village in the Kundah Taluk of Nilgiris district in Tamil Nadu. It is about 16 kilometres from Ooty. The main cultivation in Ithalar is tea growing and agriculture with carrot cultivation being the main occupation. It has a population of 1,500 with 350 houses.
