= Naduvattam, Tamil Nadu =

Naduvattam
- Town
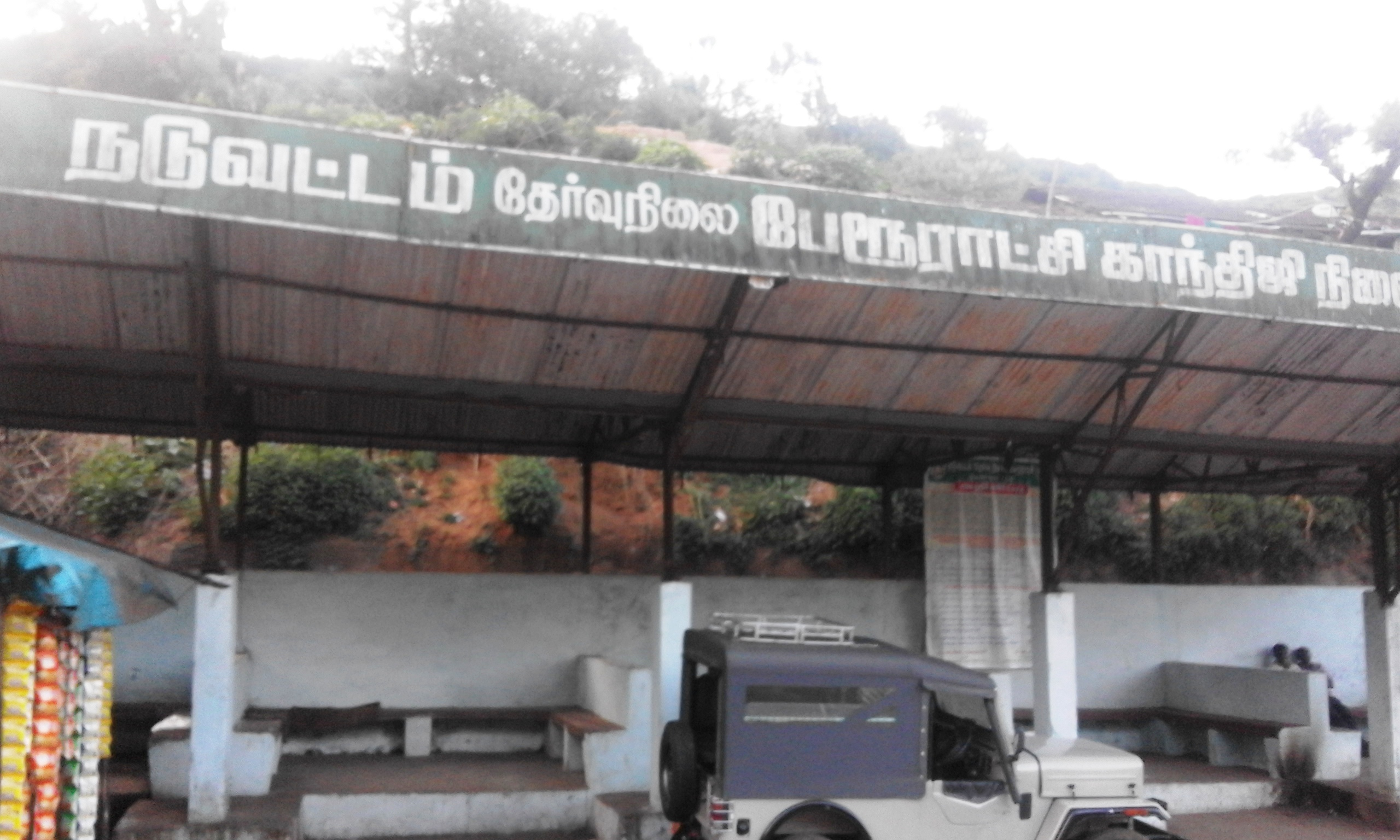
- Naduvattam

- Location in Tamil Nadu, India
- Coordinates: 11.48°N 76.57°E
- Country: India
- State: Tamil Nadu
- District: The Nilgiris
- Elevation: 1,953 m (6,407 ft)

Population (2001)
  - Total: 11,706

Languages
  - Official: Tamil, kannada
- Time zone: UTC+5:30 (IST)
- Vehicle registration: TN-43

Naduvattam is a Panchayat town in The Nilgiris district in the Indian state of Tamil Nadu. It is located on Coimbatore-Gundalpet National Highway NH 67 of the Nilgiri Ghat Roads.

== History ==
In the 19th century, when the British Straits Settlement shipped Chinese convicts to be jailed in India, the Chinese men then settled in the Nilgiri mountains near Naduvattam after their release and married Tamil Paraiyan women, having mixed Chinese-Tamil children with them. They were documented by Edgar Thurston. Paraiyan is also anglicized as "pariah".

Edgar Thurston described the colony of the Chinese men with their Tamil pariah wives and children: "Halting in the course of a recent anthropological expedition on the western side of the Nilgiri plateau, in the midst of the Government Cinchona plantations, I came across a small settlement of Chinese, who have squatted for some years on the slopes of the hills between Naduvatam and Gudalur, and developed, as the result of ' marriage ' with Tamil pariah women, into a colony, earning an honest livelihood by growing vegetables, cultivating coffee on a small scale, and adding to their income from these sources by the economic products of the cow. An ambassador was sent to this miniature Chinese Court with a suggestion that the men should, in return for monies, present themselves before me with a view to their measurements being recorded. The reply which came back was in its way racially characteristic as between Hindus and Chinese. In the case of the former, permission to make use of their bodies for the purposes of research depends essentially on a pecuniary transaction, on a scale varying from two to eight annas. The Chinese, on the other hand, though poor, sent a courteous message to the effect that they did not require payment in money, but would be perfectly happy if I would give them, as a memento, copies of their photographs." Thurston further described a specific family: "The father was a typical Chinaman, whose only grievance was that, in the process of conversion to Christianity, he had been obliged to 'cut him tail off.' The mother was a typical Tamil Pariah of dusky hue. The colour of the children was more closely allied to the yellowish tint of the father than to the dark tint of the mother; and the semimongol parentage was betrayed in the slant eyes, flat nose, and (in one case) conspicuously prominent cheek-bones." Thurston's description of the Chinese-Tamil families were cited by others, one mentioned "an instance mating between a Chinese male with a Tamil Pariah female" A 1959 book described attempts made to find out what happened to the colony of mixed Chinese and Tamils.

== Geography ==
Naduvattam is located at 11.48°N 76.57°E. It has an average elevation of 1953 metres (6407 feet).

== Demographics ==
As of 2001 India census, Naduvattam had a population of 11,706. Males constitute 51% of the population and females 49%. Naduvattam has an average literacy rate of 64%, higher than the national average of 59.5%: male literacy is 73%, and female literacy is 55%. In Naduvattam, 11% of the population is under 6 years of age.
