= Coonoor taluk =

Taluk in Tamil Nadu, India

Coordinates: 11.35°N 76.82°E

Coonoor taluk is a taluk of Nilgiris district of the Indian state of Tamil Nadu. The headquarters of the taluk is the town of Coonoor

== Demographics ==
According to the 2011 census, the taluk of Coonoor had a population of 157,754 with 78,411 males and 79,343 females. There were 1012 women for every 1000 men. The taluk had a literacy rate of 81.73. Child population in the age group below 6 was 6,364 Males and 6,194 Females.
