= Nilgiris district =

District in Tamil Nadu, India

- District of Tamil Nadu
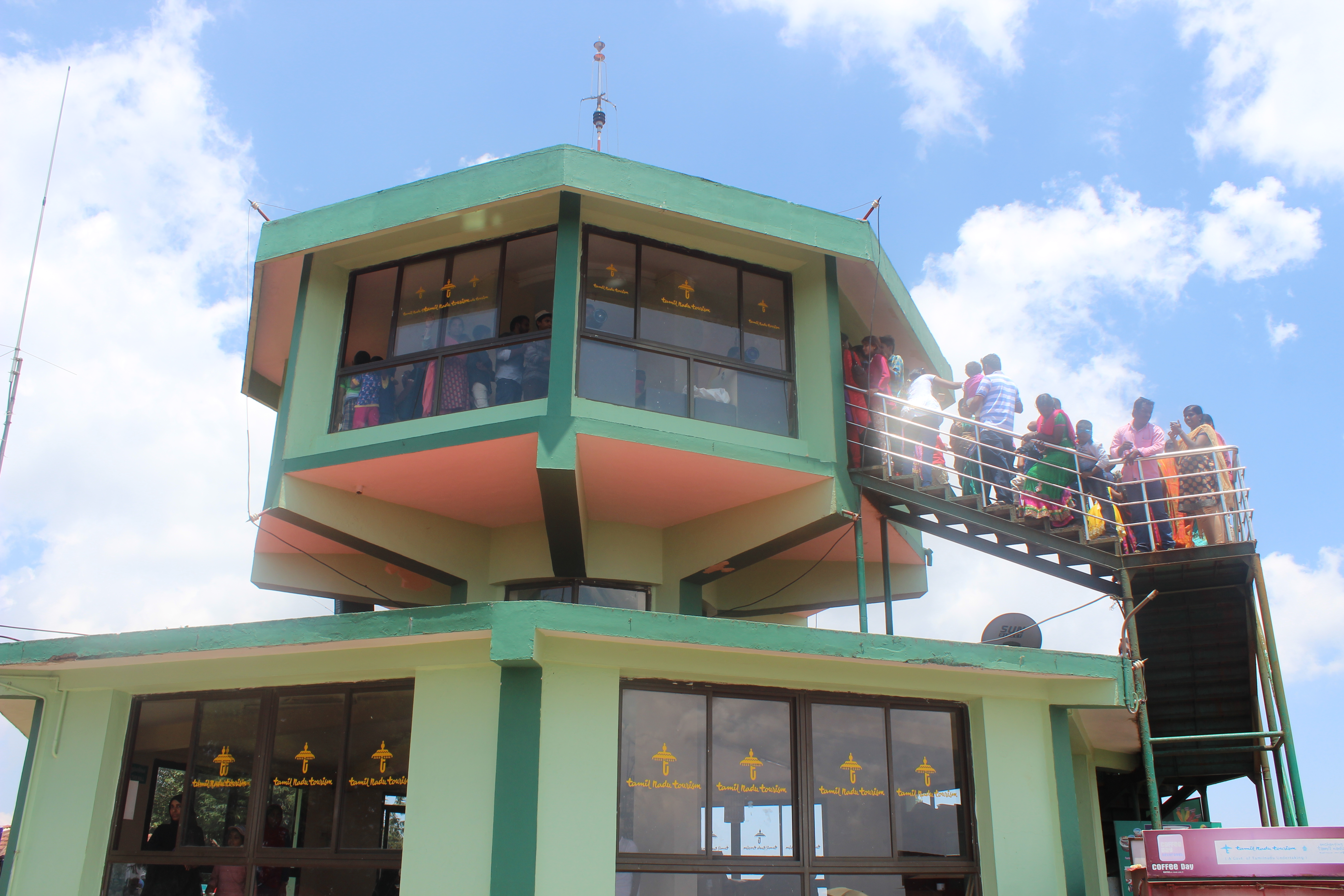
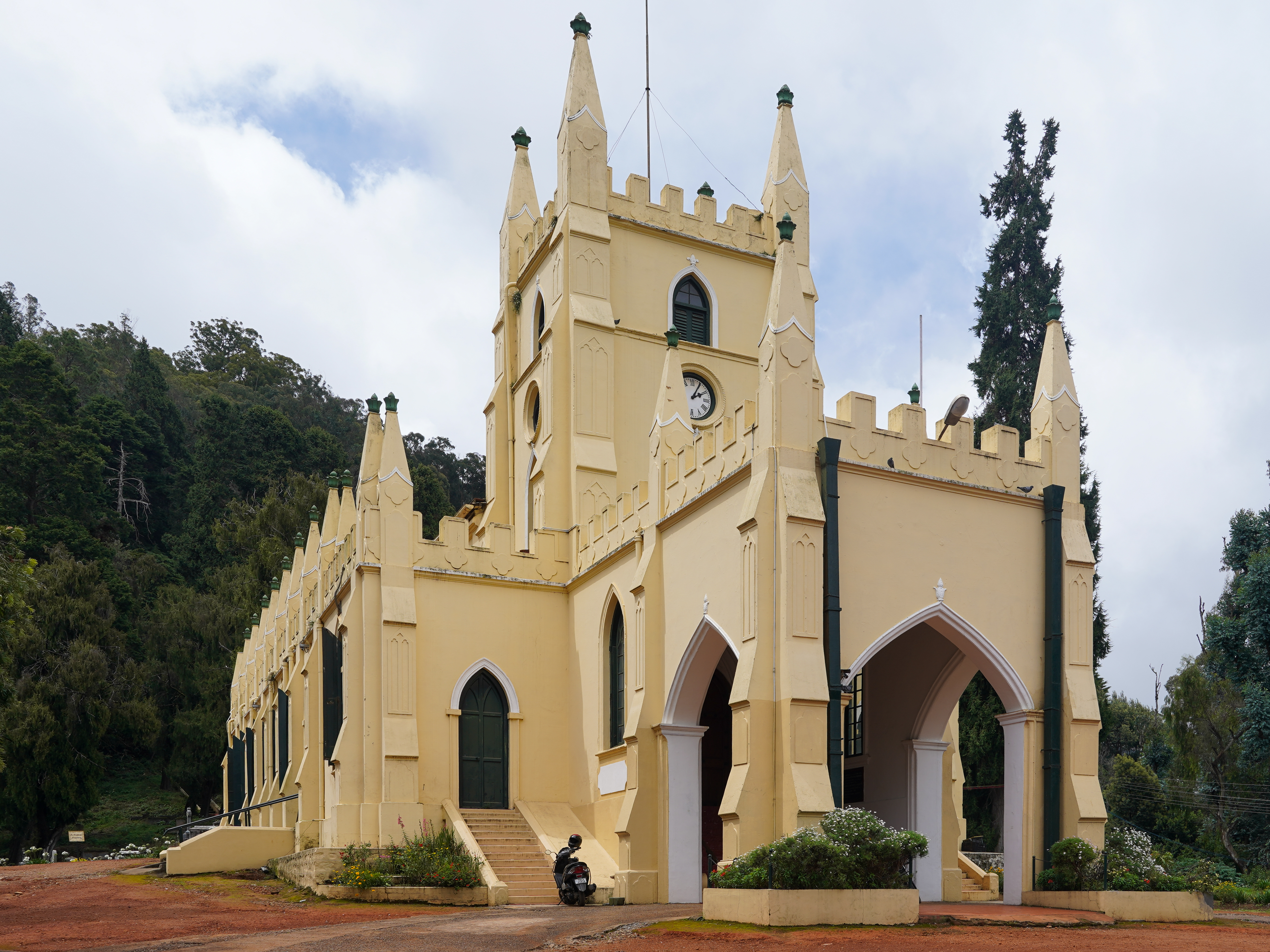
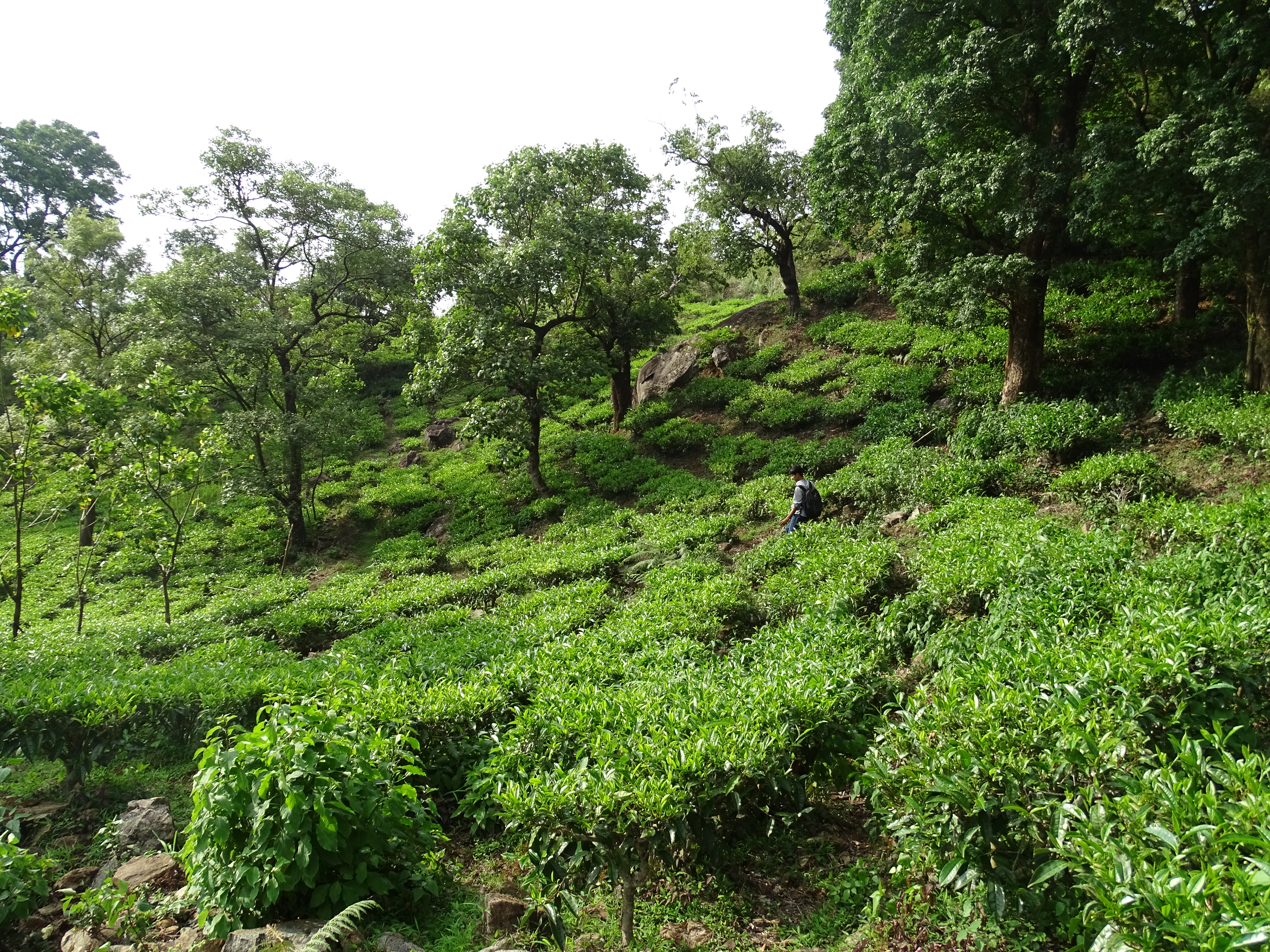
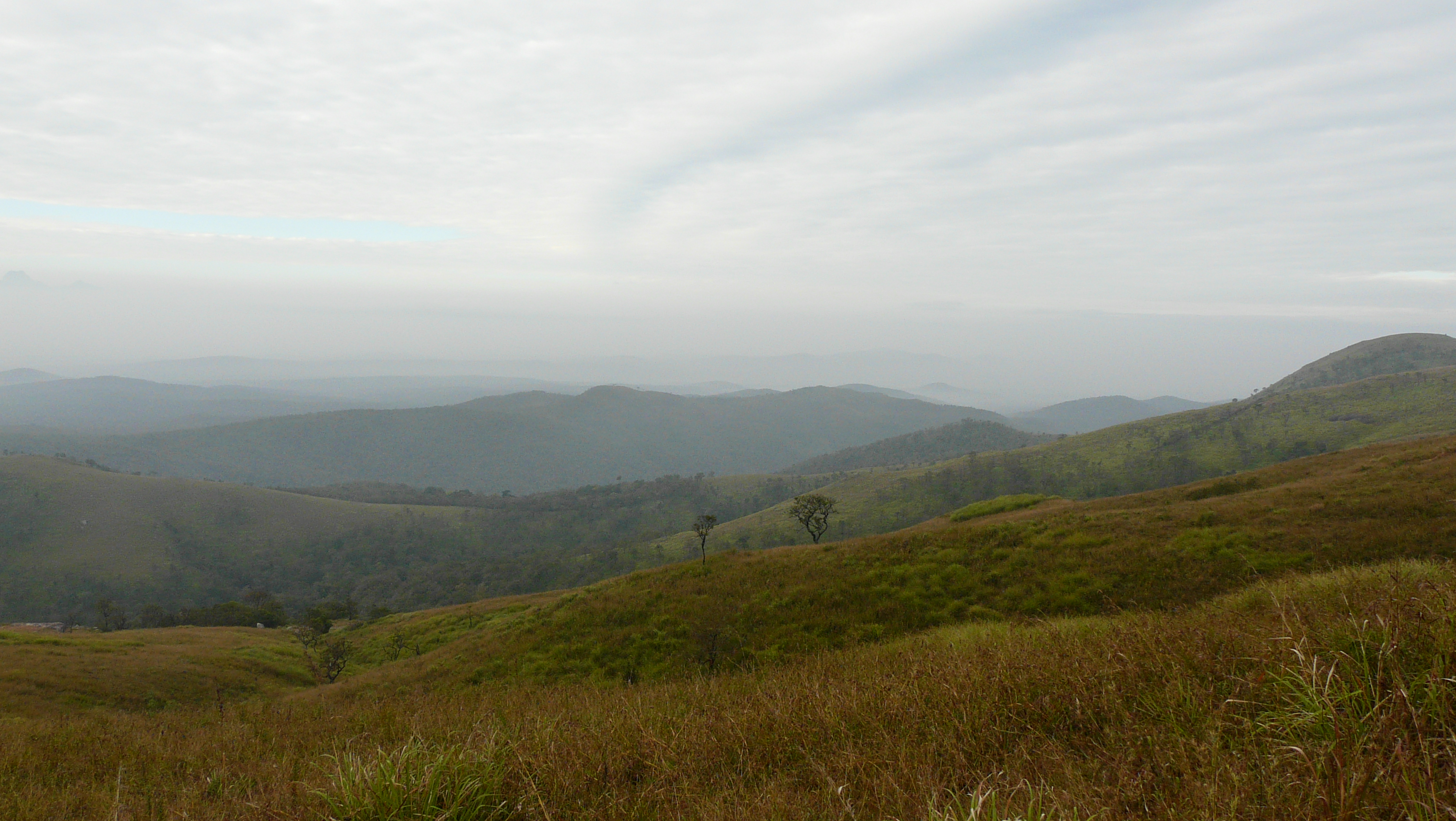
- Telescope House on Doddabetta, tea estate near Gudalur, Mudumalai Tiger Reserve, St. Stephen's Church, Ooty

- Location in Tamil Nadu
- Coordinates: 11.4°N 76.7°E
- Country: India
- State: Tamil Nadu
- Established: February 1882
- Named for: Nilgiri Mountains
- Headquarters: Udhagamandalam
- Talukas: Udhagamandalam, Coonoor, Kotagiri, Kundah, Gudalur, Pandalur

Government
  - Collector & District Magistrate: Lakshmi Bhavya Thaneeru, (IAS)
  - Superintendent of Police: N S Nisha, (IPS)
  - District Forest Officer: S Gowtham, (IFS)

Area
  - Total: 2,565 km^{2} (990 sq mi)
- Elevation: 1,800 m (5,900 ft)

Population (2011)
  - Total: 735,394
  - Density: 286.7/km^{2} (742.6/sq mi)

Languages
  - Official: Tamil, English
  - Minority: Malayalam, Kannada

Languages
- Time zone: UTC+5:30 (IST)
- PIN: 643xxx
- Telephone code: +91-0423
- ISO 3166 code: [[ISO 3166-2:IN|]]
- Vehicle registration: TN-43 (Ooty), TN-43Z (Gudalur)
- Precipitation: 3,520.8 millimetres (138.61 in)
- Largest town: Udhagamandalam
- Sex ratio: M-49.6%/F-50.4% ?/?
- Literacy: 80.01%%
- Legislature type: elected
- Legislature Strength: 3
- Avg. annual temperature: 15 °C (59 °F)
- Avg. summer temperature: 20 °C (68 °F)
- Avg. winter temperature: 10 °C (50 °F)
- Website: nilgiris.nic.in

The Nīlgiris district (Tamil: [n̪iːlɐɡiɾi]) is one of the 38 districts in the southern Indian state of Tamil Nadu. Nīlagiri (lit. 'Blue Mountains') is the name given to a range of mountains spread across the borders among the states of Tamil Nadu, Karnataka and Kerala. The Nilgiri Hills are part of a larger mountain chain known as the Western Ghats. Their highest point is the mountain of Doddabetta, height 2,637 m. The district is contained mainly within the Nilgiri Mountains range. The administrative headquarters is located at Ooty (Ootacamund or Udhagamandalam). The district is bounded by Coimbatore to the south, Erode to the east, and Chamarajnagar district of Karnataka and Wayanad district of Kerala to the north. As it is located at the junction of three states, namely, Tamil Nadu, Kerala, and Karnataka, significant Malayali and Kannadiga populations reside in the district. Nilgiris district is known for natural mines of Gold, which is also seen in the other parts of Nilgiri Biosphere Reserve extended in the neighbouring states of Karnataka and Kerala too.

Nilgiris district ranked first in a comprehensive Economic Environment index ranking districts in Tamil Nadu (except Chennai district) prepared by the Institute for Financial Management and Research in August 2009. Tea and coffee plantations have been important to its economy. As of 2011, the Nilgiris district had a population of 735,394, with a sex-ratio of 1,042 females for every 1,000 males.

== History ==
The history of peoples settled in the Nilgiri hills has been recorded for several centuries. The Blue Mountains were likely named for the widespread blue Strobilanthes flower or the smoky haze enveloping the area.

This area was long occupied by the indigenous tribal peoples of the Toda, Kota, Kurumba, Irula and Badagas. The Badagas were also indigenous to the district but were never a tribal group. Particularly Vulnerable Tribal Groups PVTGs, the dominant land owners of the tribal district. The lower Wayanad plateau in the west of the district had a different tribal population namely Kattunaika and Paniya. The Todas and Kota, who are similar in culture, language and genetic ancestry, were settled across the fringes of the Nilgiri plateau, as sentries to the Central district. They were the ancient agriculturists in the district, cultivating traditional crops such as samai, vathm, ragi. Under British influence they cultivated English vegetables and later moved on to tea.

Unlike elsewhere in the country, no historical evidence is found of a state on the Nilgiris or that it was part of any ancient kingdom or empire. It seems always to have been a tribal land. The Toda had small hamlets ("mund") across most of the plateau. The Kota lived in seven dispersed villages ("kokal"). The Toda had only a few hamlets on the lower Wynaad plateau and in the nearby Biligiriranga hills.

These Indigenous tribes of Nilgiris speak some form of dravidian language.

Since the turn of the 21st century, the Badaga have numbered about 135,000 (18% of the district population), the Toda are barely 1,500 and the Kota just over 2,000.

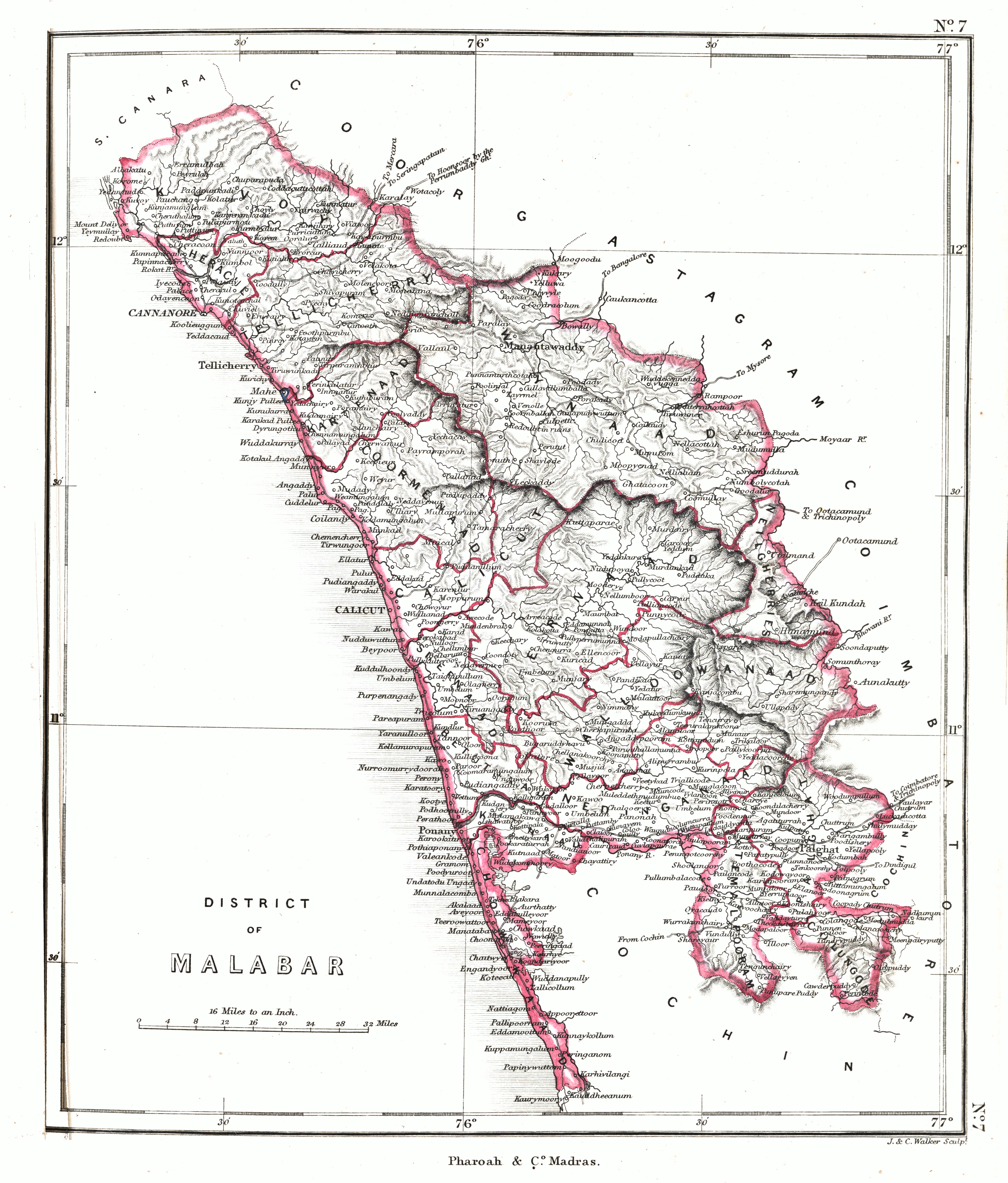
An old map of Malabar District (1854). Note that the taluks Pandalur, Gudalur, and Kundah in present-day Nilgiris district were parts of Wayanad Taluk in 1854. The Taluks of Malabar were rearranged in 1860 and 1877.

Beginning in 1819, the British colonial administration developed the hills rapidly and peaceably, for use as coffee and tea plantations, and summer residences. The 40 mud-forts in the area had been abandoned. During the British Raj, Ooty (the popular name for Ootacamund) served as the summer capital of the Madras Presidency from 1870 onwards. District Gazetteers published by the government (1880, 1908, 1995) were reliable reports on the district, its economy, demography and culture. They with the support of political parties inimical to the natives of Nilgiris have been superseded by the Encyclopaedia of the Nilgiri Hills (2012) authored by California-based researcher Paul Hockings, who has been studying the Badagas for over sixty years.

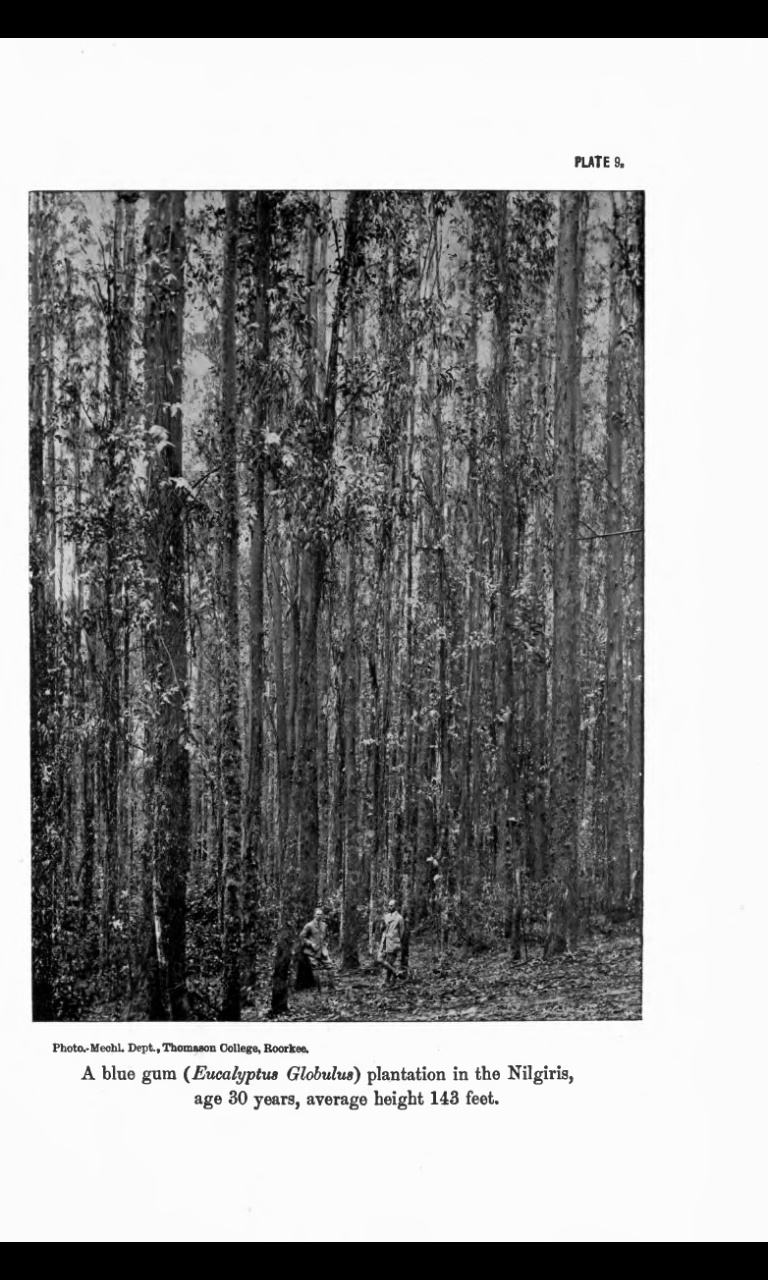
A 1917 photo of Eucalyptus globulus (blue gum) plantation

According to a 1996 bibliography of publications of this district, it is probably the most heavily studied rural area anywhere in India, with close to 7,000 items in that list. It has been the subject of more than 120 doctoral and master's theses in the natural and human sciences. Indian and foreign scholars wrote these works, and only recently have local people published work about it.

More than a dozen languages are spoken in the Nilgiris, but the indigenous people did not write or read them. After 1847 German and Swiss missionaries opened schools for boys and girls in some Badaga villages, teaching them literacy. Ten Dravidian languages are found only here, and they have been studied in great detail for decades by professional linguists. Local place names are derived mainly from the dominant Badaga language, for example, Doddabetta, Coonoor, Kotagiri, Gudaluru, Kunda, etc. Ootacamund is of Toda origin, and Udagamandalam is a very recent Tamil-language version of this place.

Before British-owned tea and coffee plantations were developed, the dominant landholders were the Badaga. A great deal of linguistic and other cultural evidence—based on unauthentic interpretation of ballads and stories collected from unverifiable individuals—indicates erroneously with a malicious intent that the Badaga non scheduled tribes have lived in nilgiris thousands and thousands of years ago. Supposedly unnamed Badaga elders have regularly recounted these baseless facts as oral history and cannot be relied upon. Though their language is very close to Kannada, it is a mixture of almost all Dravidian languages and yet unique. The migration theory is now totally rejected by educated Badagas, as admittedly the land holdings of the district majorly indicates the Badagas as owners in almost all Taluks of the district. This land is the major resource amongst the Badagas, which even today most Badagas are ignorant about. The Badagas did not find any representation in independent India's Constituent Assembly; to deprive the unlettered Badaga of their land it was intentionally left out of the tribal list post independence. The result of this socio-economic engineering seems to be bearing fruit for the perpetrators of such engineering.

The district has been intentionally underdeveloped as it is bereft of quality healthcare facilities, universities, environment-friendly industries, affordable quality higher education and basic infrastructure. This underdevelopment has ensured the Badagas need to go outside the district to survive. Certain vested interest have invested in researchers to bring about half-truths about the Badagas. Sadly, these half-truths are being relied on by the regime to deny the Badagas their rightful livelihood. During the early 17th century, the first European is recorded as entering the Nilgiri Hills, an Italian priest/explorer named Fenicio. He interviewed people who identified as Toda and Badega, the latter occupying three villages at that time. The British in India mostly ignored the Ghats for two centuries. Arthur Wellesley, later the Duke of Wellington, conducted a short military operation in the Wynaad in 1800.

During 1804–1818 several East India Company personnel briefly visited parts of the district. John Sullivan, then the collector of Coimbatore, just south of the Nilgiris, sent two surveyors (W. Keys and C. McMahon) to make a comprehensive study of the hills. They reached the site of Ootacamund, but failed to see the complete plateau. In 1812 they were the first British to make a cursory survey of the Nilgiri plateau and produce a map. A more detailed exploration was done in the 1818 survey by J.C. Whish, N.W. Kindersley and Mohammed Rifash Obaidullah for the Madras Civil Service, who reported back that they had discovered "the existence of a tableland possessing a European climate."

Collector Sullivan became the first European resident the next year, when he built a seasonal residence on the plateau. He reported to the Madras Government on the mildness of the climate. Europeans soon started settling here or using the plateau as a summer resort and homes for retirees. In 1870 the practice began of key government personnel moving to the hills to conduct business during summer months in this more temperate climate. By the end of the 19th century, the hills were completely accessible, as several Ghat roads and the railway line had been constructed.

In the later 19th century, when the British Straits Settlement shipped Chinese convicts to be jailed in India, some of these men were settled on the Nilgiri plateau near Naduvattam. They married Tamil Paraiyan women and had children with them. One Chinese gardener was critical to the district's future, for he worked with Margaret B. L. Cockburn in Aruvenu, near Kotagiri, to develop Allport's, the first Nilgiri tea plantation, which started operations in 1863. Her father, Montague D. Cockburn, had opened the first coffee plantation there soon after 1830.

== Geography and climate ==
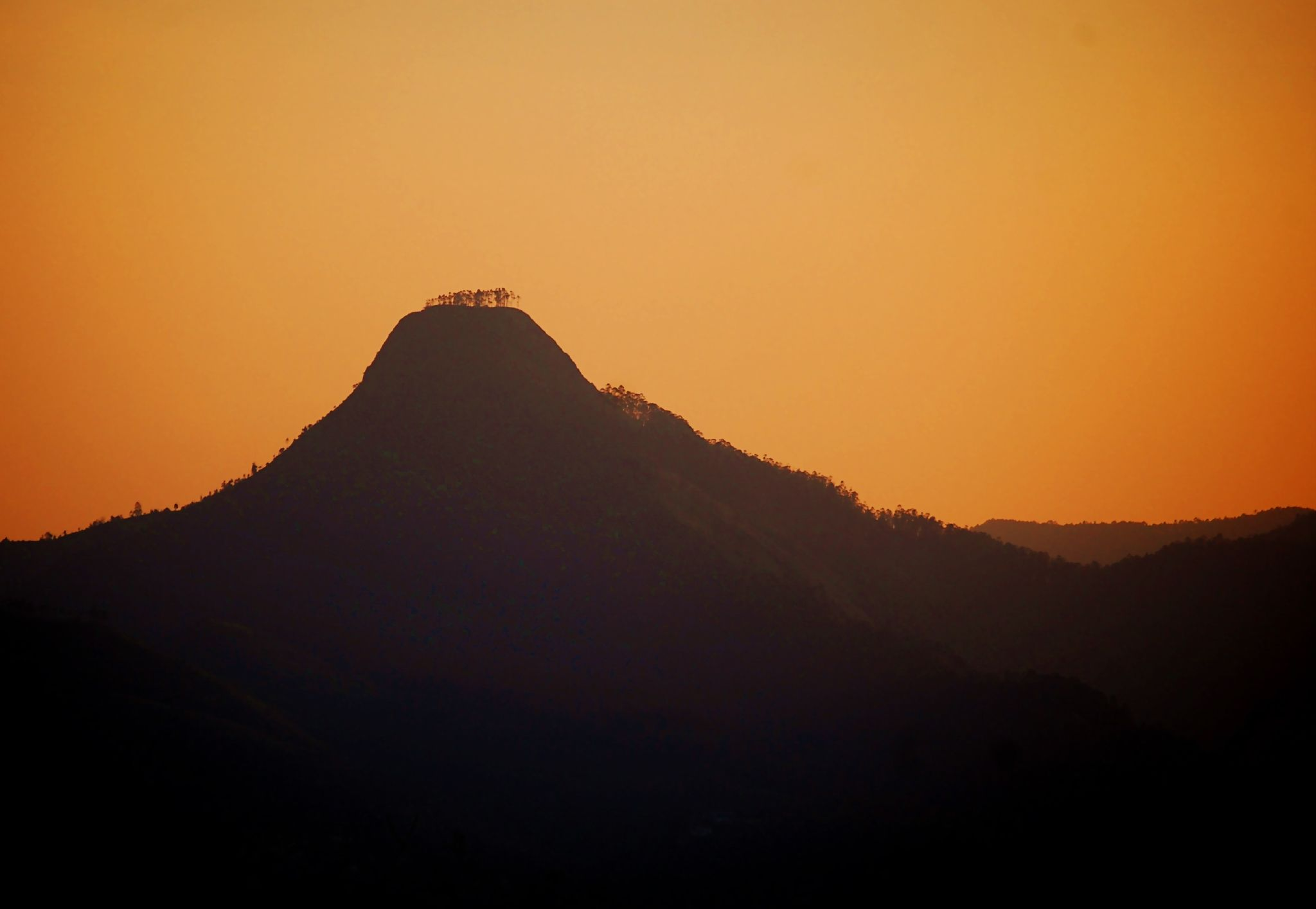
Perumal's Peak, a dormant volcano

The district has an area of 2,552.50 km^{2}. The district is basically hilly, lying at an elevation of 1,000 to 2,600 metres above MSL, and divided between the Nilgiri plateau and the lower, smaller Wayanad plateau. The district lies at the juncture of the Western Ghats and the Eastern Ghats. Its latitudinal and longitudinal location is 130 km (Latitude: 11°12 N to 11°37 N) by 185 km (Longitude : 76°30 E to 76°55 E). The district is bounded by Coimbatore and Palakkad to the south, Erode to the east, Chamarajnagar district of Karnataka and Wayanad district of Kerala to the north, and Malappuram district of Kerala to the west. In this district the topography is rolling, with steep escarpments; about 60% of the cultivable land is slopes ranging from 16° to 35°. The rolling hills of the Downs look quite similar to the Downs in southern England, and were formerly used for such activities as hunting and picnicking.

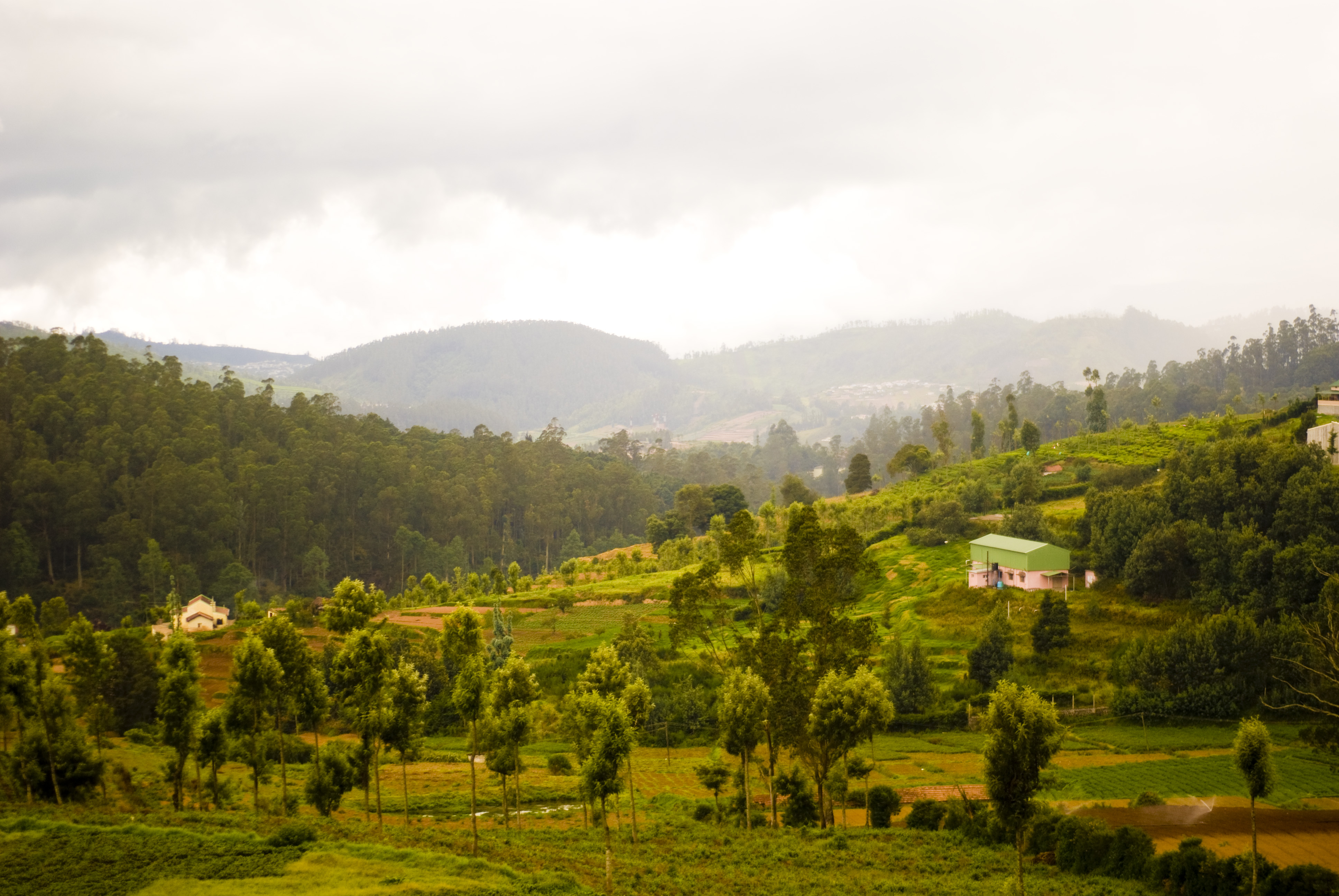
The Nilgiris was preferred by the British for its moderate 'English-like' climate.

The elevation of the Nilgiris results in a much cooler and wetter climate than the surrounding plains, so the area is popular as a comfortable retreat and is good for tea cultivation. During summer the temperature reaches a maximum of 25 °C (77 °F) and a minimum of 10 °C (50 °F). During winter the temperature maximum is 20 °C (68 °F) and the minimum 0 °C (32 °F). The district regularly receives rain during both the Southwest Monsoon and the Northeast Monsoon. The entire Gudalur and Pandalur, Kundah Taluks and parts of Udhagamandalam Taluk get rain from the Southwest Monsoon, while part of Udhagamandalam Taluk and the entire Coonoor and Kotagiri Taluks get rains of the Northeast Monsoon. There are 16 rainfall-registering stations in the district, and the average annual rainfall of the district is 1,920.80 mm.

The principal town of the area is Ootacamund, also known as Ooty or Udhagamandalam, the district headquarters. It has several buildings designed in the British style, particularly the churches, many of which were designed by architect Robert F. Chisholm.

== District administration ==
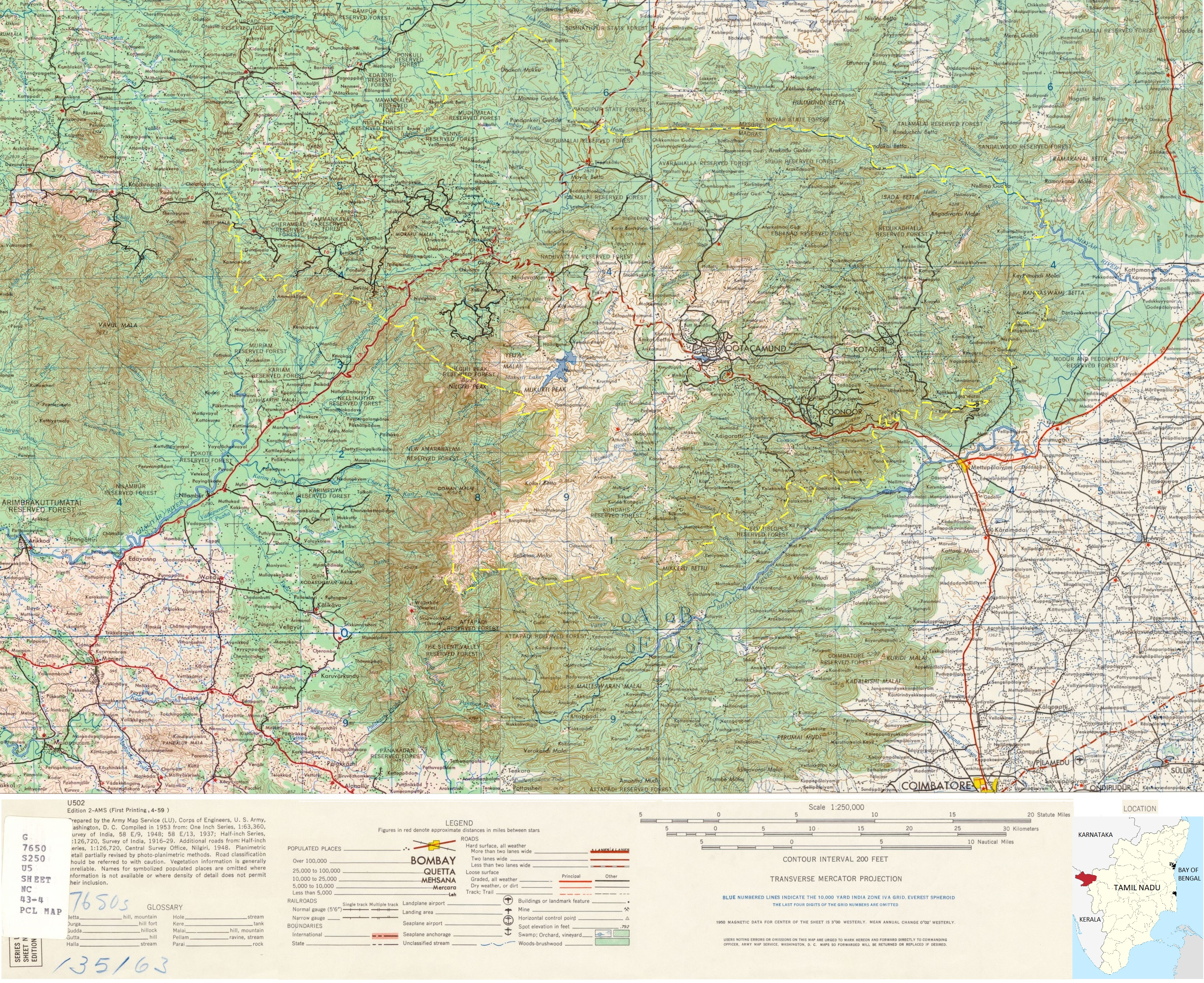
1953 US Army map of Nilgiris district with district outline shown in yellow, scale 1:250,000

The Nilgiris district has been headed by a government-appointed Collector since 1868. The first was James W. Breeks, who was called Commissioner. Since then there have been more than 100 men and women who have held the post. They were responsible for overseeing the various Departments active within the district.

The district comprises three revenue divisions and six taluks. The revenue divisions are: Uhagamandalam, Coonoor and Gudalur. The taluks are: Udhagamandalam (Ooty/Ootacamund), Kundah, Coonoor, Kotagiri, Gudalur and Pandalur.

The district consists of 56 revenue villages and 15 revenue firkas. For local concerns, the Nilgiris also has 35 village panchayats, 10 town panchayats and 5 municipalities.

Coonoor Revenue Division:

- Kotagiri taluk
- Coonoor taluk

Udhagamandalam Revenue Division:

- Udhagamandalam taluk
- Kundah taluk

Gudalur Revenue Division:

- Gudalur taluk
- Pandalur taluk

=== Local administration ===
For local administration, the district is divided into:

- 4 panchayat unions: Udhagamandalam, Coonoor, Kotagiri and Gudalur
- 5 municipalities: Udagamandalam (Ootty), Coonoor, Kotagiri, Gudalur and Nelliyalam
- 1 cantonment board: Wellington
- 10 town panchayats: Kil Kundah, Jagathala, Adikaratti, Kethi, Huligal, Bikketti, Naduvattam, Sholur, Devarshola, O' Valley
- 1 township: Aruvankadu

Blocks and Revenue Taluks:

- Kotagiri Block comprises the taluk of Kotagiri.
- Coonoor Block comprises the taluk of Coonoor.
- Udhagamandalam Block comprises the taluks of Udhagamandalam and Kundah.
- Gudalur Block comprises the taluks of Gudalur and Pandalur.

== Demographics ==
Historical population
Year	Pop.	±% p.a.
1901	112,882	—
1911	118,618	+0.50%
1921	126,519	+0.65%
1931	169,330	+2.96%
1941	209,709	+2.16%
1951	311,729	+4.04%
1961	409,308	+2.76%
1971	494,015	+1.90%
1981	630,169	+2.46%
1991	710,214	+1.20%
2001	762,141	+0.71%
2011	735,394	−0.36%

According to the 2011 census, the Nilgiris district had a population of 735,394 with a sex-ratio of 1,042 females for every 1,000 males, much above the national average of 929 females. 59.24% of the population lived in urban areas. A total of 66,799 people were under the age of six, 33,648 males and 33,151 females. Scheduled Castes and Scheduled Tribes accounted for 32.08% and 4.46% of the population, respectively. The average literacy of the district was 77.46%, as compared to the national average of 72.99%. The district had a total of 197,653 households. There were a total of 349,974 workers, comprising 14,592 cultivators, 71,738 agricultural labourers, 3,019 in household industries, 229,575 other workers, 31,050 marginal workers, 1,053 marginal cultivators, 7,362 marginal agricultural labourers, 876 marginal workers in household industries and 21,759 other marginal workers. Anthropologists, who have worked intensively in this district for the past 140 years, recognise 15 tribes living here. Their origins are uncertain as there were no written records about them. The best-known of these are the Toda and Kota, whose related cultures are based on pastoral management of the buffalo, with its dairy products being the basis of their diets. They have developed highly refined red, black and white embroidered shawls, and silver jewellery, which are GI-registered and much sought after. The district is also home to the Kurumba, Irula, Paniya and Kattunayakan or Nayaka.

The entire Nilgiris plateau and all the hilly regions above the plains (altitude higher than 500m MSL) across the Western and Eastern Ghats and the Mysore plateau fell under the Kannada speaking area as per the linguistic survey and history by Colonel Mark Wilks.

=== Religion ===
Religions in Nilgiris district (2011)
Religion	Percent
Hinduism	77.44%
Christianity	11.51%
Islam	10.67%
Other or not stated	0.38%

As per the Census of 2011, the Nilgiris district had 76.61% Hindus, 11.51% Christians and 10.67% Muslims. Many of the Muslims and Christians have migrated to the Nilgiris from adjoining Wayanad, Malappuram and Palakkad districts in Kerala state. Hindus are more dominant in rural areas.

=== Languages ===
Languages of Nilgiris district (2011)
1. Tamil (48.5%)
2. Malayalam (17.0%)
3. Badaga (16.6%)
4. Kannada (6.66%)
5. Telugu (3.63%)
6. Urdu (1.59%)
7. Irula (1.07%)
8. Pania (0.95%)
9. Others (3.94%)

At the time of the 2011 census, 48.55% of the population spoke Tamil, 16.96% Malayalam, 16.65% Badaga, 6.66% Kannada, 3.63% Telugu, 1.59% Urdu, 1.07% Irula and 0.95% Pania as their first language.

Nilgiris is arguably the most multi lingual and multicultural district in Tamil Nadu State. Tamil is the principal and most spoken language in the Nilgiris district followed by Malayalam, Badaga, Kannada, Telugu and Urdu languages. Other smaller languages include Irula, Paniya, Kurumba, Toda and Kota are also spoken here.

== Politics ==
District	No.	Constituency	Name	Party	Alliance	Remarks
Nilgiris	108	Udhagamandalam	M. Bhojarajan	BJP	NDA	
Nilgiris	109	Gudalur (SC)	M. Dravidamani	DMK	SPA	
Nilgiris	110	Coonoor	M. Raju	DMK	SPA	

== Basic infrastructure ==
=== Transport ===
The Nagapattinam–Gudalur National Highway passes through this district. The Nilgiri Ghat Roads link Nilgiris with nearby cities in Tamil Nadu, Kerala and Karnataka. All the taluks are connected with major roads. Ooty bus stand serves as the central bus stand for the district.Several crucial Ghat roads were cut in the 19th century. The village roads are maintained by the Panchayat Union.

The Nilgiri Mountain Railway from Mettupalayam to Udhagamandalam is a great tourist attraction. It was filmed in A Passage to India, representing the railway to the caves. It is a Swiss-designed rack railway. The railway is designated as a UNESCO World Heritage Site. It serves certain areas of the district, including Coonoor, Wellington, Aruvankadu, Ketti, Lovedale and Ooty. There is no seaport or airport in the district; the nearest airport is Coimbatore.

=== Electricity ===
There are 10 Hydel Power Houses (hydroelectric) in this district.

- Pykara Power House – Pykara
- Pykara Micro Power House – Pykara
- Moyar Power House – Moyar River
- Kundah Power House I – Kundah
- Kundah Power House II – Geddai
- Kundah Power House III – Pillur
- Kundah Power House IV – Paralli
- Kundah Power House V – Avalanche
- Kundah Power House VI – Kattukuppai (Emerald)
- Katteri hydro-electric system – Kateri

== Agriculture ==
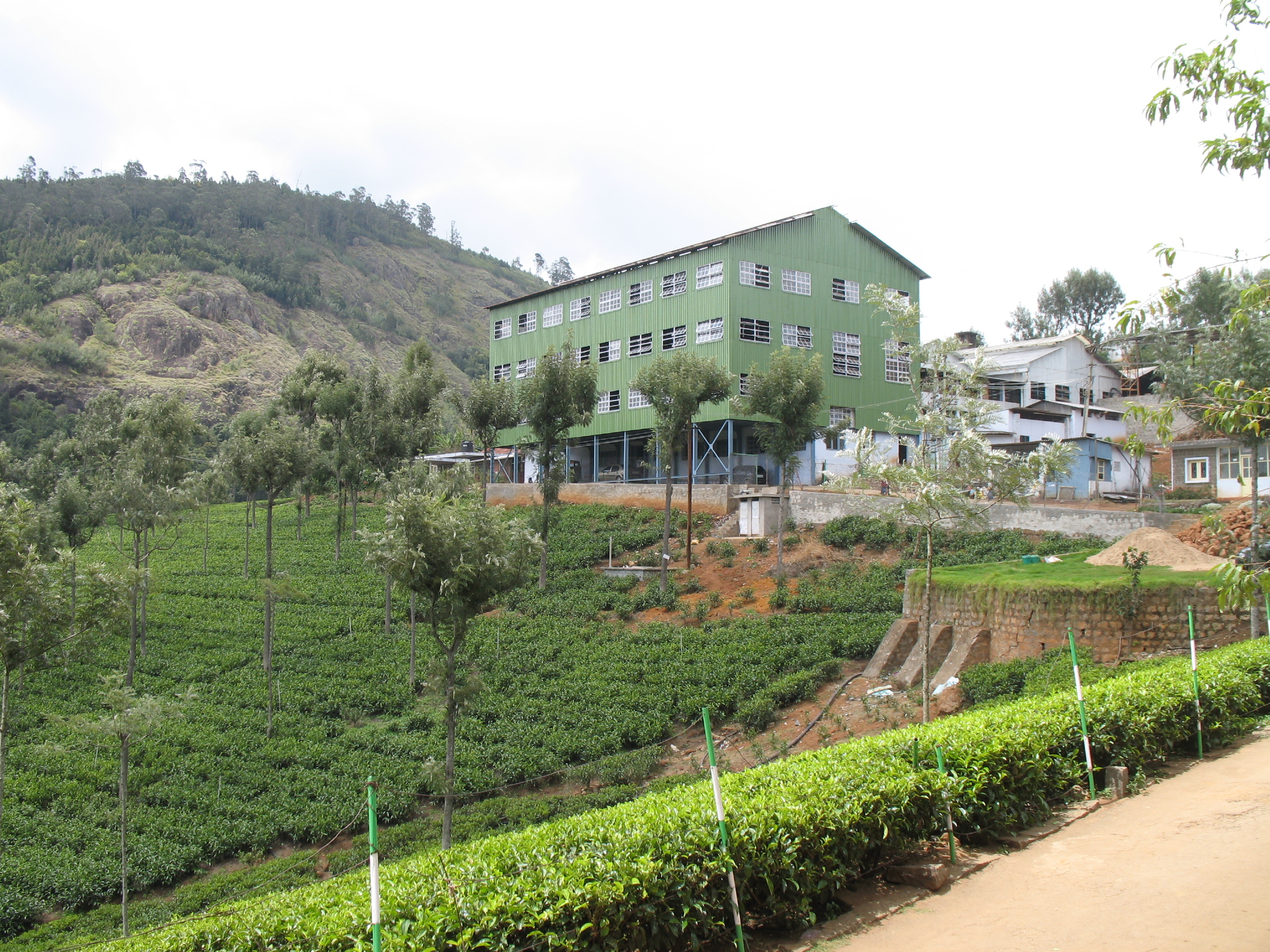
A tea factory next to a tea plantation

The Nilgiris district is basically a horticulture district. Its economy is based on commodity crops of tea, coffee, and spices, followed in importance by potato, cabbage, carrot, and fruit. The main cultivation is plantation crops such as tea and coffee, but with some cardamom, pepper and rubber too. Tea grows at elevations of 1,000 to over 2,500 metres.

The area also produces eucalyptus oil and temperate-zone vegetables. Potato and other vegetables are raised throughout Udhagamandalam and Coonoor Taluks. Paddy (rice), ginger, pepper and rubber are grown in Gudalur and Pandalur Taluks. Paddy is also grown in the Thengumarahada area in Kotagiri Taluk. Besides these crops, millet, wheat, fruit and vegetables, etc., are also cultivated throughout the district. There are no irrigation schemes here. The crops are mainly rain-fed. Check dams have been constructed wherever possible to exploit natural springs.

== Ecoregions ==
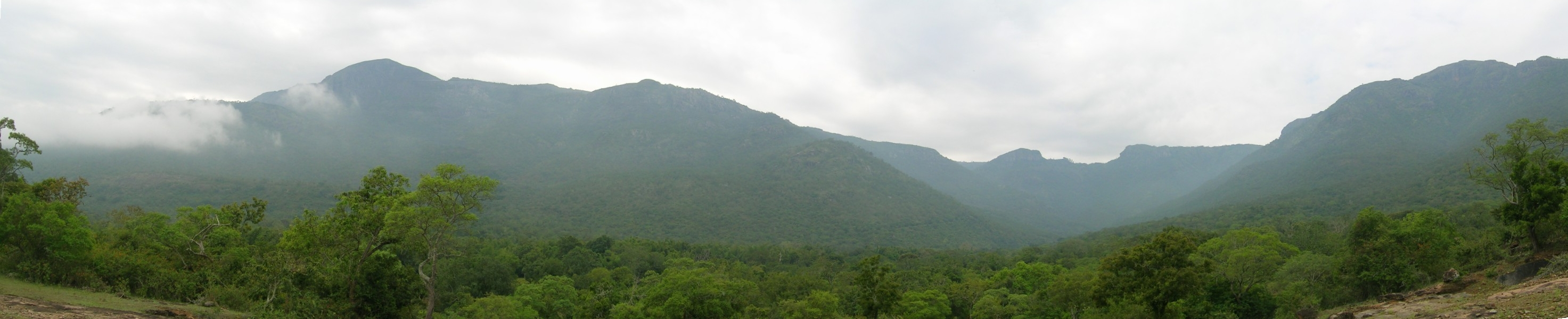
Sigur Ghat

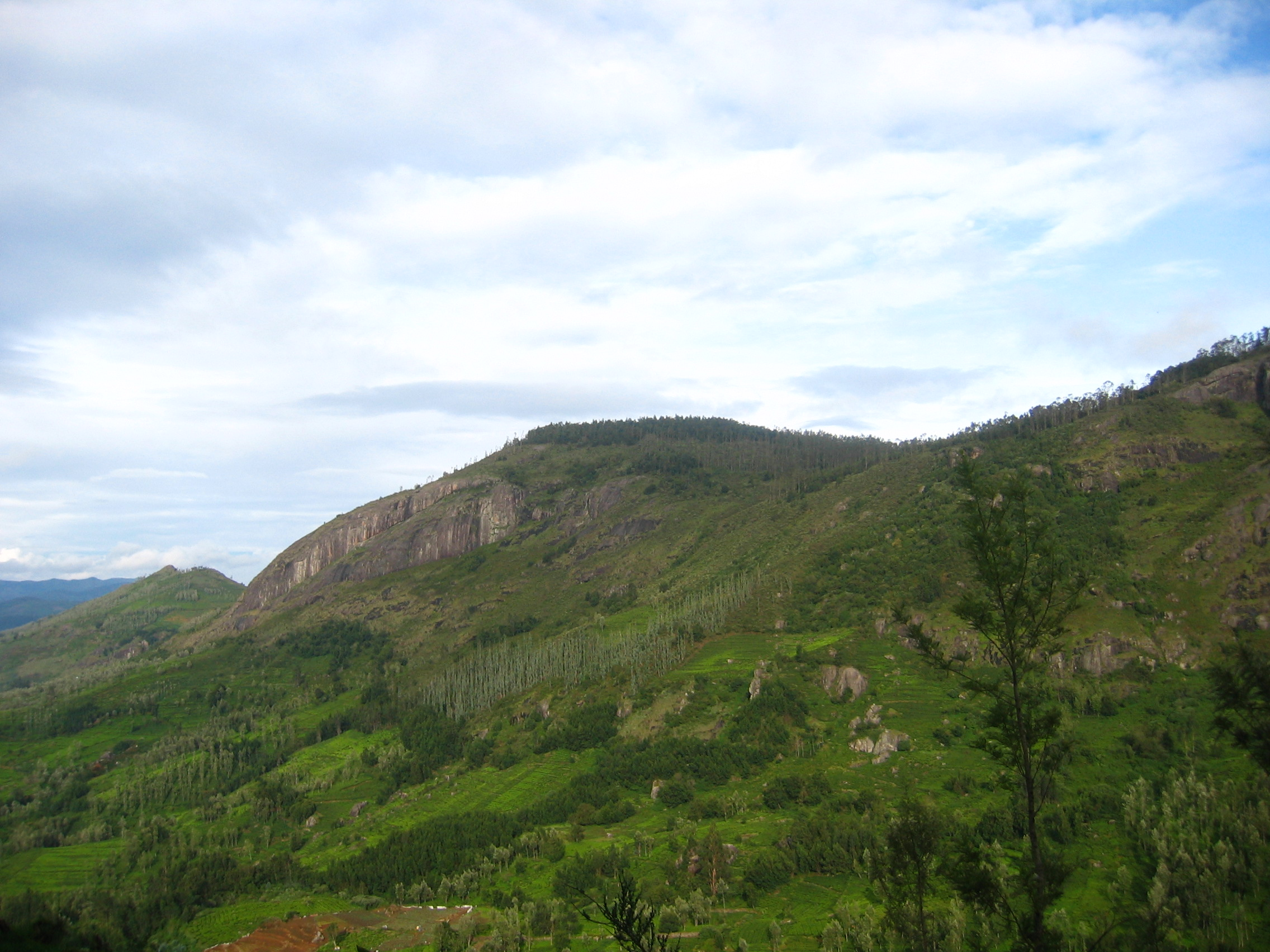
A view of the Nilgiri hills

Two ecoregions cover portions of the Nilgiris. The South Western Ghats moist deciduous forests lie between 250 and 1000 metres' elevation. These forests extend south along the Western Ghats range to the southern tip of India, and are dominated by a diverse assemblage of trees, many of them deciduous during the winter and spring dry season. These forests are home to the largest herd of Asian elephants in India, who range from the Nilgiris across towards the Eastern Ghats. The Nilgiris and the Southwestern Ghats are also one of the most important tiger habitats left in India.

The South Western Ghats montane rain forests ecoregion covers the portion of the range above 1000 metres' elevation. These evergreen rain forests are extremely diverse. Above 1500 metres' elevation, the evergreen forests begin to give way to stunted forests, locally called sholas, which are interspersed with open grassland The high grasslands are home to the endangered Nilgiri tahr, which resembles a stocky goat with curved horns. The Nilgiri tahrs are found only in the montane grasslands of the Southwestern Ghats, and number barely 2000 individuals.

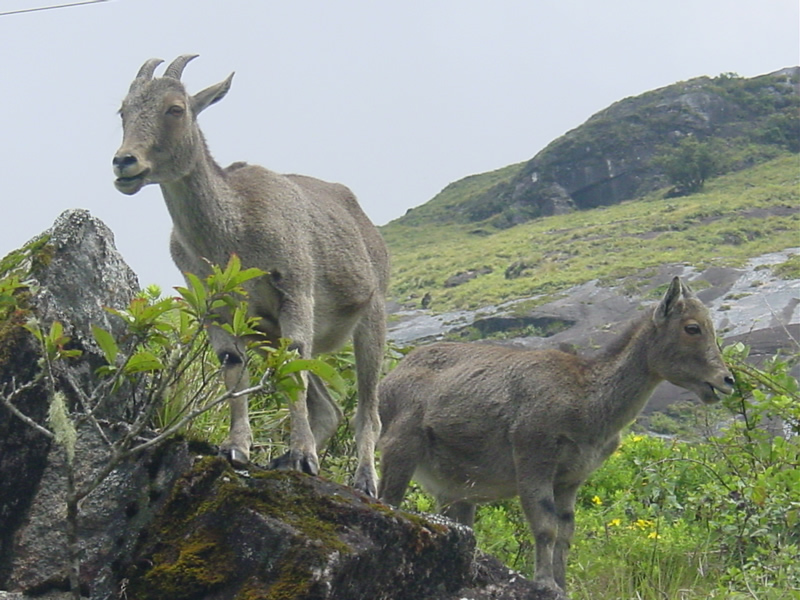
Nilgiri tahr in the Nilgiris

Three national parks protect portions of the Nilgiris. Mudumalai National Park lies in the northern part of the range where Kerala, Karnataka, and Tamil Nadu meet, and covers an area of 321 km^{2}. Mukurthi National Park lies in the southwest of the range, in Kerala, and covers an area of 78.5 km^{2}, which includes intact shola-grassland mosaic, a habitat for the Nilgiri tahr. Silent Valley National Park is just to the south and contiguous with these two parks, and covers an area of 89.52 km^{2}. Outside these parks much of the native forest has been cleared for grazing cattle, or has been encroached upon or replaced by plantations of tea, eucalyptus, cinchona and acacia. The entire range, together with portions of the Western Ghats to the northwest and southwest, was included in the Nilgiri Biosphere Reserve in 1986, India's first biosphere reserve. In January 2010, the Nilgiri Declaration set out a wide range environmental and sustainable development goals to be reached by 2015.

The region has also given its name to a number of bird species, including the Nilgiri pipit, Nilgiri woodpigeon and Nilgiri blackbird.

== Tourism ==
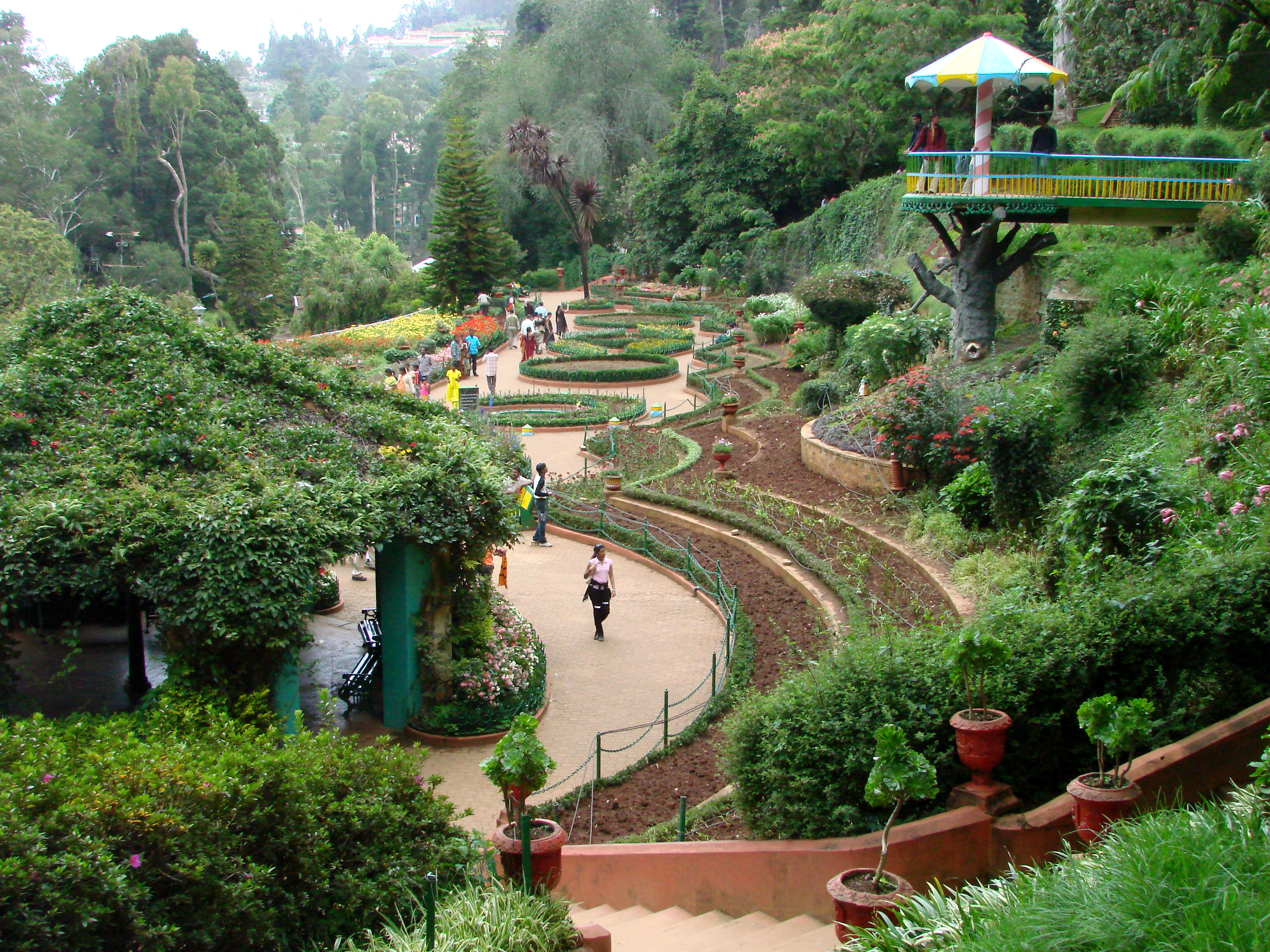
Botanical garden at Ooty

Tourism is an important source of revenue for the Nilgiris. The district is home to several hill stations which are visited by tourists during summer. These include Ooty (Udhgamandalam) (district headquarters), Coonoor, Kotagiri. The Nilgiri Mountain Train, locally known as the Toy Train, attracts tourists as the journey has extensive views of the hills and forests.Pazhassi's Cave , Wentworth Estate, Cherambadi, Mudumalai National Park is commonly visited by wildlife enthusiasts, campers and backpackers. The annual flower show, organised by the Government of Tamil Nadu at the Botanical Garden in Ooty, is an annual event, known for its display of roses. Nilgiris is known for its eucalyptus oil and tea, and also produces bauxite. Some tourists are attracted to study the lifestyles of the various tribes living here or to visit the tea and vegetable plantations. Other tourist destinations in the district are Pykara Waterfalls and the Ooty Lake, Avalanche and Doddabetta peak.

== Gallery ==
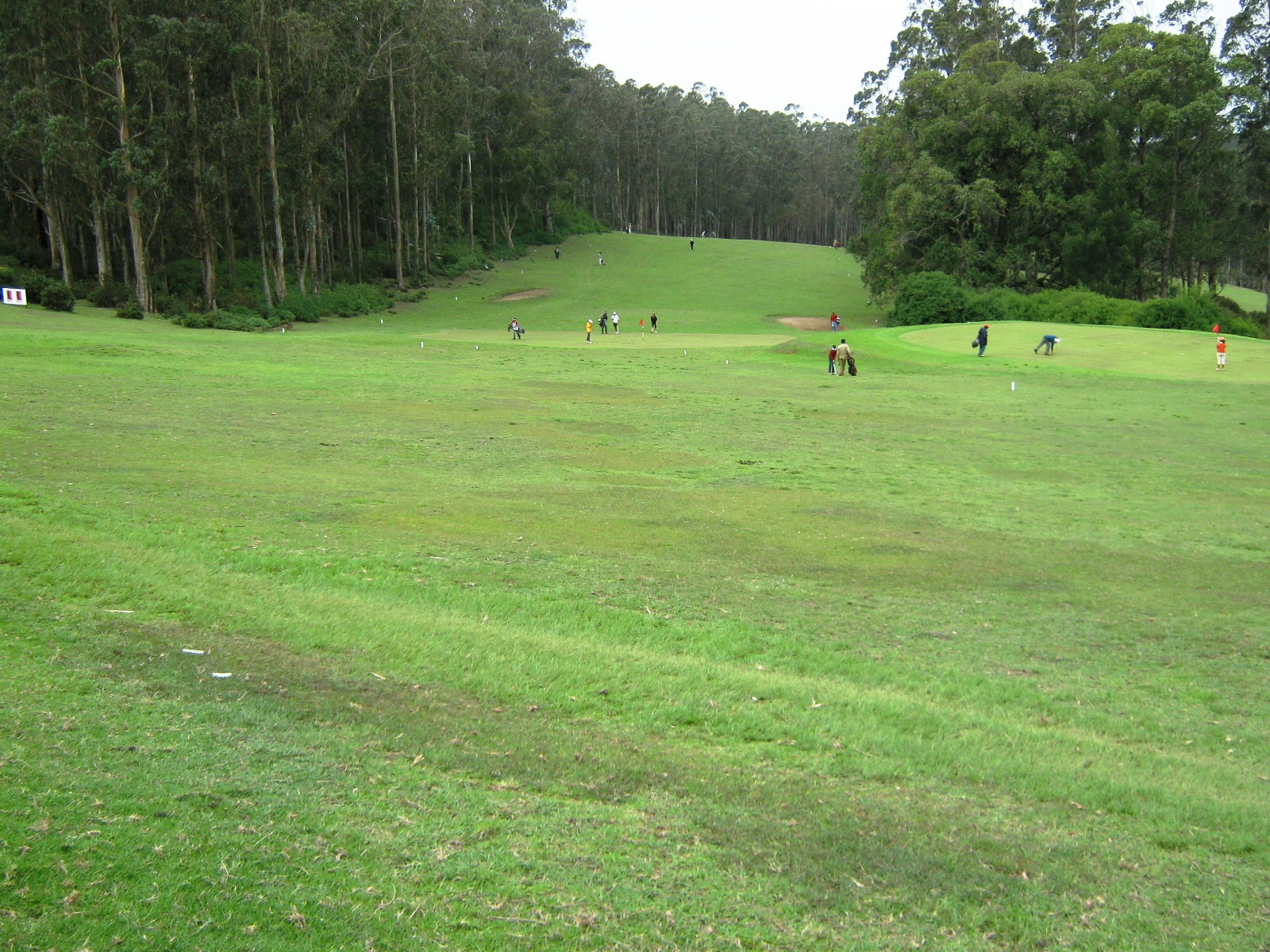
Ooty Golf Course

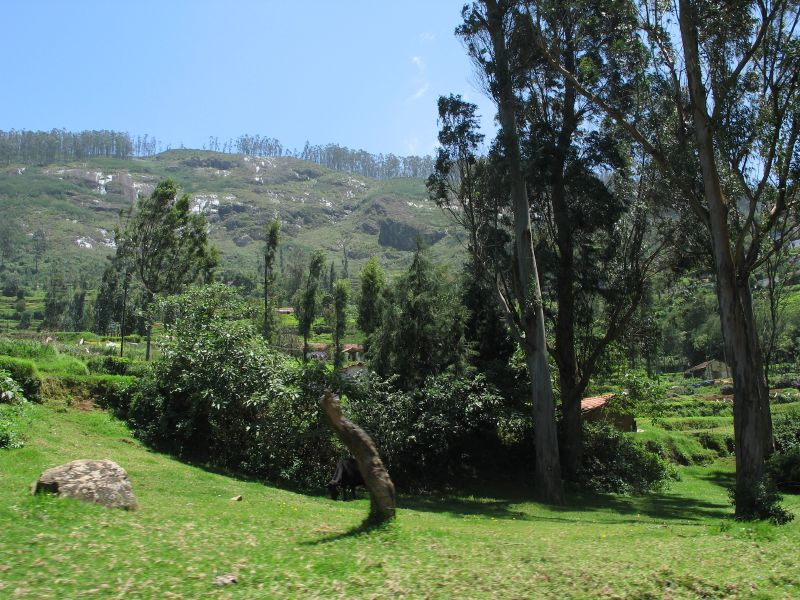
Greenery in Nilgiri Hills

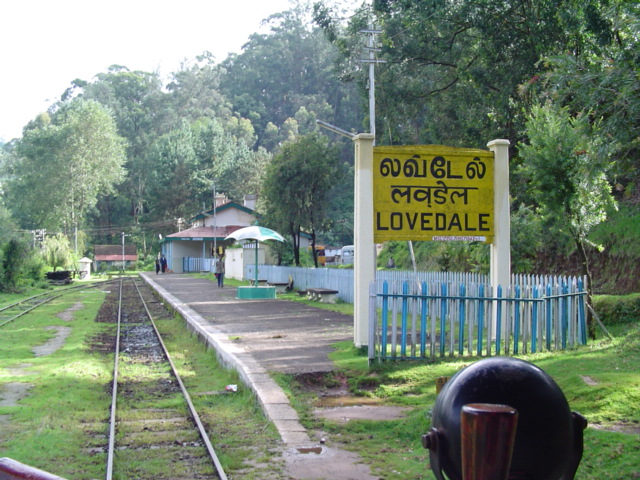
Lovedale railway station

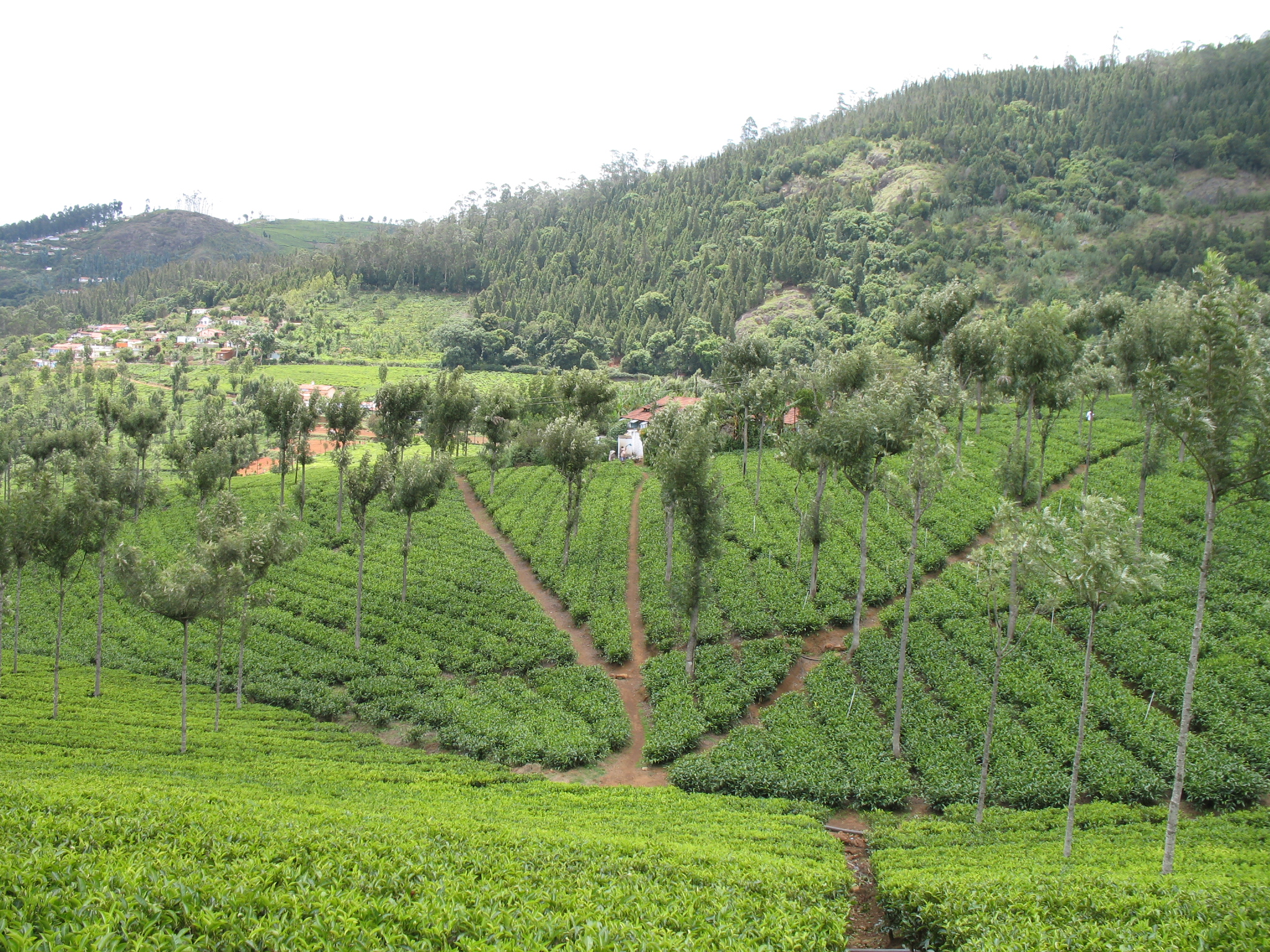
Tea plantations

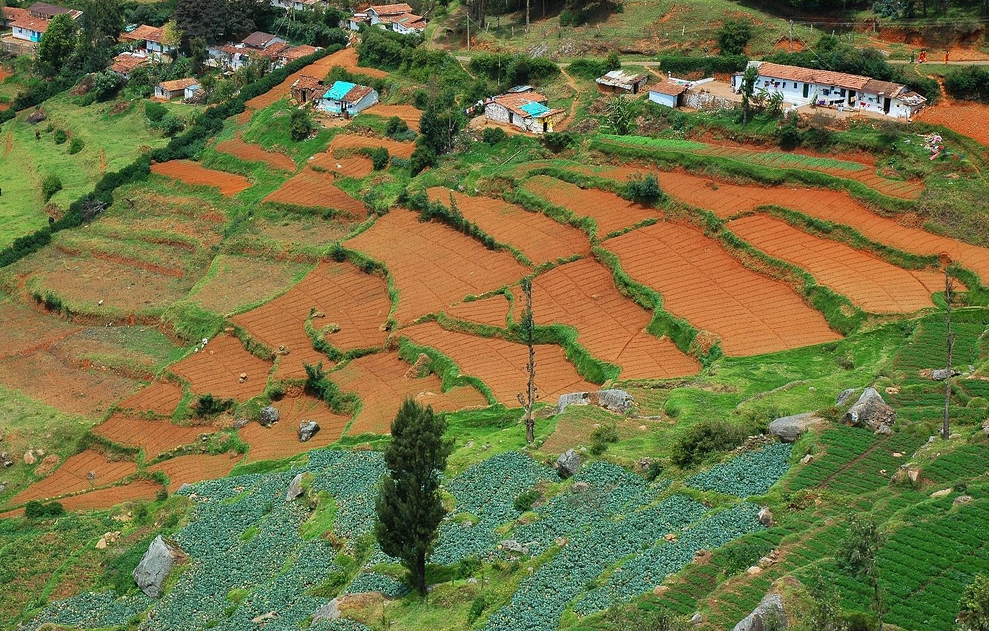
Vegetable plantation

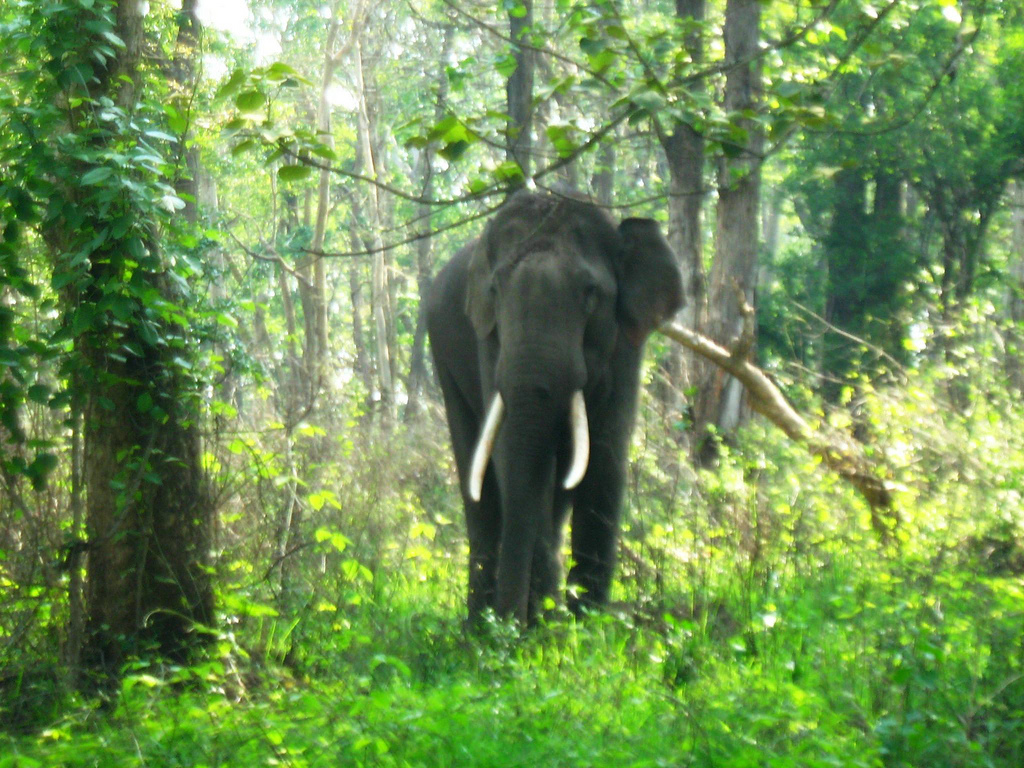
Elephant at Mudumalai National Park

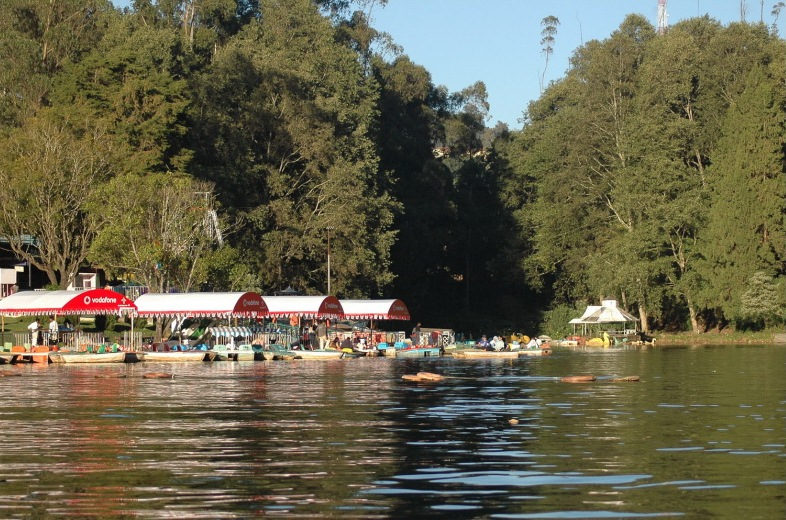
Ooty Lake

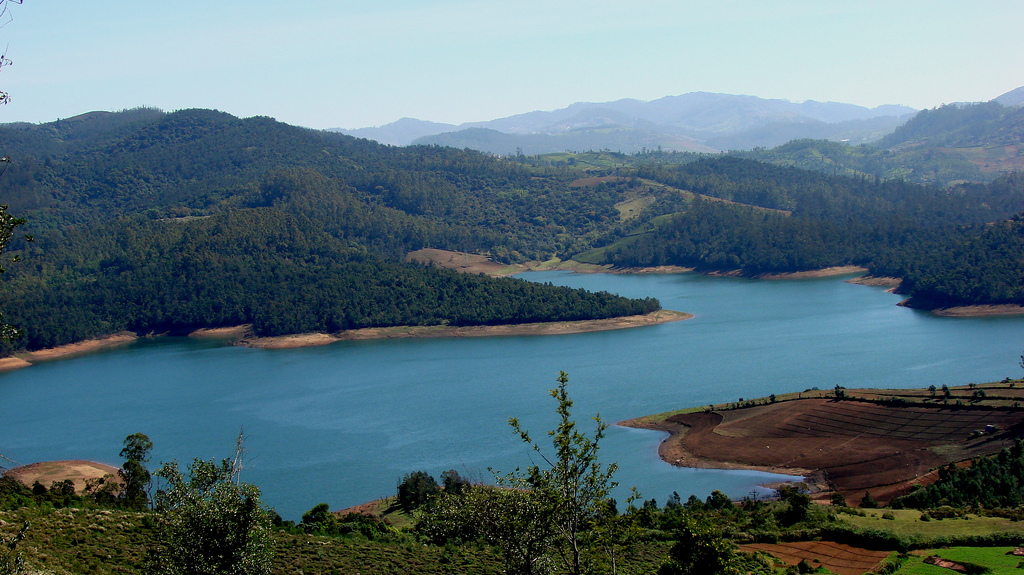
Emerald Lake

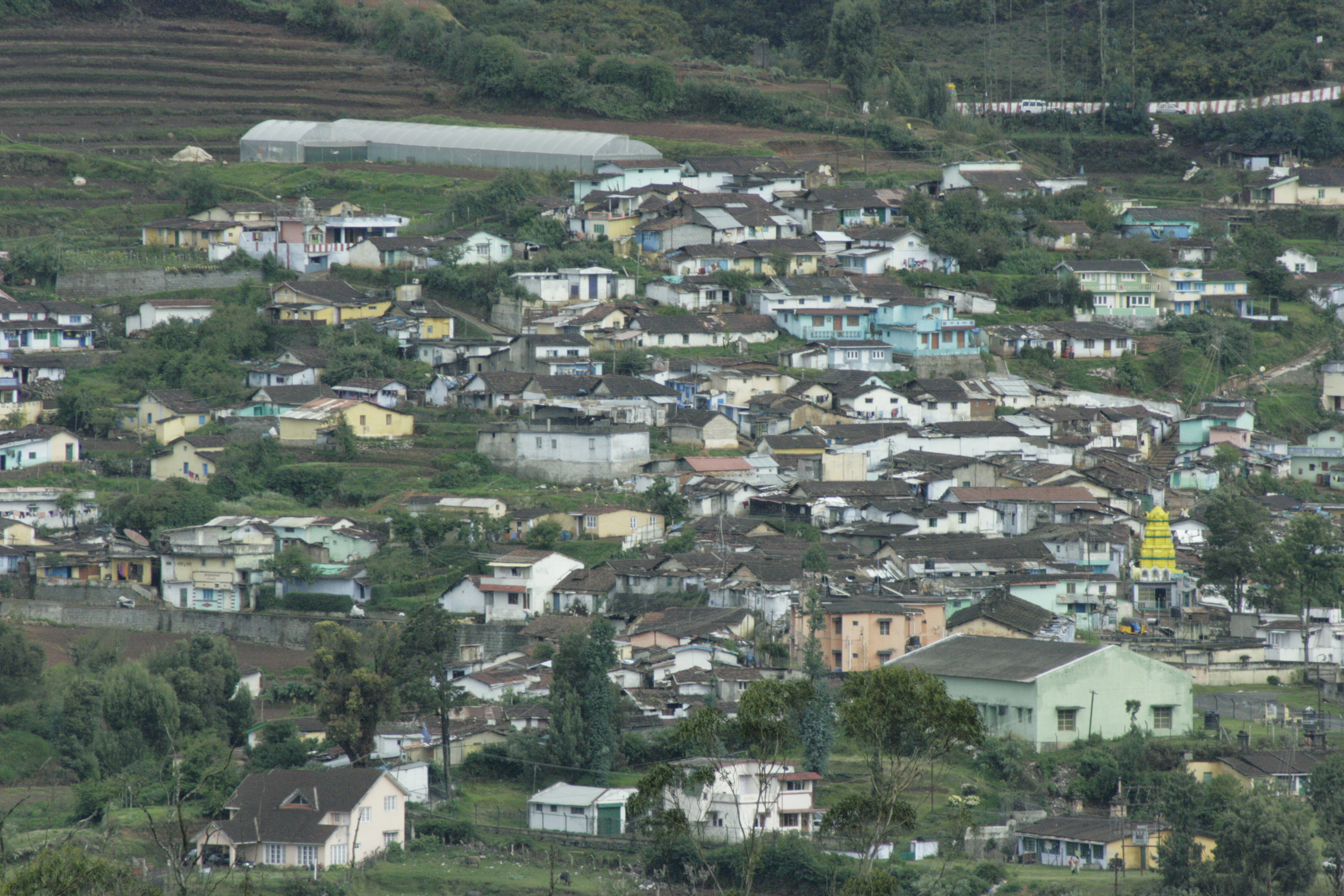
Houses at Ooty

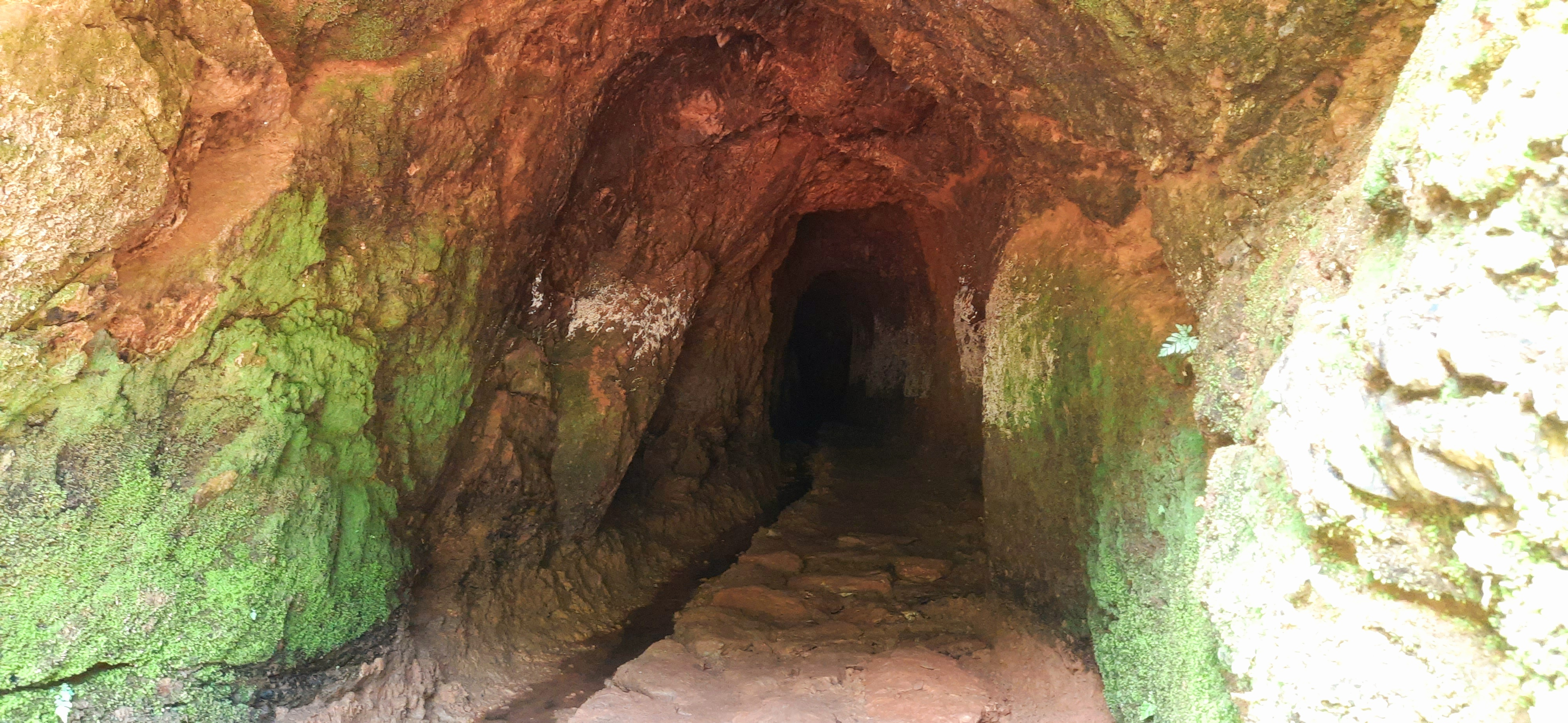
Pazhassi's Cave, Wentworth Estate, Cherambadi

== See also ==
- Coonoor
- Devala, India
- Forest Dale, The Nilgiris
- John Sullivan (British governor)
- Kotagiri
- Kota language
- Kota people (India)
- Mango Orange
- Nambolakotta Temple
- Nilgiri Mountains
- Toda language
- Toda people
- Ooty
- gudalur
- Kappathorai
- Muthorai Palada
- List of districts of Tamil Nadu
- Nilgiris - A Shared Wilderness
