= Vikalp (disambiguation) =

Vikalp may refer to:

- Vikalp, a network of documentary filmmakers

== Seel also ==
- Vikalpa
- Vikalpa (journal)
- Vikalpa (politician)
