= K P Thomas (artist) =

Indian contemporary artist (born 1951)

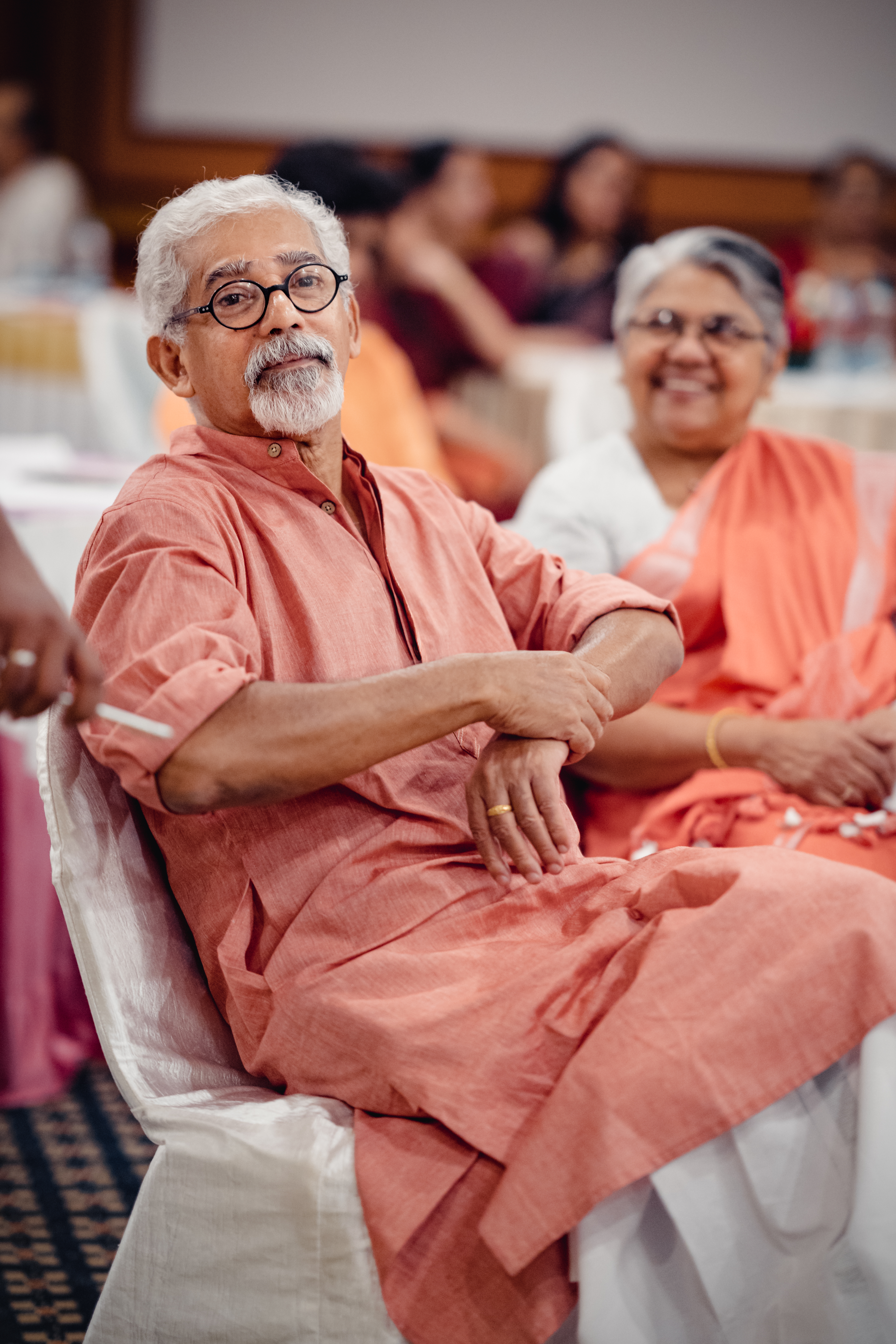
- Born: 9 June 1951 (age 74); Mananthavady, Wayanad, Kerala, India
- Education: Maharaja's College, Ernakulam
- Known for: Social commentary, use of unconventional canvases
- Movement: Social realism
- Awards: Kerala Lalita Kala Akademi Award (1974)

K P Thomas (born 9 June 1951) is an Indian contemporary artist from Kerala, whose works often incorporate unconventional materials and explore social themes. His works have explored themes such as tribal life, environmental degradation, social injustice, and women's experiences. A self-taught artist, he received the Kerala Lalita Kala Akademi Award in 1974 at the age of 22, becoming the youngest recipient at the time.

== Early life and background ==
Kudackachira Philip Thomas was born in Mananthavady, Wayanad, Kerala.

He holds a postgraduate degree in philosophy from Maharaja's College, Ernakulam. Thomas began sketching during his studies, but only took art seriously after receiving the Kerala Lalita Kala Akademi Award for his work Mananthavadian Figures.

Thomas worked as a schoolteacher in Bhutan for a short while, worked at several colleges and eventually went into banking. Due to restrictions on bringing art materials to the office, he repurposed discarded stationery and balance sheets as canvases for his works.

== Artistic career and style ==
=== Media and techniques ===
Thomas uses recycled and unconventional materials such as discarded envelopes, dot matrix prints, receipts, and newspaper. His works often include pre-existing elements like stamps or office markings and he employs media ranging from watercolors, charcoal, pastels, to ink. Thomas frequently works on smaller canvases, where he explores his inner themes with a varied use of color.

=== Artistic philosophy and influences ===
Thomas has stated that his work engages with social realities, often addressing issues such as inequality and marginalisation. According to The Hindu, Thomas "lets his angst, fears, protest, concerns, [and] insecurity flow on to his canvases," with his works commonly addressing social themes. He attributes the development of his artistic sensibilities to relationships with individuals from varied backgrounds, including actor Mammootty, sculptor Kanayi Kunhiraman, and documentary filmmaker K.P. Jayasankar. His art frequently depicts the lives of indigenous people (Adivasis) of Wayanad, drawing on historical and cultural references prior to the migration period.

=== Themes and series ===
Thomas’s body of work engages with social, political, ecological, and spiritual themes. His Mananthavadian Dreams series, for example, focuses on the marginalisation of tribal communities in Mananthavady, Kerala. A recurring motif in his works is the historical tribal chief Karinthandan, sometimes juxtaposed with contemporary figures such as activist C. K. Janu. Thomas’s works also address issues of gender and violence; pieces like Floating Head of Martyr and Fallen Flag engage with political murders and ideological conflicts, while Manipur after Manorama portrays violence against women alongside village life and protesting Manipuri women. Other works such as Trail and The Last Supper explore social and political issues. During the COVID-19 pandemic, Thomas produced a six-work series titled Existence in Pandemic Times, which examines the impact of the pandemic.

== Exhibitions and recognition ==
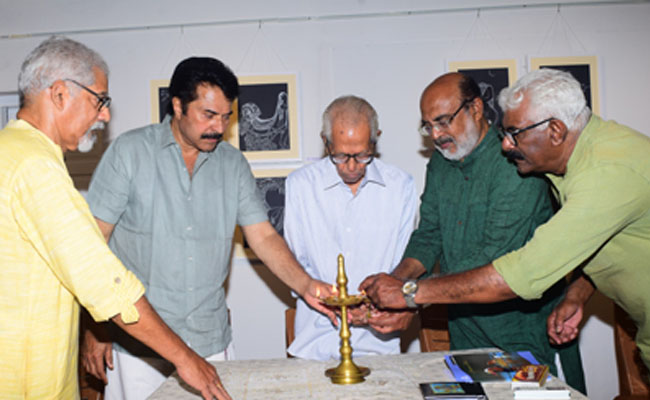
Inauguration of 'Existence in pandemic times' a solo art exhibition by K.P. Thomas

Thomas received the Kerala Lalita Kala Akademi Award in 1974 for Mananthavadian Figures at the age of 22. He has held over 25 solo exhibitions across Indian cities like Delhi, Mumbai, and Bangalore, as well as in various galleries across Kerala.

=== Selected solo exhibitions ===
Month/Year	Exhibition Title	Venue	Details
October 2011	Colourful Ode to Freedom	Vyloppilly Samskrithi Bhavan, Thiruvananthapuram	Combining symbolism and found materials
November 2013	Illustrations of Untold Stories	Vyloppilly Samskrithi Bhavan, Thiruvananthapuram	Thematic exhibition on social justice
April 2014	Dripping Colours	Durbar Hall Ground, Kochi	Emphasizing women's issues and ecological loss
March 2023	Existence in Pandemic Times	Nirvana Art Collective, Mattancherry	Inaugurated by Mammootty, T. M. Thomas Isaac, and M. K. Sanu
August 2023	Retrospection	Alliance française, Thiruvananthapuram	Retrospective artworks spanning 53 years
November 2024	Soliloquy	Vyloppilly Samskriti Bhavan, Thiruvananthapuram	Themed around internal monologues and artistic solitude
May 2025	Soliloquy	Durbar Hall Ground, Kochi	Inaugurated by V. P. Gangadharan

=== Selected group exhibitions ===
Month/Year	Exhibition Title	Venue	Details
January 2013	Contemporary Art Fair	Kanakakunnu Palace, Thiruvananthapuram	Convened by K.P. Thomas and sculptor Kanayi Kunhiraman, sponsored by South Indian Bank. Featured 350 artworks by over 250 artists
