= Naga Story: The Other Side of Silence =

- Promotional poster
- Directed by: Gopal Menon
- Screenplay by: Gopal Menon
- Produced by: Other Media Communications; Deenadayalan
- Cinematography: Rajeev Ravi; Gopal Menon
- Edited by: B. Ajithkumar
- Music by: Chandran Veyattummal
- Release date: 2003
- Running time: 64 minutes
- Country: India
- Languages: Nagamese, Manipuri, English and 14 Naga languages with English subtitles

Naga Story: The Other Side of Silence is a 2003 documentary film by Indian film maker Gopal Menon. The film provides an introduction to the history of the Struggle by Naga people in North- East frontier of the Indian subcontinent, and documents the human rights abuses suffered by the Naga people in more than 50 years of the existence of Independent India. The Naga political struggle is one of the oldest nationality movements in South Asia, continuing till present times. This film, which took 5 years to complete, is the first comprehensive film about the Naga struggle for identity, peace, and justice.

This film was the Winner of the "Spirit of the Himalayas" First Prize at Netherlands Himalayas Film Festival, Amsterdam, 2004. This Film was withdrawn from Mumbai International Film Festival 2004 by Film Makers along with 6 other films as part of the Campaign Against Censorship by Indian filmmakers and screened at the Protest film festival Vikalp

== Festivals ==
- Telluride Mountain Film Festival, USA
- Banff Mountain Film Festival, Canada
- The Netherlands Himalayas Filmfestival 2004, Amsterdam
- Vikalp: Films for Freedom 2004
- Celebrating Resistances: Peoples Action Week Film Festival 2005
- Signs 2005
- Cochin International Film Festival – 2005
- Kontra Agos:Resistance Film Festival 2007, Ortigas
- Nepal International Indigenous Film Festival 2010

=== Accolades ===
- The Netherlands Himalayas Film Festival 2004: "Spirit of the Himalayas" First Prize

== See also ==
- Indian general election, 2014 (Nagaland)
- Insurgency in Northeast India
- Gopal Menon filmography
