= Gopal Menon =

Indian documentaries and short films

Gopal Menon is an Indian independent filmmaker and activist known for his documentaries on human rights issues. In the early noughties, he gained international recognition for Hey Ram: Genocide in the Land of Gandhi (2002), the first film made about the Gujarat pogrom, and Naga Story: The Other Side of Silence (2003), which won an award at The Netherlands Himalayas Film Festival. His other notable films include Let the Butterflies Fly (2012) about violence against transgender people, and Resilient Rhythms (2002) about dalit responses to marginalisation in India. His films about the violence in Kashmir include PAPA 2 (2002) and The Broken Camera (2020).

== Biography ==
Originally from Calicut in Kerala, Menon began working on documentaries at age 19, when he was a student of English literature, active in student politics. While studying for his MBA at PSG Institute of Management in Coimbatore, Tamil Nadu, he worked with activist C R Bijoy of the People's Union for Civil Liberties, and documented organised violence against Muslims in the city.

After working as a film editor on A Wounded Valley (1998), Menon became interested in making films about the conflict in Kashmir. Unable to get a producer for a feature-length film, he made a 28-minute film about disappearances linked to the Papa II military interrogation centre. PAPA 2, his first film as an independent filmmaker, took two years to release due to its controversial subject. His next documentary, Hey Ram: Genocide in the Land of Gandhi, which he filmed within 3 weeks of the 2002 riots in Gujarat, was screened internationally in the United States, Europe, Japan, and South Asia.

Menon's first feature-length film was Naga Story: The Other Side of Silence (2003) about the Naga people in Nagaland, which won the "Spirit of the Himalayas" prize at The Netherlands Himalayas Film Festival. Another film, Let the Butterflies Fly (2012) about harassment and violence against transgender people, won an award at the Kashish Mumbai International Queer Film Festival.

His other credits include working as a location director, location producer, and cameraman for the ITV documentary Hindu Nationalism in the UK (2002). He was also location producer and researcher for the BBC television series, India: The Modi Question (2023).

== Documentaries ==
=== As producer and editor ===
| Year | Title | Notes | Ref. |
|---|---|---|---|
| 1994 | Destruction of Tropical Evergreen Forest | As a student, Menon produced this documentary about the destruction of tropical evergreen forests within the Nilgiri biosphere, the mountain range across Tamil Nadu, Karnataka, and Kerala. | |
| 1998 | The Wounded Valley | A 7-minute film about violence in Kashmir which Menon edited using Hi8 footage. | |

=== As director ===
| Year | Title | Notes | Ref. |
|---|---|---|---|
| 2002 | PAPA 2 | A 28-minute film about enforced disappearances in Kashmir valley, which gets it title from the Papa II military interrogation centre in Srinagar. Shot by Menon with a hand-held camera. First screened in London after screenings of Hey Ram (2002). | |
| 2002 | Hey Ram: Genocide in the Land of Gandhi | A 28-minute documentary about violence in Gujarat in 2002. He filmed within 3 weeks of the 2002 riots, making it the first film about the pogrom, and interviewed 80 to 90 victims, 15 of whom are featured. Released through the Delhi Constitutional Club, it was screened internationally in the United States, Europe, Japan, and South Asia. | |
| 2002 | Resilient Rhythms | Explores dalit responses to their marginalisation in the caste system in India. Shot in 10 states starting in 1998. | |
| 2003 | Naga Story: The Other Side of Silence | A 64-minute film about the history of the Naga people in Nagaland. It took nearly five years for Menon to complete the film. Won "Spirit of the Himalayas" prize at The Netherlands Himalayas Film Festival. | |
| 2005 | Of Inhuman Bondage | A film on women and children engaged in manual scavenging. | |
| 2009 | When the State Declares War on the People | First screened at the Delhi Press Club in 2009, the 23-minute documentary was accepted as evidence in a rape case in Chhattisgarh. Includes footage of a one-year-old baby whose four fingers are chopped off by security forces including the Central Reserve Police Force (CRPF). | |
| 2010 | Marching Towards Freedom | Menon traveled to 20 states to film this documentary about manual scavenging, a widespread practice in which households illegally pay workers to clean latrines and carry human excreta on their heads to the nearest drain. Despite being banned by law in 1993, an estimated 300,000 manual scavengers were operating in India as of 2011, most of them women who were "Bhangis" from the dalit caste. The film was commissioned by Bezwada Wilson, founder of Safai Karamchari Andolan. | |
| 2012 | Let the Butterflies Fly | An exposé of how a Bengaluru police officer, a doctor, and the local media were complicit in forcing a young adult to undergo surgery to reverse their gender transition. Won a prize at the Kashish Mumbai International Queer Film Festival for best documentary feature. | |
| 2014 | The Killing Fields of Muzaffarnagar | Menon camped in Western Uttar Pradesh for 3 months to film the documentary about the 2013 Muzaffarnagar riots. | |
| 2014 | The Unholy War–Part 1: In the Name of Development | Menon directed, filmed, and produced the two-part series on Gujarat between 2002 and 2014. | |
| 2014 | The Unholy War–Part 2: In Search of Justice | Menon directed, filmed, and produced the two-part series on Gujarat between 2002 and 2014. | |
| 2017 | I Am Hadiya | Produced by the National Federation of Human Rights Organisation (NFHRO). Tells the story about human rights violations against 25-year-old Hadiya who was being abused and kept at home sedated by her parents. | |
| 2020 | The Broken Camera – My Road Reel 2020 | A 3-minute short film telling the story of how photojournalist Xuhaib Maqbool Hamza lost an eye in 2016. While covering a non-violent protest, he was sprayed with 250 pellets including 2 in his retina and underwent 3 surgeries. | |

== Dramatisations ==
| Year | Title | Notes | Ref. |
|---|---|---|---|
| 2024 | Madithattu (In the Lap) | A 35-minute short film about a woman raising an intellectually disabled teenage daughter. The film stars Devi Ajith as the mother Shobhana and Sreelakshmi as the daughter Sangeetha. Menon won Best Short Film Director at the 2024 Orissa International Film Festival for this film. | |
