= Vikalp =

Network of documentary filmmakers

Vikalp (Films for Freedom) is a network of documentary filmmakers and others interested in this issue, from India. It defines itself as a "platform to defend freedom of expression and to resist censorship." Currently, India has a film certification (earlier called a censorship) board, the functioning of which has raises concerns specially among documentary filmmakers. Vikalp has an associated website called Films For Freedom.

== Response to "censorship" ==
In February 2004, Mumbai played home to Vikalp: Films For Freedom, which was a six-day-long festival of documentary films. It ran parallel to the Mumbai International Film Festival MIFF 2004, and was managed by filmmakers itself. The festival screened all films rejected by the MIFF 2004, and over a dozen films withdrawn from the MIFF by filmmakers to protest what they called "covert censorship-by-selection."

== Archives of Indian independent film ==
Films For Freedom, India's website carries an archive of Indian independent films made after 2002. Members of this network are able to post new films, reviews, list potential venues for screenings and participate in the related discussion group. Viewers are also able to invite films for screenings in their localities.

== Part of Campaign Against Censorship ==
Vikalp is a part of the Campaign Against Censorship in India. It says it "seeks to support the independent documentary movement in India and to promote alternative ways of seeing."

== Key names ==
Some of its key members include that Tata Institute of Social Sciences-based filmmakers Anjali Monteiro and K.P. Jayasankar of the Centre for Media and Cultural Studies.
