= Wayanad district =

District in Kerala, India

Wayanad
- District
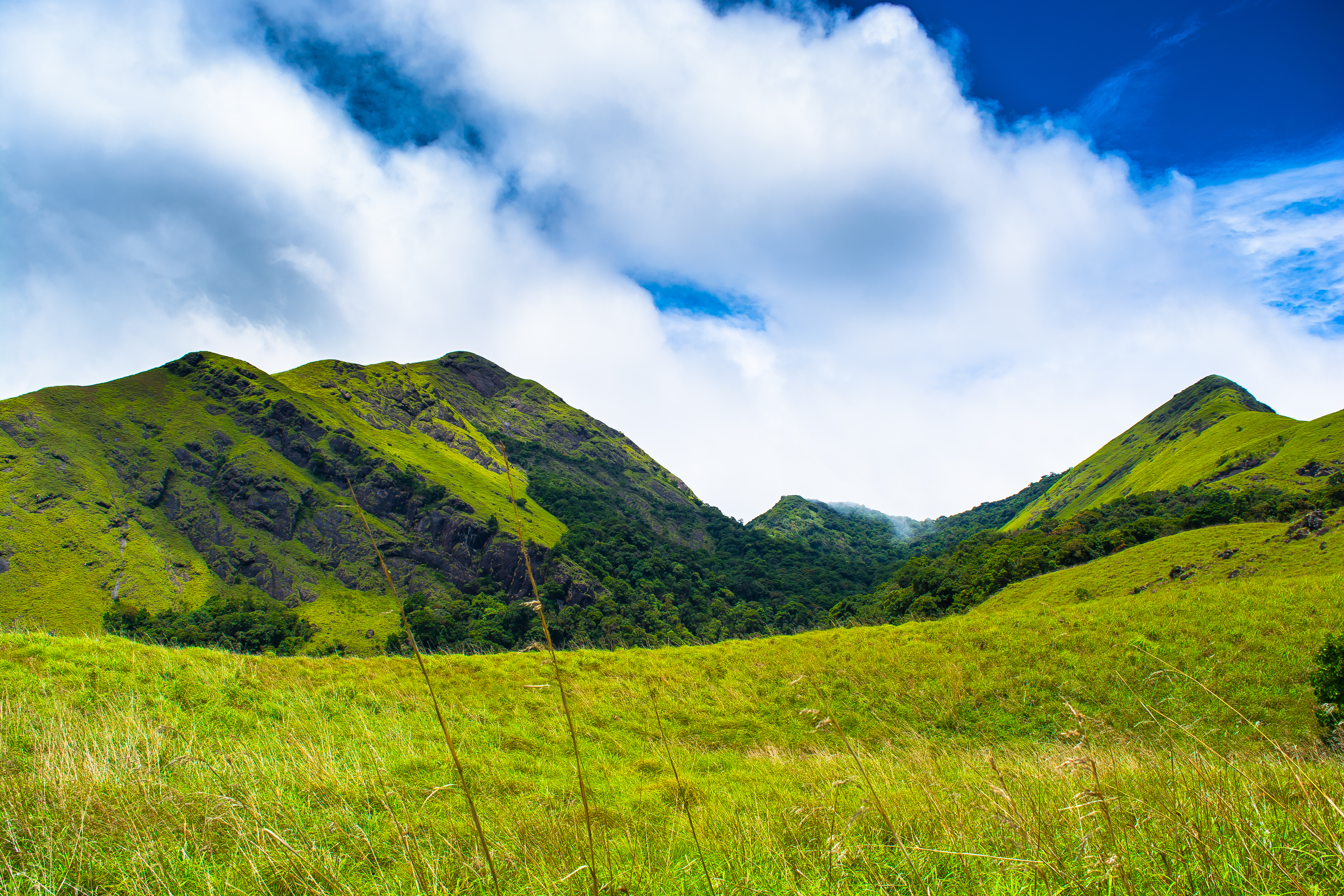
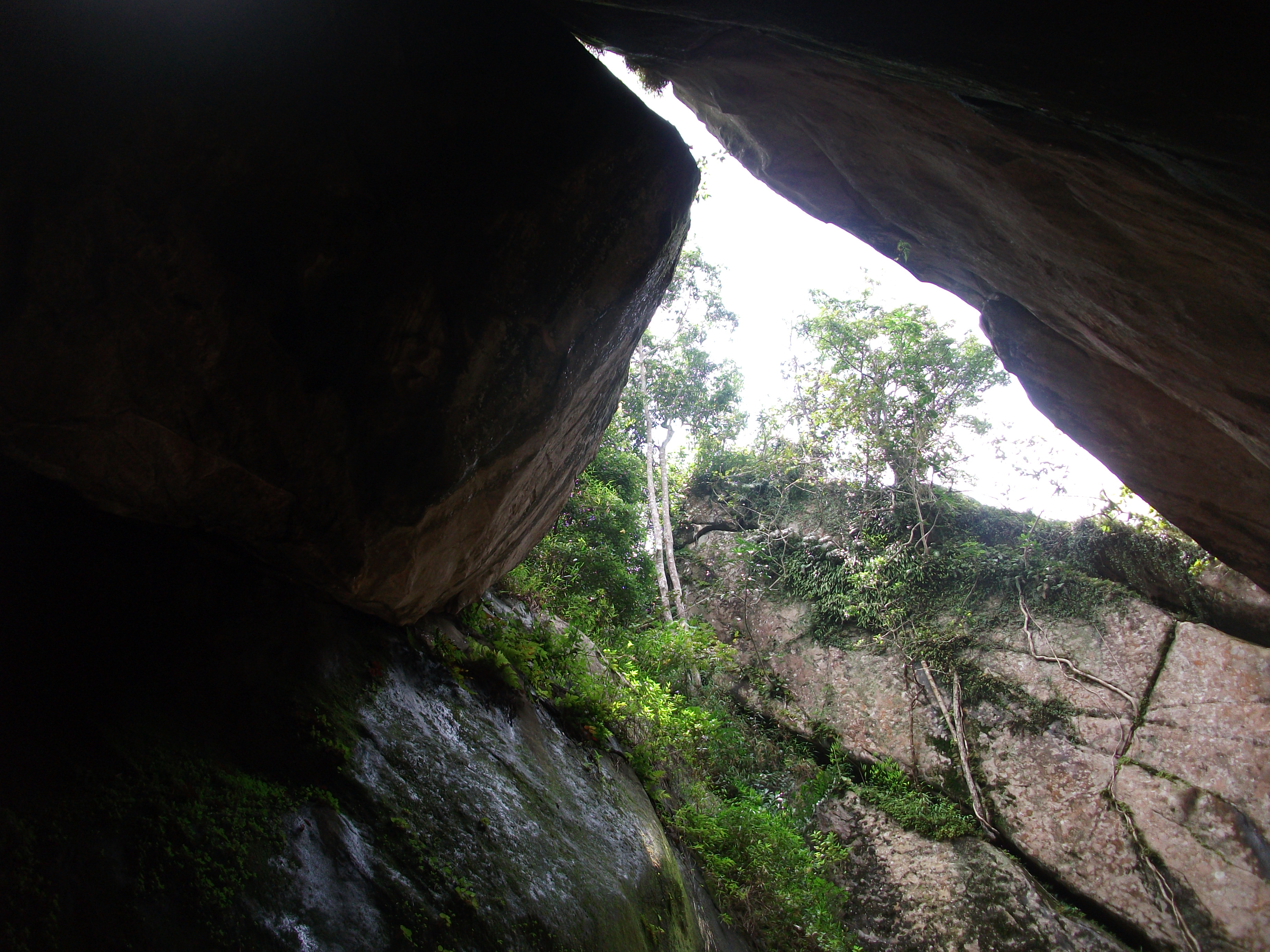
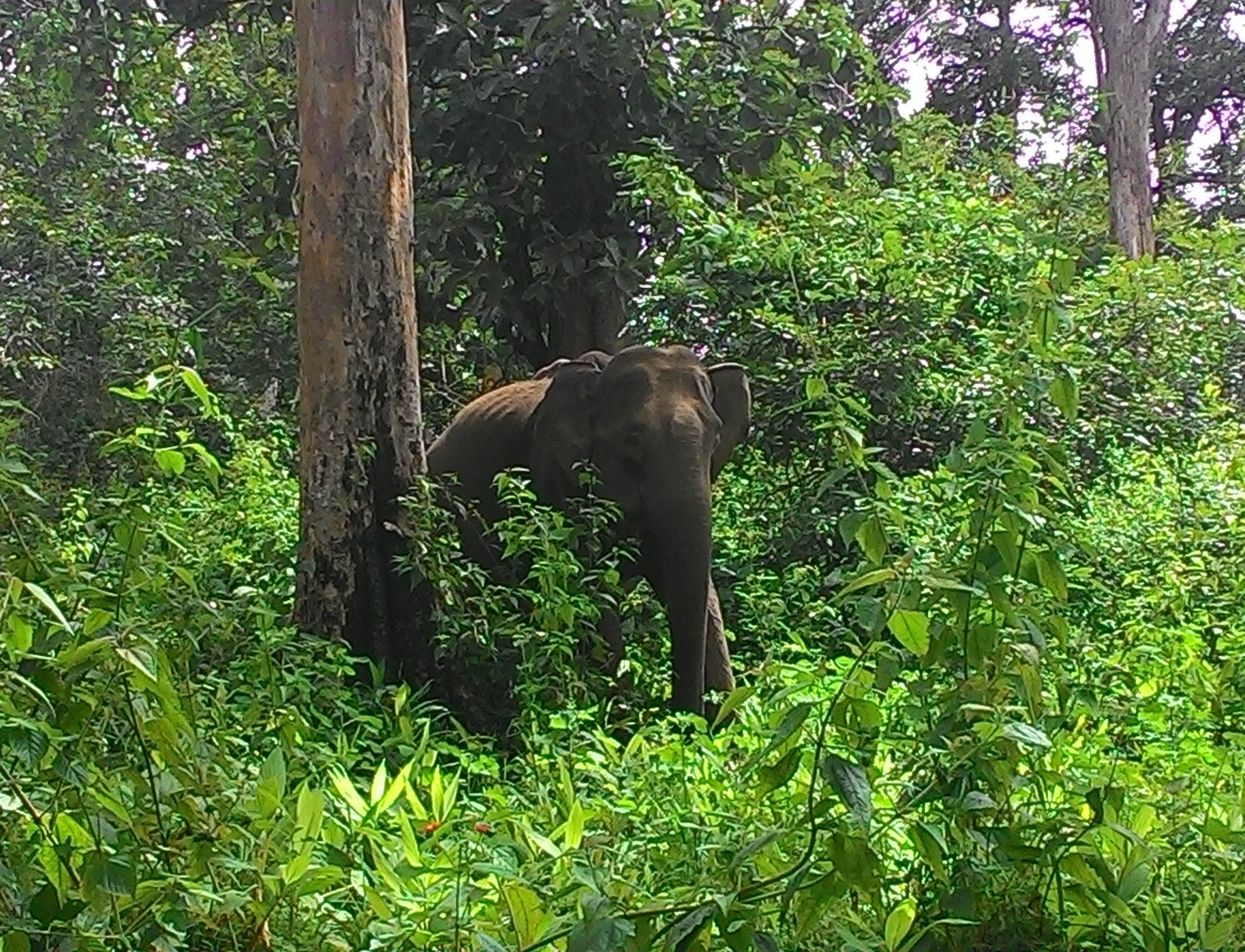
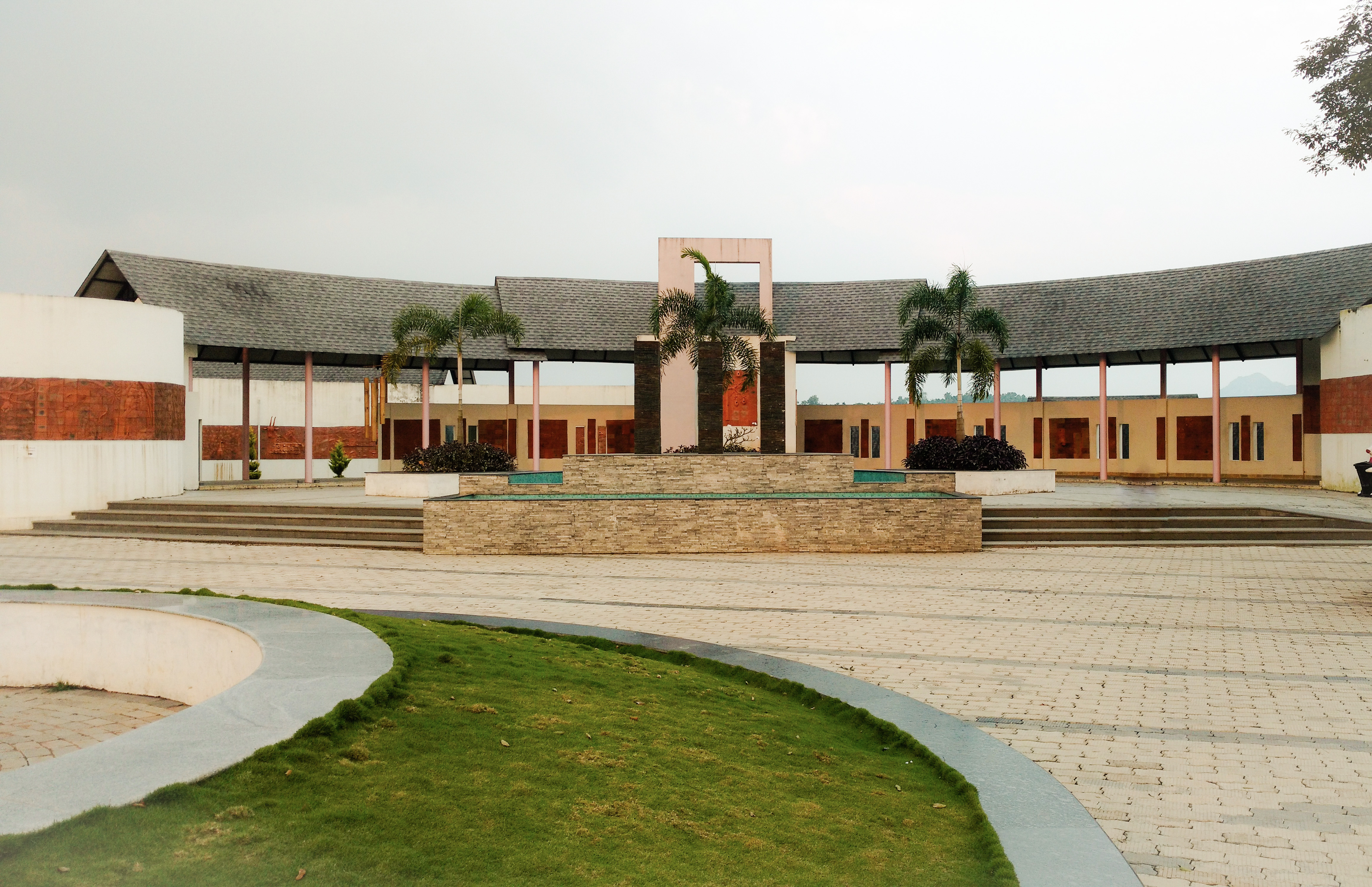
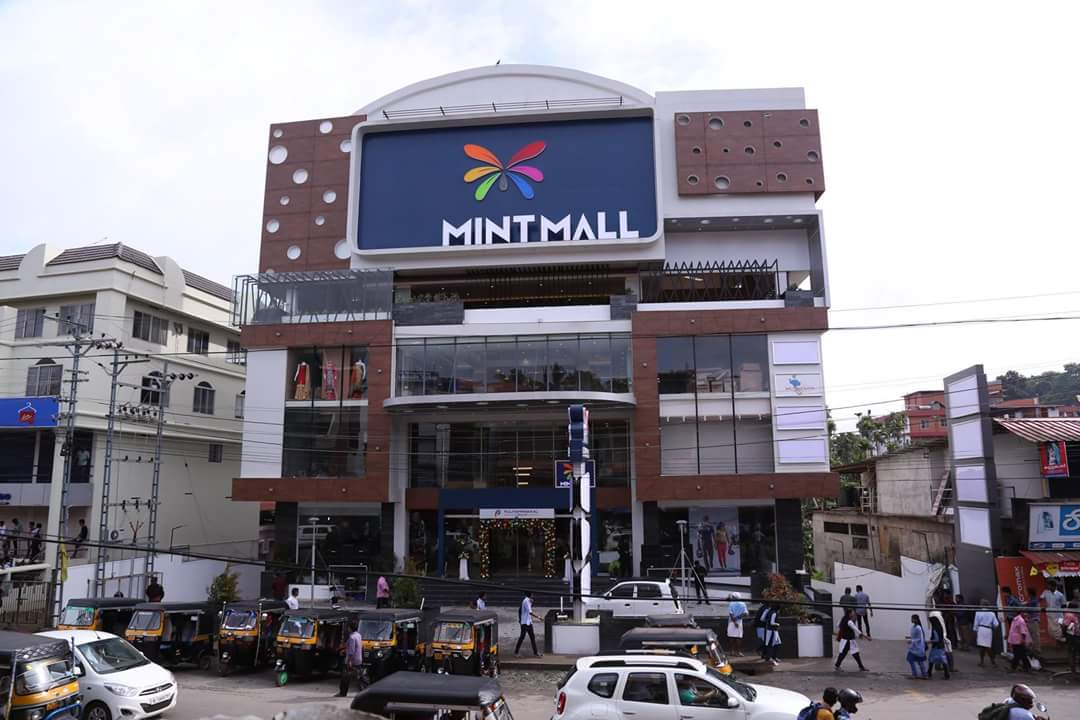
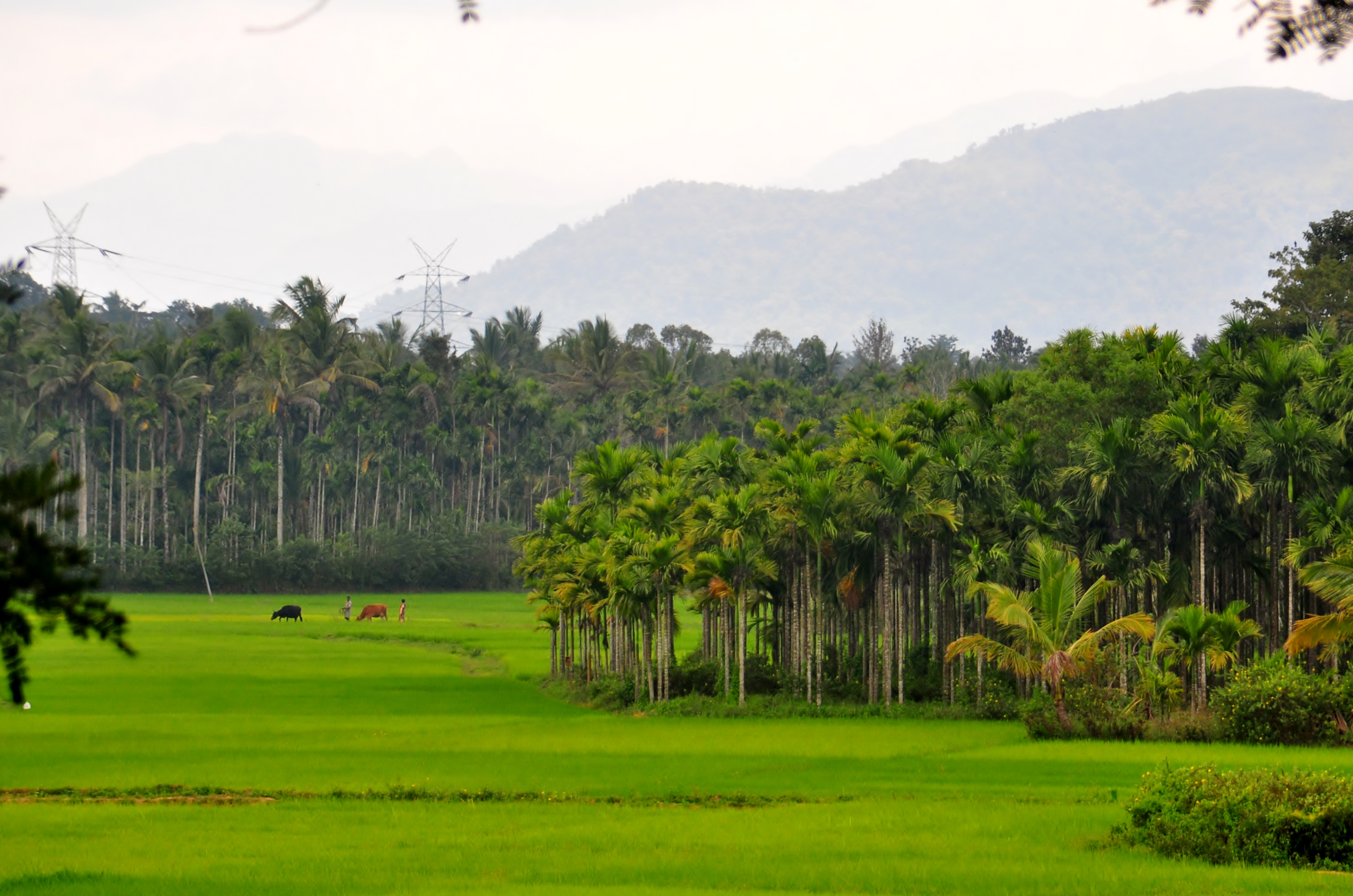
- Clockwise from top: Chembra Peak, Wayanad Wildlife Sanctuary, Mall at Sulthan Bathery, Paddy fields, Entrance of Karapuzha Dam, Edakkal Caves
- Etymology: Vayal Nadu: land of paddy fields
- Motto: "Way Beyond"
- Location within Kerala
- Coordinates: 11°37′35″N 76°05′20″E
- Country: India
- State: Kerala
- District Formation: 1980 November 1; 45 years ago
- Headquarters: Kalpetta
- Sub-divisions: List: Revenue divisions: (1); Mananthavady Taluks: (3); Vythiri; Manathavady; Sulthanbathery

Government
  - Body: District administration of Wayanad
  - District in-charge Minister: T. Siddique
  - District Collector: D.R. Meghasree (IAS)
  - District Police Chief: Arun K.P IPS
  - Member of Parliament, Lok Sabha: Priyanka Gandhi Vadra

Area
  - Total: 2,132 km^{2} (823 sq mi)
  - Rank: 12th
- Highest elevation (Vellarimala): 2,240 m (7,350 ft)
- Lowest elevation (Chali Puzha, Malappuram border): 108 m (354 ft)

Population (2018)
  - Total: 846,637
  - Density: 397/km^{2} (1,030/sq mi)
- Time zone: UTC+05:30 (IST)
- STD Code: 4936, 4935
- ISO 3166 code: IN-KL
- Vehicle registration: KL-12 Kalpetta, KL-72 Mananthavady, KL-73 Sultan Bathery, KLW (1980–1989)
- HDI (2005): ▲0.753 ( High)
- Website: wayanad.gov.in

Wayanad district (Malayalam: [ʋɐjɐnaːɖɨ̆]), or Wynad, is a district in the north-east of the Indian state of Kerala, with its administrative headquarters at the municipality of Kalpetta. It is the only plateau in Kerala. The Wayanad Plateau forms a continuation of the Mysore Plateau, the southern portion of the Deccan Plateau. It is set high in the Western Ghats with altitudes ranging from 700 to 2,100 meters and some areas resemble to Eastern Ghats including Kolagapara, Kurumbalakotta and some parts of Vadakkanad and Chekadi. Vellari Mala, a 2,240 m (7,349 ft) high peak situated on the trijunction of Wayanad, Malappuram, and Kozhikode districts, is the highest point in Wayanad district. The district was formed on 1 November 1980 as the 12th district in Kerala, by carving out areas from Kozhikode and Kannur districts. An area of 885.92 km^{2} in the district is forested. Wayanad has three municipal towns—Kalpetta, Mananthavady and Sulthan Bathery. There are many indigenous tribes in this area. The Kabini River, a tributary of the Kaveri River, originates at Wayanad. Wayanad district, along with the Chaliyar valley in the neighbouring Nilambur (Eastern Eranad region) in Malappuram district, is known for natural gold fields, which are also seen in other parts of the Nilgiri Biosphere Reserve. The Chaliyar river, which is the fourth longest river of Kerala, originates on the Wayanad plateau. The historically important Edakkal Caves are located in Wayanad district.

Wayanad district is bordered by Karnataka (Kodagu, Chamarajanagar and Mysore districts) to the north and north-east, Tamil Nadu (Nilgiris district) to the south-east (it is the only district that shares border with both the neighbouring states of Kerala), Malappuram to the south, Kozhikode to the south-west and Kannur to the north-west. Pulpally in Wayanad boasts the only Lava-Kusha temple in Kerala and Vythiri has the only mirror temple in Kerala, which is a Jain temple. Varambetta mosque is the oldest Muslim mosque of Wayanad. Wayanad is famous for its role in the Cotiote War, where Pazhassi Raja with the help of the Kurichya tribe in association with Hindus and Muslims of the Malabar region launched a revolt against the British. Kaniyambetta and Muttil Panchayaths are the centrally located Panchayaths with the best access from all corners of Wayanad, while Tavinjal Panchayath is on the northeast border with Kannur district. The edicts found in the caves of Ambukuthi Mala are evidence that occupation dates from the beginning of the New Age Civilisation.

== Etymology ==
The name 'Wayanad' is derived from 'vayal nāḍŭ' (Tamil / Malayalam) which translates to 'the land of paddy fields' in English.

== Formation ==
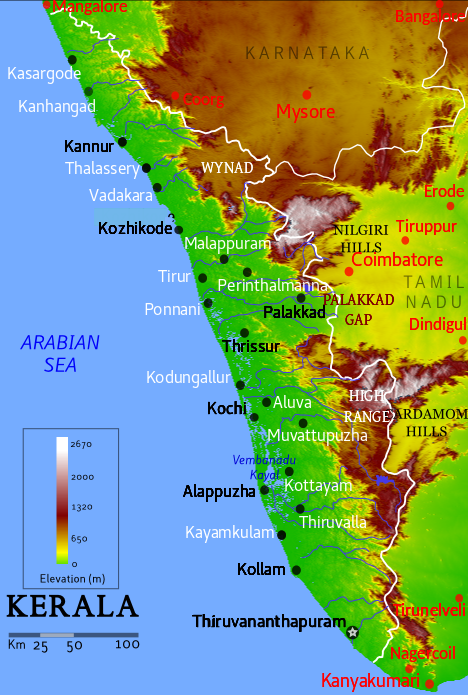
Topography of Wayanad on Mysore Plateau

Wayanad district lies in the Bayalu Seeme region (highland) of the Nilgiri Biosphere Reserve. Geographically it is similar to the neighbouring districts of Kodagu and Mysore of Karnataka, and Nilgiris of Tamil Nadu. Wayanad plateau forms a continuation of the Mysore Plateau.

During the British Raj, Wayanad was a taluk in the erstwhile Malabar District. The regions included in the taluks of Gudalur and Pandalur in the present-day Nilgiris district, also known as Southeast Wayanad, formed part of the erstwhile Wayanad taluk. Southeast Wayanad was part of Malabar District until 31 March 1877, when it was transferred to the neighbouring Nilgiris district due to the heavy population of Malabar and the small area of Nilgiris. Wayanad was a separate revenue division within the Malabar District until 1924.

During the States Reorganisation of 1956 after the independence of India, the Mysore state (present-day Karnataka) claimed Wayanad due to its historical and geographical peculiarities. However the linguistic survey of the 1951 census of India found that 87.5% of the total population of Wayanad were native speakers of Malayalam at that time, while just 6.2% of the total population spoke Kannada.

On 1 January 1957, the erstwhile Malabar District was divided into three: Kannur, Kozhikode, and Palakkad. On the same day Wayanad taluk was split up into North Wayanad and South Wayanad. Initially both of the taluks of Wayanad were included in newly formed Kannur district. However, two months later on 15 March 1957, South Wayanad taluk was transferred into Kozhikode district. The North Wayanad Taluk was transferred to Kozhikode district on 1 January 1979.

Wayanad district was formed by incorporating the taluks of North Wayanad and South Wayanad on 1 November 1980 as the 12th district of Kerala. On the same date, North Wayanad Taluk was renamed as Mananthavady, and South Wayanad was split to form the taluks of Sultan Bathery and Vythiri. Kalpetta in Vythiri taluk became the headquarters of the new district.

== History ==
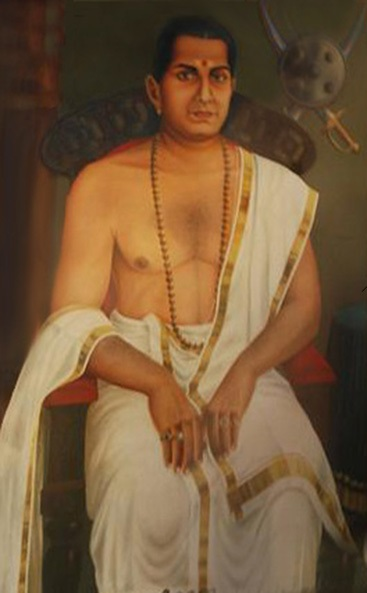
Veera Kerala Varma Pazhassi Raja, painting by Raja Ravi Varma

=== Pre-history ===
Historians believe that human settlements have existed in these parts from at least 1,000 BCE. Much evidence of New Stone Age civilisation can be seen in the hills throughout the present-day Wayanad district. The Edakkal Caves have 6000-year-old rock engravings from the Neolithic age. The recorded history of this district is available only from the 18th century. In ancient times, this land was ruled by the Rajas of the Veda tribe.

=== Ezhimala kingdom ===
In the earliest part of the recorded history of Wayanad District, Kasaragod-Kannur-Wayanad-Kozhikode Districts in the northern part of present-day Kerala were ruled by the Nannans (Mushika dynasty) who later came to be known as the Kolathiris. Politically the area was part of the Ezhimala Kingdom, with its capital at Ezhimala in present-day Kannur district. The most famous king of Ezhimala was Nannan, whose kingdom extended up to Gudalur, Nilgiris and northern parts of Coimbatore. It is said that Nannan took refuge in the Wayanad hills in the 5th century CE when he was lost to Cheras, just before his death in battle, according to the Sangam works. Wayanad was part of the Karkanad, which included the eastern regions of the Ezhimala kingdom (Wayanad-Gudalur areas including part of Kodagu (Coorg)). Karkanad along with Poozhinadu, which contained much of the coastal belt wedged between Mangalore and Kozhikode was under Ezhimala kingdom with a headquarters at Ezhimala.

Some linguists say that an inscription found in the Edakkal Caves in Wayanad, from the 3rd century CE (approximately 1,800 years old), is the oldest known inscription in Malayalam, as it contains two modern Malayalam words, Ee (this) and pazhama (old). Historian M. R. Raghava Varier, a specialist in Edakkal cave inscriptions, stated that this would be a 'dangerous interpretation of the script'. Varier, who discovered the inscription read it as 'Sri Vazhumi' meaning 'Sri Brahma' in Tamil and dated it to 3rd–4th century CE, whereas Vedachalam, read it as 'Vazhumi' and dated it to 5th–6th century CE.

=== Kolathunadu ===
The Mooshaka kings were considered descendants of Nannan. By the 14th century, Mooshaka Kingdom was known as Kolathirinad and its rulers as Kolathiris. The Kolathunad Kingdom at the peak of its power reportedly extended from the Netravati River (Mangalore) in the north to Korapuzha (Kozhikode) in the south with Arabian Sea on the west and Kodagu hills on the eastern boundary, also including the isolated islands of Lakshadweep in Arabian Sea.

=== Kingdom of Kottayam ===
The Kolathiri Dominion emerged into independent 10 principalities i.e., Kadathanadu (Vadakara), Randathara or Poyanad (Dharmadom), Kottayam (Thalassery), Nileshwaram, Iruvazhinadu (Panoor), Kurumbranad etc., under separate royal chieftains due to the outcome of internal dissensions. The Nileshwaram dynasty on the northernmost part of Kolathiri dominion, were relatives to both Kolathunadu as well as Zamorin of Calicut, in the early medieval period.

The origin of Kottayam royal family (the Kottayam referred here is Kottayam-Malabar near Thalassery, not to be confused with Kottayam in Southern Kerala) is lost in obscurity. It has been stated that the Raja of Kottayam set up a semi-independent principality of his own at the expense of Kolathiris. In the 10th century CE, the region comprised erstwhile Taluks of Kottayam, Wayanad and Gudallur was called Puraikizhanad and its feudal lord Puraikizhars. The Thirunelly inscriptions refer to the division of Puraikizhar family into two branches viz., Elder (Muthukur) and Younger (Elamkur) in the beginning of the 11th century. In the 17th century Kottayam-Malabar was the capital of Puraikizhanad (Puranattukara) Rajas. It was divided into three branches i.e., Eastern, Western and Southern under separate dignitaries known as Mootha, Elaya and Munnarkur Rajas. The Kottayam Rajas extended their influence up to the border of Kodagu. By the end of the 17th century, they shared the area of Thalassery taluk with the Iruvazhinadu Nambiars and were in possession of North Wayanad and the small Village of Thamarassery which formed the Eastern portion of the present Vadakara, Quilandy and Thamarassery taluks.

Thamarassery pass which connects Wayanad with the city of Kozhikode was laid in the 18th century by Tipu Sultan, the ruler of Mysore. In 930 AD, emperor Erayappa of Ganga dynasty led his troops to south west of Mysore and after conquering, called it Bayalnad meaning the land of swamps. After Erayappa, his sons Rachamalla and Battunga fought each other for the new kingdom of their father's legacy. Rachamalla was killed and Battunga became the undisputed ruler of Bayalnad. In the 12th century CE, Gangas were dethroned from Bayalnad by Kadamba dynasty of North Canara. In 1104 CE, Vishnuvardhana of Hoysala invaded Bayalnad followed by Vijayanagara dynasty in the 16th century. In 1610 CE, Udaiyar Raja Wadiyar of Mysore drove out Vijayanagara General and became the ruler of Bayalnad and the Nilgiris. This Bayalnad is the native Kannada name from which Wayanad, its Malayali version, the present name of the district, is derived.

=== The Early Kadambas ===
Historian Sanu Kainikara states that with the end of the Sangam period, the 4th and 5th centuries brought trouble for the Cheras (who ruled entire Kerala and Kanyakumari District and adjoining areas), in that they lost control over some parts of Kerala which included Wayanad District due to the growing Kadamba power and superiority. This is indicated by the Kadamba inscriptions in Edakal caves of Wayanad.

A contemporary Buddhist work claims that the Kalabhra king Achuta Vikkanta defeated the 3 traditional southern dynasties – Pandya, Chera, and Chola, and even held all their three kings captive. For nearly five centuries, from 5th–10th century CE, the Cheras were reduced to the status of insignificant rulers due to their inability to avoid foreign invasions. They barely clung on to power with very minimal territory and had to survive at the mercy of their northern powerful imperial empires from Karnataka like the Kadambas, the Badami Chalukyas, the Rashtrakutas and the Kalyani Chalukyas, who invaded and moved through their realm as and when they pleased.

=== The Kutumbiyas (Kudumbiyas) ===
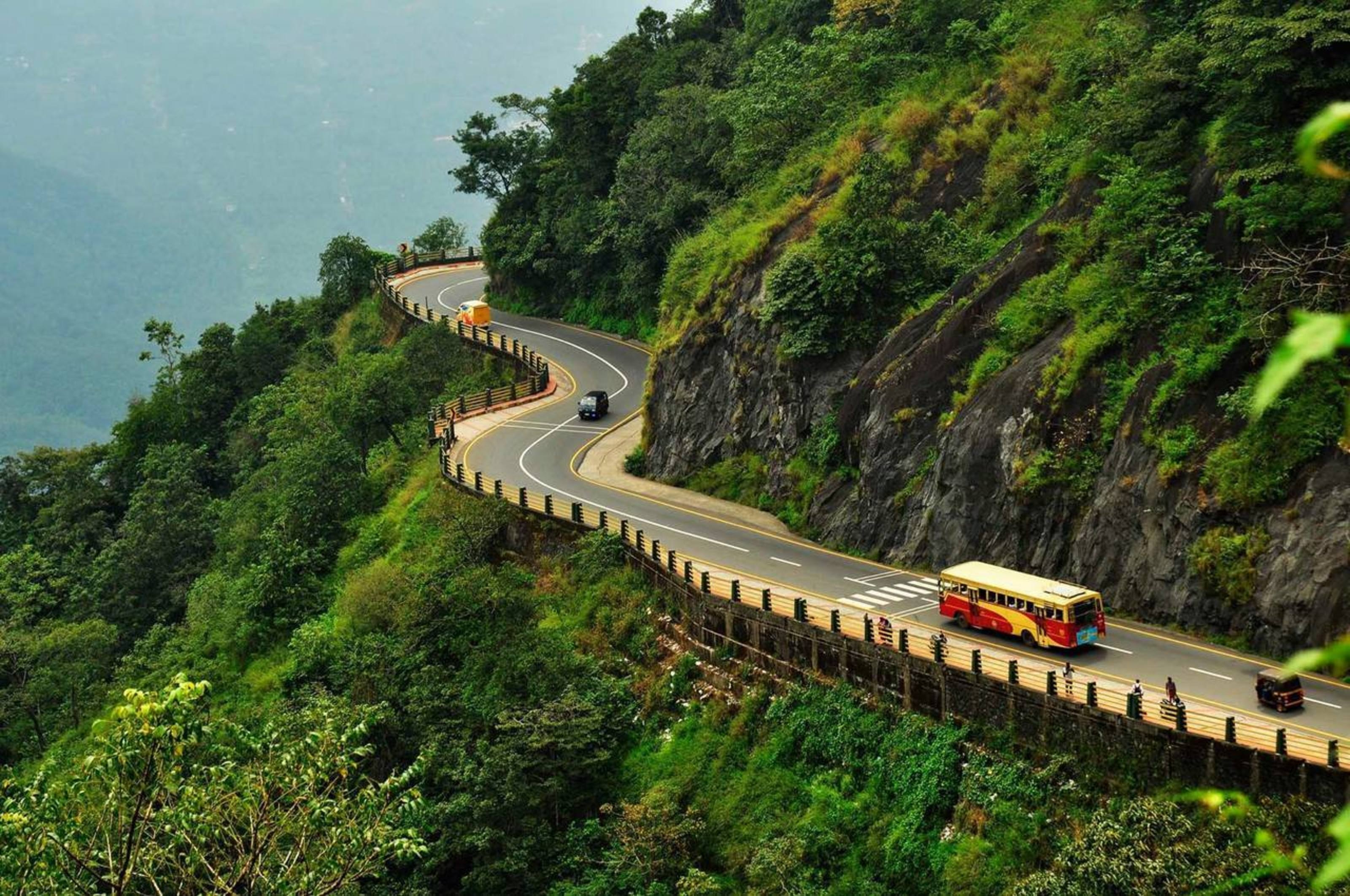
Thamarassery Churam

The two caves of Ampukuthimala (Edakal Caves) in Sulthan Bathery, with pictures on their walls and pictorial writings, speak volumes of a bygone civilisation. At the foot of the Edakal Male (hill) caves, Kannada inscriptions belonging to Canarese chieftain Vishnu Varma of Kutumbiya (Kudumbiya) clan of Mysore dating to c. 5th century CE were discovered which read – Palapulitaanamtakaari (or Pala pulinânam ta-kâri), Sri Vishnu Varma Kutumbiya Kulavardhanasya li..it..a.. As per Hultzch, a Chennai epigraphist, it speaks of the glorious descendant of Kutumbiya clan, Kannada chieftain, Vishnu Varma, as one who killed many tigers.

=== The Badami Chalukyas ===
The inscriptions of the Badami Chalukyas under their founding emperor Pulakeshin I (reign c. 540-567 CE), claim to have defeated the Cheras and the Ezhil Malai rulers, which could be a Pandya dynasty reference, and also annexed the entire Malabar region to their empire. The Pandya, Chera and Chola powers strategised and combinedly attacked the Chalukyas as an alliance in order to avoid repeated reversals.

However, the confederacy was defeated and the Chera king was forced to pay a heavier price, in tribute and indemnity, than his two allies for their misadventure as the Chalukyas had gotten to know the identities of the persons responsible for forming the confederacy.

=== The (Western) Gangas ===
The recorded history of the Wayanad district exists only from the 10th century onward. In 930 CE, emperor Erayappa of Ganga dynasty led his troops to south west of Mysore and after conquering, called it Bayalnad meaning the land of swamps. After Erayappa, his sons Rachamalla and Battunga fought each other for the new kingdom of their father's legacy. Rachamalla was killed and Battunga became the undisputed ruler of Bayalnad.

=== The Later Kadambas ===
In the 11th century AD, Gangas were dethroned from Bayalnad by Kadamba dynasty of North Canara. Wayanad, called Bayalnad (Kannada) since beginning, was at that time divided into two portions – Bira Bayalnad and Chagi Bayalnad. One of the Mysore inscriptions (alluding perhaps to the treacherous beauty of the country, which attracted the stranger and then laid him low with malaria) says "an adulteress with black waving curls, as adulteress with full-moon face, an adulteress with endless side-glances, an adulteress with adorned slim figure was this storeyed mansion, the double Bayalnad".

Kadamba Bayalnad rule emerged in the 11th century under the chief Raviyammarasa with Kirttipura, Punnad, as its capital. Kanthirava (1090 CE) was described as ruling Chagi-Bayalnad. Iravi-Challamma (1108 CE) was the ruler of Bira-Bayalnad.

=== The Western Chalukyas (Kalyani Chalukyas) ===
Under emperor Tailapa II (973–997 CE) many Jain Basthis were built in south India. The Jain centres and agricultural villages of Wayanad came in to existence during this time. There are many proofs, which justify the existence of Jainism in Wayanad.

=== The Hoysalas ===
In 1104 CE Vishnuvardhana of Hoysala invaded Bayalnad and Nilgiris and annexed them followed by Vijayanagara dynasty in the 14th century. A Kadamba king, Mukkanna-Kadamba ruled Bayal-nad in and around 1138 CE.

=== The Vijayanagara empire ===
A feudatory chieftain of Sangama dynasty of Vijaynagar, Immadi Kadamba Raya Vodeyayya of Bayalnad Kadambas, is said to have ruled Bayalnad.

=== The Mysore Wodeyars and the Sultans ===
In 1610 CE Udaiyar Raja Wadiyar of Mysore drove out Vijayanagara General and became the ruler of Bayalnad and the Nilgiris. Bayalnad is the present Wayanad.

An inscription discovered from a Jain Basti at Varadur near Panamaram dated to Saka era 1606 which is 1684 CE, shows that Jainism was still very powerful even in the 17th century. The inscription which was noticed by noted epigraphist and historian M. R. Raghava Varriar, has reference about the earliest Jain settlements and temples in Wayanad. The copper plate inscription which was placed under a water fountain at Varadur Ananthanatha Swami temple deals with the grant of various ritual materials to the Jain Basathis of Wayanad by Lalithappa, the younger son of Bommarasa of the Karkala Aremane Basathi.

The Kannada inscription dated Sakavarsha 1606 (i.e., 1684 CE) Rakthakshi Samvatsara Jeshtabahula Shukravara reads:Karkala aremane basthiya bommarasanu mommaga lalithappanu devapooje chinna belli thamra kanchu upakaranagalu madisi kotta bibara.

The Jain Chaithyalayas or temples referred in the inscription are Arepathra, Bennegodu, Palagondu, Hanneradubeedhi, Puthangadi (Muthangadi) and Hosangadi. The Arepathra Chaityalaya is not yet identified. It is believed that it was at the hilltop near to the Panamaram river. The other Kannada touch place names are identified with their present Malayalam version names as Venniyode, Palukunnu, Sultan Batheri, Puthangadi and Mananthavady respectively. Raghava Varriar says that there were seven Jain centres in Wayanad viz. Manikyapuri, Ksheerapuri, Kalpathi, Vennayode, Palagondu, Hosangadi and Hanneradubeedhi. It is believed that Manikyapuri was at the present day Manichira. The location of Ksheerapuri is not yet identified. Kalpathi may be Kalpetta, the present day Wayanad district headquarters, Anjukunnu was then Hanjugondu, etc.

When Wayanad was under Hyder Ali's rule, the ghat road from Vythiri to Thamarassery was constructed. Then the British rulers developed this route to Carter road. When Wayanad was under Tipu Sultan's rule British invasion started. Tussle and turbulent times followed. The British claimed Wayanad under the 1792 treaty of Srirangapatna citing it was part of Malabar. Tipu Sultan went in appeal before the governor general. Considering his arguments, relying on the successive Karnataka rule for centuries in Wayanad and its geographical detachment from Malabar, in 1798, Governor General Lord Mornington declared by proclamation that Wayanad had not been ceded to the East India Company by the treaty of 1792. Consequently, the British troops withdrew from Wayanad conceding to Tipu's rule.

=== Mysore Sultans ===
When Wayanad was under Hyder Ali's rule, the ghat road from Vythiri to Thamarassery was invented. Then the British rulers developed this route to Carter road. After Hyder Ali, his son Tipu Sultan took control over the territory.

=== Colonial era ===
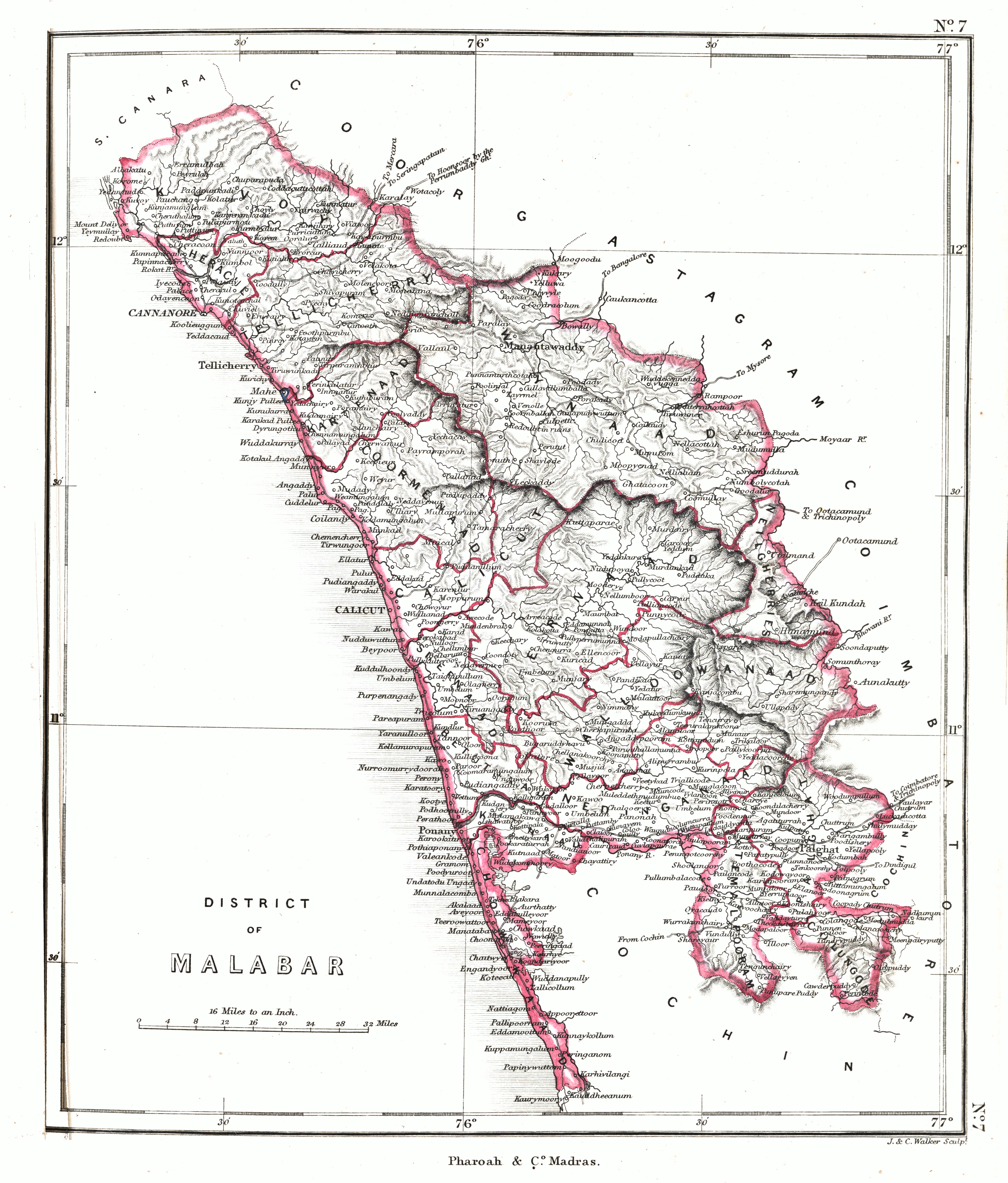
An old map of Malabar District (1854). Note that the taluks Pandalur, Gudalur, and Kundah in present-day Nilgiris district were parts of Wayanad Taluk in 1854. The Taluks of Malabar were rearranged in 1860 and 1877.

Initially the British had to suffer local resistance against their rule under the leadership of Kerala Varma Pazhassi Raja, who had popular support in Thalassery-Wayanad region. In the end, the British could get only the dead body of the Rajah, who killed himself somewhere in the interior of the forest. Thus, Wayanad fell into the hands of the British and with it came a new turn in the home of this area. The British authorities opened up the plateau to the cultivation of tea and other cash crops by constructing roads across the dangerous slopes of Wayanad, to Kozhikode and Thalassery. Later, they extended these new roads to the cities of Mysore and Ooty through Gudalur. Settlers emigrated from all parts of Kerala and the fecund lands proved a veritable goldmine with incredible yields of cash crops. Agriculture Cultivation started broadly after 1900 A.D onwards.

=== Post-Independence ===
Wayanad eventually became part of Kerala despite its geographical delimitations and political dissent in 1956 on State's reorganisation. Even now there is a considerable Kannada speaking population and the reminiscence of centuries old Karnataka rule is omnipresent in Wayanad. Agriculture Cultivation started broadly after 1900 A.D onwards. The British authorities opened up the plateau to cultivation of tea and other cash crops by constructing roads across the dangerous slopes of Wayanad, to Kozhikode and Thalassery. Later, they extended these new roads to the cities of Mysore and Ooty through Gudalur. Settlers emigrated from all parts of Kerala and the fecund lands proved a veritable goldmine with incredible yields of cash crops.

When the State of Kerala came into being in November 1956, Wayanad was part of Kannur district. Later, south Wayanad was added to Kozhikode district. To fulfil the aspirations of the people of Wayanad for development, North Wayanad and South Wayanad were carved out and joined to form the present district of Wayanad. This district came into being on 1 November 1980 as one of the twelve districts of Kerala, consisting of three taluks; Vythiri, Mananthavady, and Sulthan Bathery.

In 2024, landslides in Wayanad killed at least 336 people and 78 are missing. Many of the people killed were workers in the farms, or were members of their families.

== Geography ==
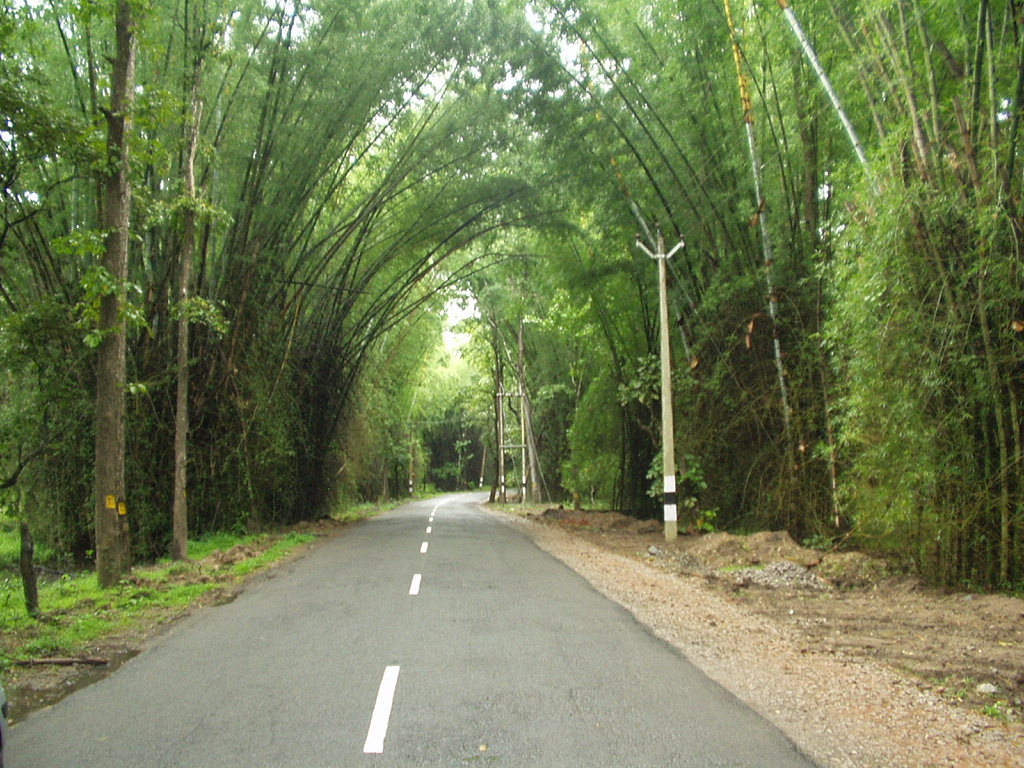
Wayanad scenery on NH 766 Kozhikode-Kollegal

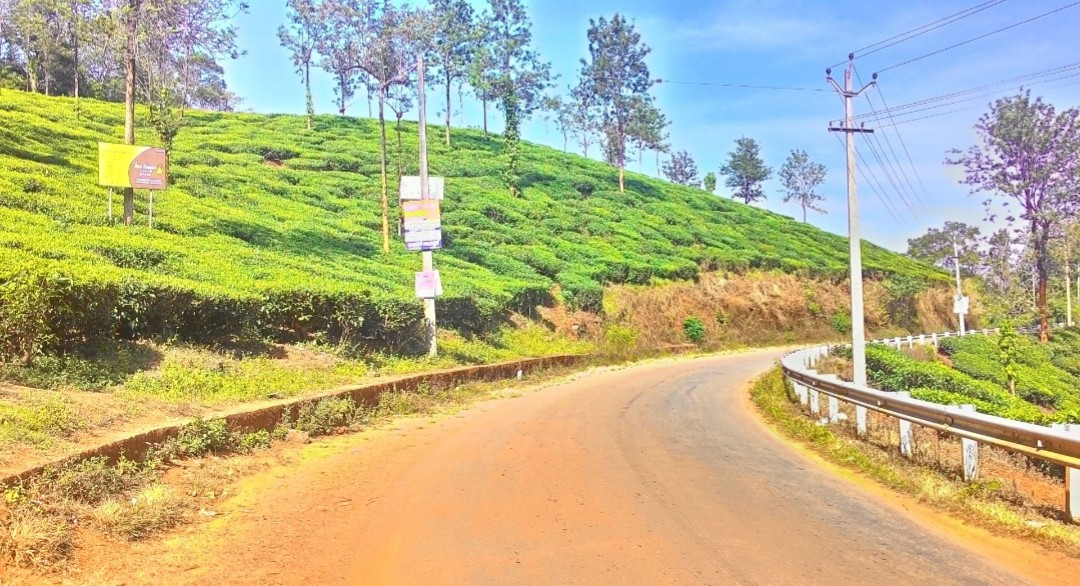
Pozhuthana

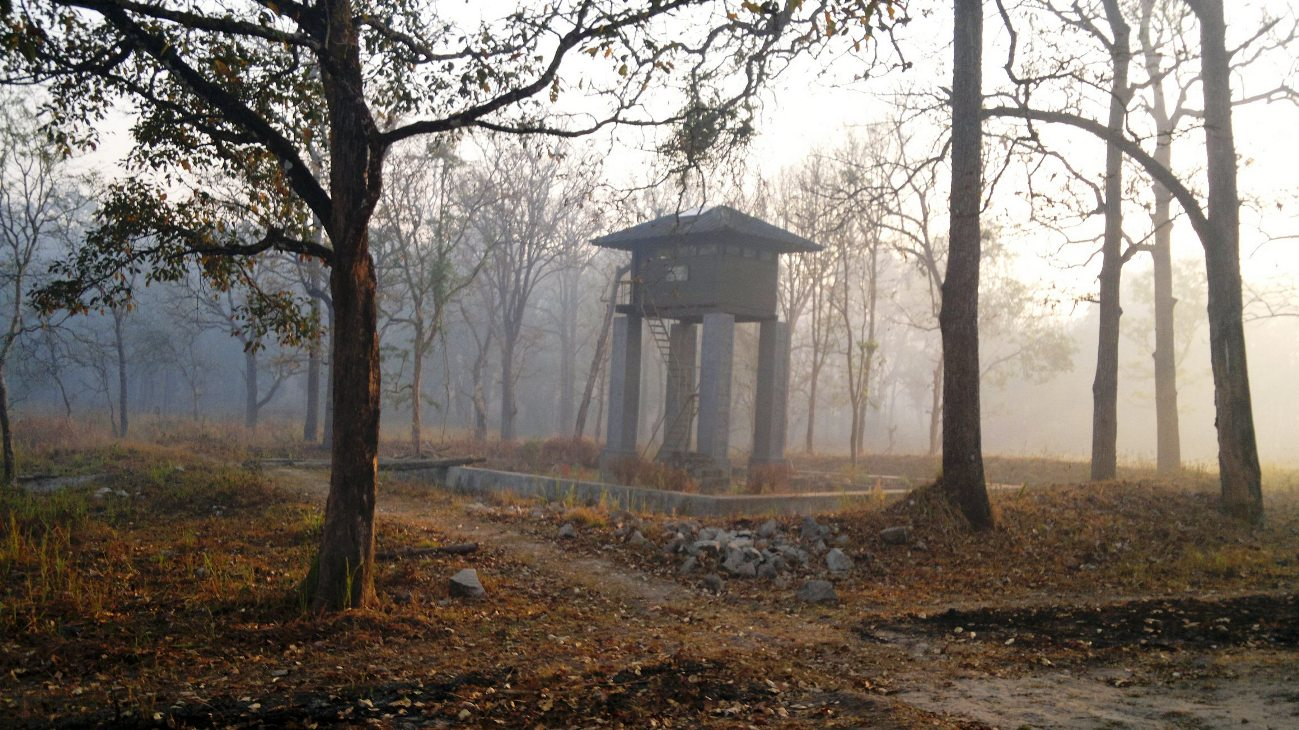
Wayanad Wildlife Sanctuary

Wayanad district stands on the southern tip of the Deccan Plateau and includes part of the Western Ghats. The western parts of the district bordering Kozhikode district consists of the Western Ghats covered with dense forest. The district forms a part of the south western Deccan Plateau, and is sloped to the east. Quite a large area of the district is covered by forest but the continued and indiscriminate exploitation of the natural resources point towards an imminent environmental crisis. There are a lot of trekking points in this district. Chembra Peak (2,100m) is the highest peak in the Wayanad district. Banasura Hill (2,079m) in Padinjarathara is also similar to height of Chembra Hill. Brahmagiri Hill is also another trekking point in Wayanad.

Wayanad district is bounded by protected area network of different biological reserves such as Malabar Wildlife Sanctuary in the West, Mudumalai National Park in the South, Bandipur National Park in the East, Nagarhole National Park in the North East, Brahmagiri Wildlife Sanctuary in the North and Aralam Wildlife Sanctuary in North West which is linked with Wayanad Wildlife Sanctuary.

The district has rich water resources. There are east flowing and west flowing rivers in the region. One of the major rivers in the district is Kabini River, a tributary of River Kaveri; it is also one of the only three east flowing rivers in Kerala. Kabani has many tributaries including Thirunelli River, Panamaram River and Mananthavady River. All these rivulets help form a rich water resource as well as a distinct landscape for the district. Various streams flow into the Panamaram rivulet while it passes through the mountain gorges and finally the river falls down into Panamaram Valley. After flowing through the district for a certain distance, River Panamaram joins Mananthavady River, which originates from the lower regions of the peak called 'Thondarmudi'.

=== Banasura Sagar Dam ===
Banasura Sagar Dam in Padinjarathara across the Karamanathodu River, a tributary of River Kabini, m, is considered to be the largest earth dam in India and the second largest in Asia. The dam is ideally placed in the foothills of Banasura hills, which got its name from 'Banasura', the son of King Mahabali, the famous ruler of Kerala. The dam here was constructed on behalf of the Banasurasagar project in 1979, to support the Kakkayam Hydroelectric power project and to meet the water demand for irrigation and drinking purposes. The dam, located around 2 km away from Padinjarathara is a tourist destination in Wayanad. Banasura dam is made up of massive stacks of stones and boulders.

=== Karapuzha Dam ===
Karapuzha Dam has been constructed on the Karapuzha River, a tributary of the Kabini River. Vazhavatta in Vythiri taluk of Wynad district for providing irrigation to an area of 5580 ha (CCA) say 5600 hectare in Vythiri and Sultan Bathery taluks of Wynad district of Kerala. The reservoir has a gross storage capacity of 76.50 M Cum and live storage capacity of 72.00 M Cum.

=== Flora and fauna ===
The soil and climate of Wayanad are suitable for horticulture on a commercial basis. For promoting the cultivation of vegetables and establishing orchards, the Kerala Agricultural University is running a regional Agricultural Research Station at Ambalavayal.

Elephant, bear and other wild animals from the neighbouring wild life sanctuaries of Karnataka and Tamil Nadu, stray into the Begur forest range and the forests around Muthanga, which is 20 kilometres away from the town of Sultan Bathery.

Franky's narrow-mouthed frog was recently discovered in Wayanad district. The Wayanad laughingthrush is named after this region, but unlike other South Indian laughingthrushes, has a wide distribution through the Western Ghats.

== Demographics ==
Historical population
| Year | Pop. | ±% p.a. |
|---|---|---|
| 1901 | 75,149 | — |
| 1911 | 82,549 | +0.94% |
| 1921 | 84,771 | +0.27% |
| 1931 | 91,769 | +0.80% |
| 1941 | 106,350 | +1.49% |
| 1951 | 169,280 | +4.76% |
| 1961 | 275,255 | +4.98% |
| 1971 | 413,850 | +4.16% |
| 1981 | 554,026 | +2.96% |
| 1991 | 672,128 | +1.95% |
| 2001 | 780,619 | +1.51% |
| 2011 | 817,420 | +0.46% |

Religions in Wayanad district (2011)
| Religion | Percent |
| Hinduism | 49.48% |
| Islam | 28.65% |
| Christianity | 21.34% |
| Other or not stated | 0.53% |

Religions in Wayanad
| Talukas | Hindus | Christians | Muslims |
|---|---|---|---|
| Mananthavady | 46.31 | 23.6 | 29.52 |
| Vythiri(Kalpetta) | 42.69 | 15.34 | 41.36 |
| Sulthan Bathery | 58.19 | 24.65 | 16.74 |

It is the least populous district in Kerala. Unlike the other districts of Kerala, in Wayanad district, there is no town or village named same as the district (i.e., there is no "Wayanad town").

Wayanad has a majority Hindu population with Thiyya, Nair and various Tribes. Muslims constitute the second largest group, followed by a significant Christian population.Syrian Christians, Migarted From Central Travancore As Part of Malabar Migration forms the dominat part, and wayanad have the highest proportion of christians in Malabar district.

According to the 2018 Statistics Report, Wayanad district had a population of 846,637, roughly equal to the nation of Comoros. 2011 Census of India gives district a ranking of 482nd in India (out of a total of 640). The district has a population density of 397 inhabitants per square kilometre (1,030/sq mi). 3.86% of the population lives in urban areas. Scheduled Castes and Scheduled Tribes make up 3.87% and 18.86% of the population respectively. This is the highest SC/ST percentage in all of Kerala.

Paniyas, Uraali Kurumas, and Kurichiyans comprise the tribes in Wayanad.

Languages of Wayanad district (2011)
1. Malayalam (93.9%)
2. Paniya (1.89%)
3. Tamil (1.14%)
4. Kannada (0.94%)
5. Others (2.13%)

At the time of the 2011 census, 93.88% of the population spoke Malayalam, 1.89% Paniya, 1.14% Tamil and 0.94% Kannada as their first language.

=== Tribes in Wayanad ===
The Wayanad have the largest tribal population in Kerala with 8 scheduled tribes including Adiyan, Paniyan, Mullukkurman, Kurichyan, Vettakkuruman, Wayanad Kadar, Kattuniakkan and Thachaanadan Mooppan. These communities have a number of symbolic oral narratives

Adiyan: Adiyans are a matrilineal Tribal group, who were treated as bonded slave labourers by the landlords up to 1976. Now the majority of them are agricultural labourers and some of them are marginal agriculturalist. They spoke Adiya language as their mother tongue.

Kattuniakkan: A particularly Vulnerable Tribal group of Wayanad. Jenu Kurumban and Ten Kurumban are the synonyms used for the Kattunayakan community. They spoke Kattunaikka language a dialect of Kannada and Malayalam. They are patrilineal and a forest dwelling, hunting and gathering community. This is the largest population among PVTG in Kerala with a total population of 19995 (Male- 9953, Female-10042)

Kurichyan: They are the second largest community among Scheduled Tribes with a total population of 35909 (Male- 18129, Female-17780).

Mullukkurman: A patrilineal and patrilocal tribal agriculturalist community found in Wayanad. The community members are expert in hunting and their spoken language is Mullukkuruma language. The total population is 21375 (Male- 10625, female-10750).

Paniyan: A patrilineal slave tribe community until the 1976 Bonded Labour (Abolition) Act, distributed in Wayanad, Kannur, Kozhikode and Malappuram. They are the largest single tribal community with a population of 92787 (Male-45112, female- 47675). Their language is a dialect known as Paniya Language and nowadays they are agricultural labourers.

Thachaanadan Mooppan: Thachaanadan Mooppan is a matrilineal community. In earlier days they were shifting cultivators and hunters. Nowadays they earn through agricultural labour work. Known for their expertise in carpentry and basket making, their total population is 1649, and consists of 814 males and 835 females.

Vettakkuruman: Vettakkuruman also a patrilineal tribal community. Their language is known as Bettakkuruma language. The population of Vettakuruman is 6482 consisting of 3193 males and 3289 females.

Wayanad Kadar: They are found in Kozhikkode and Wayanad district and entirely a different generic stock from Kaders of Cochin. They are matrilineal marginal tribes with a population of 673, consisting of 348 males and 325 females.

== Government and politics ==
=== Administration ===
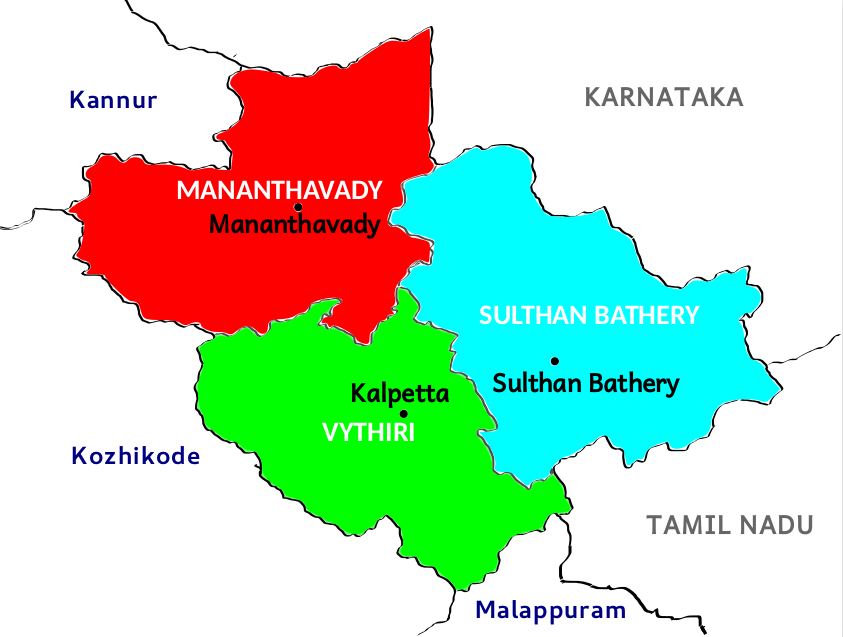
Taluks of Wayanad District

Local bodies in Wayanad District

- District Headquarters: Kalpetta. District Collector, District Police Chief and District Judge are based at Kalpetta.
- 3

==== Revenue administration ====
District administration, Collectorate, is headquartered at Kalpetta. The district administration is headed by a District Collector, who is an Indian Administrative Service officer. For the purpose of revenue administration, Wayanad district is divided into revenue divisions, taluks, and revenue villages. The Revenue Divisional Office is at Mananthavady, which is headed by a Sub Collector or Revenue Divisional Officer (RDO), who is also the Sub-divisional magistrate. There are 3 taluks in total: Mananthavady, Vythiri, and Sulthan Bathery. Each taluk office is headed by a Tehsildar, who is also the executive magistrate of that taluk. These three taluks contain 49 revenue villages under their jurisdiction. These revenue villages is further divided into amsoms and desams for revenue purpose.

==== Police administration ====
Wayanad District Police falls under Kannur Range which comes under North Zone.

The Wayanad district police is headquartered in Kalpetta. It is headed by a District Police Chief (DPC), an IPS officer of the Kerala cadre, holding the rank of Superintendent of Police (SP). For the maintenance of law and order, the Wayanad police district is divided into 3 police subdivisions: Kalpetta, Mananthavady, and Sultan Bathery, with 17 police stations in total. Each subdivision is headed by a Deputy Superintendent of Police (DYSP) and consists of several police stations under its jurisdiction. Each police station is headed by an Inspector of Police or sub-inspector designated as the station house officer (SHO).

Other special units/cells include the District Special Branch, District Crime Branch, District Crime Records Bureau, and Narcotic Cell, each headed by a Deputy Superintendent of Police (Dy.SP).

==== Judiciary ====
The Kalpetta Judicial District was established on 15 December 1984, following the formation of the Wayanad District on 1 November 1980. Kalpatta judicial district is headed by a Principal District and Sessions Judge and consists the following courts under its jurisdiction;

Court complex Kalpatta:

- District and Sessions Court, Kalpatta
- Additional District and Sessions Court, Kalpatta
- Additional District and Sessions Court & Motor Accident Claims Tribunal, Kalpatta
- Family Court, Kalpatta
- Fast Track Special Court, Kalpatta
- Chief Judicial Magistrate Court, Kalpatta
- Judicial first class magistrate court, Kalpatta
- Munsiff court, Kalpatta

Court complex Mananthavady:

- Judicial First Class Magistrate Court, Mananthavady
- Judicial First Class Magistrate Court II, Mananthavady
- SC/ST Special Court, Mananthavady

Court complex, Sulthan Bathery:

- Munsiff magistrate court, Mananthavady
- Sub-court, Sulthan Bathery
- Judicial First Class Magistrate-I
- Judicial First Class Magistrate-II

=== Local self-governments ===
==== Panchayats ====
For the purpose of rural governance, the Wayanad District Panchayat functions at the district level, headquartered in Kalpatta. Wayanad district panchayat is governed by elected council, headed by president and vice-president. The district panchayat consists of 16 divisions, each represented by an elected member. The district panchayat is at the helm for the development of rural areas in the district.

There are 4 Block Panchayats for block-level governance and 23 Gram Panchayats for village or group-of-village-level governance. These panchayats are governed by elected councils, headed by presidents and vice-presidents respectively. The block panchayats/block development offices are Kalpatta, Mananthavady, Panamaram, Sulthan Bathery.

==== Municipalities ====
For urban governance, there are three municipalities for the major towns: Kalpetta, Mananthavady, and Sultan Bathery. These municipalities are governed by the elected municipal councils, headed by a chairperson and vice chairperson.

=== Electoral constituencies ===
==== State Assembly Constituencies ====
| District | No. | Constituency | Name | Party | Alliance | Remarks |
|---|---|---|---|---|---|---|
| Wayanad | 17 | Mananthavady (ST) | O. R. Kelu | CPI(M) | LDF | |
| Wayanad | 18 | Sulthan Bathery (ST) | I. C. Balakrishnan | INC | UDF | |
| Wayanad | 19 | Kalpetta | T Siddique | INC | UDF | |

==== Parliamentary Representation ====
Wayanad Lok Sabha constituency MP is Priyanka Gandhi Vadra. T Siddique is the MLA from Kalpetta (State Assembly constituency), elected in the 2021 Kerala Legislative Assembly election. Sulthan Bathery (State Assembly constituency) is represented by I. C. Balakrishnan. Mananthavady (State Assembly constituency) is represented by O. R. Kelu.

Member of Parliament (MP)
| | Portrait | Name | Constituency | Party | Alliance |
|---|---|---|---|---|---|
| 1 | | Priyanka Gandhi Vadra | Wayanad | INC | UDF |

== Major towns ==
| Mananthavady; Thirunelli; Thavinjal; Thondernadu; Panamaram | Mananthavady taluk |
| Vythiri; Kalpetta; Padinjarathara; Meppadi; Pozhuthana; Muttil; Muppainad | Vythiri taluk |
| Meenangadi; Ambalavayal; Sultan Bathery; Muthanga; Pulpally | Sulthan Bathery taluk |

== Tourism ==
The District has more than 20 destinations. District Tourism Promotion Councils (DTPC) of Wayanad that functions under the Department of Tourism, Government of Kerala is responsible for all tourism related activities in the district.

Wayanad is home to the Wayanad Literature Festival, the largest rurally held literature festival in India. It sees a host of authors, journalists and activists in each edition, drawing people in from across the country.

== Transport ==
The Kozhikode–Kollegal National Highway 766 (formerly NH 212) passes through Wayanad district. En route to Mysore on NH 212, past Wayanad district boundary, which is also the Kerala state boundary, NH 766 passes through Bandipur National Park. The nearest airport to Wayanad is Kannur International Airport, which is located about 82 km away.

== Notable people ==
- M. P. Veerendra Kumar – Politician
- C. K. Saseendran – Politician
- Sunny Wayne – Actor
- Fr.Mathai Nooranal – Priest
- Philoxenos Yuhanon – Bishop
- George Njaralakatt – Bishop
- Mathews Mor Aphrem Metropolitan – Bishop
- Abu Salim – Actor
- Anu Sithara – Actress
- Midhun Manuel Thomas – Director
- Basil Joseph – Director
- Jayanthi Rajan - Politician
- Jenith Kachappilly – Director
- K. P. Thomas (artist) - Artist
- Manu Manjith – Lyricist
- P. S. Jeena – Basketball player
- Sreedhanya Suresh – Indian Administrative Service officer
- Vinod Jose – Journalist
- Nanditha K. S. – Poet
- Nirmal Baby Varghese – Director
- Kalpatta Narayanan –Novelist
- O. R. Kelu – Politician
- Esther Anil – Actress
- Amalda Liz - Actress
- Minnu Mani - Cricketer
- Sajeevan Sajana - Cricketer

== See also ==
- Marakkadavu
- Perumpadikkunnu
- List of religious sites in Wayanad
- Keralathile Africa
- 2024 Wayanad landslides
