= Perumpadikkunnu =

Village in Kerala, India

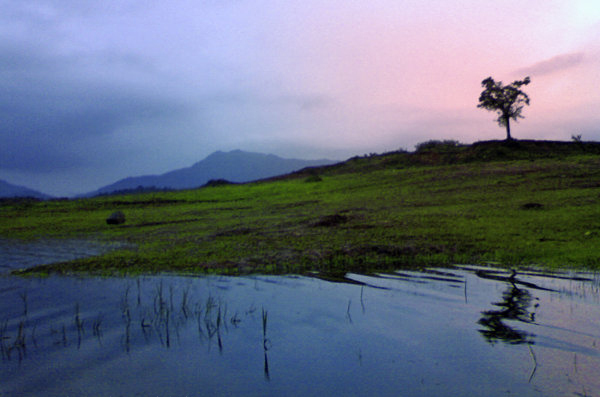
Karappuzha

Perumpadikkunnu is a place situated in Wayanad Ambalavayal, Kerala, India. It is 12 km from Ambalavayal. Karappuzha lake's a part is on perumpadikkunnu. The ward member in Perumpadikkunnu is now Mohanan. There is a school named St. Mary's LP School Munnoor. A famous club was situated in Perumpadikkunnu named 'Yuvarasmi' .

== Transportation ==
Perumpadikunnu can be accessed from Sultan Battery. The Periya ghat road connects Mananthavady to Kannur and Thalassery. The Thamarassery mountain road connects Calicut with Kalpetta. The Kuttiady mountain road connects Vatakara with Kalpetta and Mananthavady. The Palchuram mountain road connects Kannur and Iritty with Mananthavady. The road from Nilambur to Ooty is also connected to Wayanad through the village of Meppadi.

The nearest railway station is at Mysore and the nearest airports are Kozhikode International Airport-120 km, Bengaluru International Airport-290 km, and Kannur International Airport, 58 km.
