= Caste on the Menu Card =

- Directed by: Anurup Khillare, Atul Anand, Vaseem Chaudhary, Reetika Revathy Subramanian and Ananyaa Gaur
- Production company: Tata Institute of Social Sciences (TISS)
- Release date: 3 January 2015
- Running time: 21 minutes
- Country: India
- Language: English

Caste on the Menu Card is a 21-minute documentary film made by students of the School of Media and Cultural Studies at the Tata Institute of Social Sciences (TISS), focusing on beef-eating practices in Mumbai, India. It portrays the prevalence of caste differentiation in food choices of people in Mumbai, how it causes exclusion, and touches upon concerns related to livelihood, social inclusion and human rights.

== Controversies ==
In 2015, the film was the only one of 35 whose planned showing at the 12th Jeevika Asia Livelihood Documentary Festival was cancelled. The organisers had approached the Ministry of Information and Broadcasting to obtain permission to show it but this was not forthcoming because the Ministry said that they had failed to provide the required details about it.

Following this incident, the film-makers then arranged to screen their film independently at Jawaharlal Nehru University, for which permission was obtained from a university hostel warden by the Birsa Ambedkar Phule Students' Association (BAPSA). That permission was subsequently revoked at short notice, with the warden saying that BAPSA had wanted to move the screening to an outside area over which he had no jurisdiction. BAPSA alleged that the warden had acted under outside political pressure. BAPSA defied the revocation and screened the film anyway.

It was declared that the documentary would be screened by the organisers at the fourth edition of Nainital Film Festival.

== Production ==
The directors were Anurup Khillare, Atul Anand, Vaseem Chaudhary, Reetika Revathy Subramanian and Ananyaa Gaur.
