= Anjali Monteiro =

Indian Documentory film director

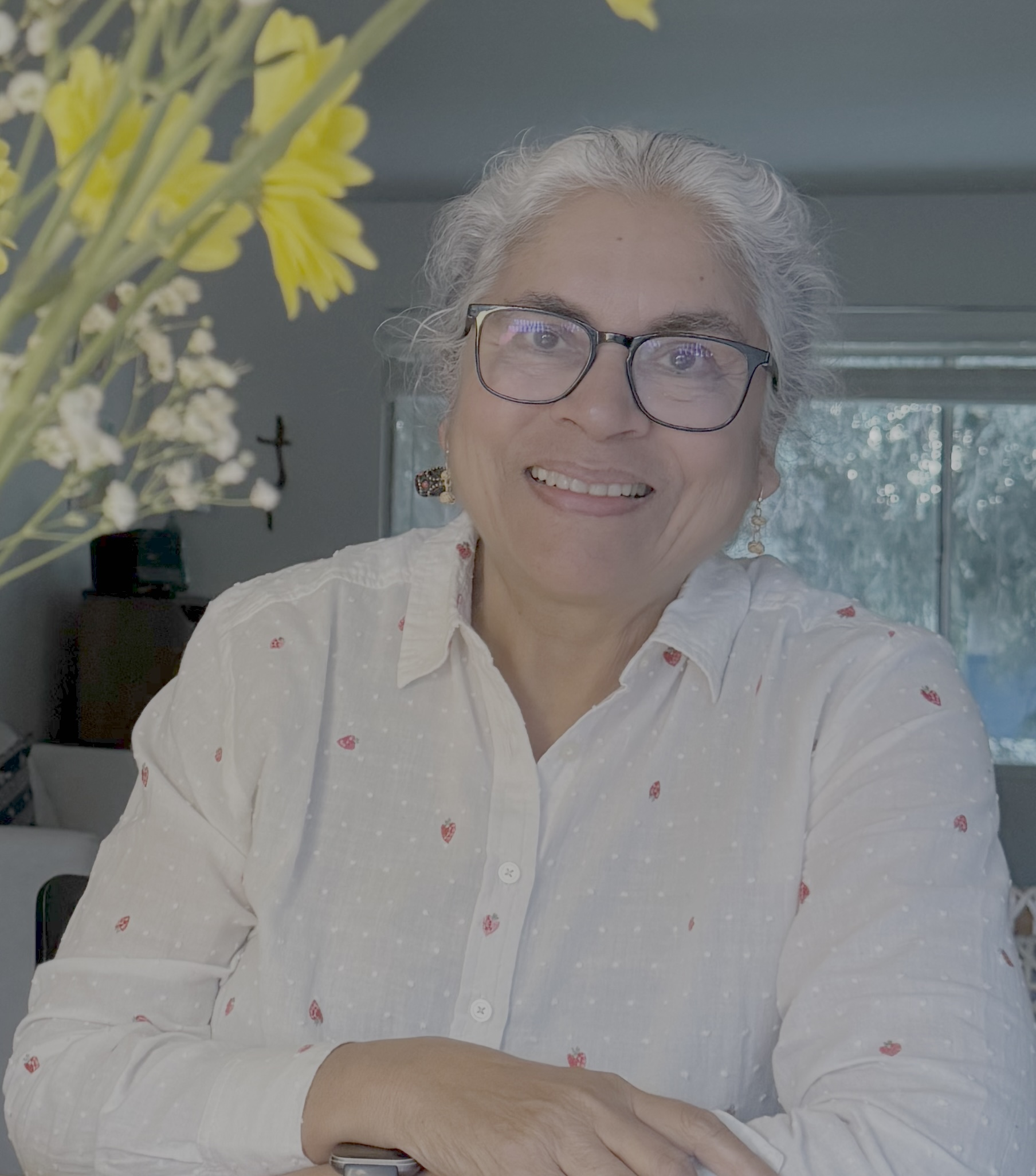
- Anjali Monteiro
- Born: Mumbai, Maharashtra
- Education: Centre for the Study of Developing Societies, Goa University, Sophia College for Women, Gokhale Institute of Politics and Economics
- Occupations: Filmmaker, Educator, Curator
- Years active: 1990 – present
- Spouse: K.P. Jayasankar
- Website: www.monteiro-jayasankar.com

Anjali Monteiro is a documentary filmmaker, media educator and researcher who lives in Goa. She retired as Professor and Dean from the School of Media and Cultural Studies, Tata Institute of Social Sciences, Mumbai. Jointly with K.P. Jayasankar, she has made around thirty-five documentary films on various subjects.

== Biography ==
Anjali Monteiro was born in Pune, Maharashtra (on July 13). Her parents were Inocencio Gracias Monteiro, an army engineer and Sofia Cordeiro Monteiro, a school teacher, both from Goa. She completed her bachelor's degree in Psychology from Sophia College for Women, Bombay University in 1975 and her master's degree in Economics from Gokhale Institute of Politics and Economics, Pune University in 1977. She completed her Ph.D. in Sociology from Goa University and the Centre for the Study of Developing Societies, under the guidance of noted scholar Professor Ashis Nandy in 1994. She taught at the undergraduate level and then was involved in development communication work between 1979 and 1983 at the Xavier Institute of Communications, Mumbai. She married her colleague K.P. Jayasankar in 1989 and they have a daughter.

== Teaching ==
Monteiro joined the Tata Institute of Social Sciences in 1983 and set up the Audio-Visual Unit, which is now the School of Media and Cultural Studies. Monteiro has been a visiting faculty at several media and design schools and Universities, in India and overseas, including University of California, Berkeley, University of Technology, Sydney, and Lahti Institute of Design, Finland, among others.

In 2007, Monteiro and Jayasankar were involved in setting up the MA in Media and Cultural Studies at the Tata Institute of Social Sciences, Mumbai. This two-year programme combines media and cultural theory and practice in innovative ways. They have mentored and guided over 100 student and fellow documentary film projects.

In recognition of their contribution to teaching, the National Institute of Design awarded them jointly with the Professor Satish Bahadur Lifetime Achievement Award for Outstanding Contribution to Film Education in 2022. Post-retirement, they continue to teach young people the art of documentary filmmaking.

== Research ==
Monteiro's doctoral work, entitled State, Subject and the Text: The Construction of Meaning in Television, supervised by Prof. Ashis Nandy, involved an ethnographic study of television audience reception in a working-class neighbourhood in Goa, in the late 1980s. She currently writes in the broad area of media and cultural studies, with focus on documentary film, censorship, critical theory and issues of media representation.

== Selected filmography ==
(Co-directed with K.P. Jayasankar)

Year	Title	Length
2025	State of Hope	65 minutes
2017	A Delicate Weave	62 minutes
2012	Farooq vs The State	25 minutes
2011	So Heddan So Hoddan	60 minutes
2009	Do Din ka Mela (A Two Day Fair)	60 minutes
2007	Our Family	56 minutes
2005	She Write	55 minutes
2003	Naata: The Bond	45 minutes
2001	Saacha (The Loom)	49 minutes
1997	YCP 1997	43 minutes
1995	Kahankar : Ahankar (Story Maker : Story Taker	38 minutes
1994	Identity: The Construction of Selfhood	20 minutes
1993	Odhni: A Collective Exploration Of Ourselves, Our Bodies	23 minutes
1992	One Hundred Years Of Drought	21 minutes
1991	From the Diary of a Genetic Counsellor	30 minutes

== Selected publications ==
- 2024 Anjali Monteiro and K.P. Jayasankar, Singing in Saffron Times: Documentary Film and Resistance to Majoritarian Politics in India, in Menon D. and Amir Taha (eds) Cinemas of the Global South: Towards a Southern Aesthetics, Routledge.
- 2024 Anjali Monteiro and K.P. Jayasankar, "Threadbearing": Journeys with our Subjects and our Documentary Narratives, in Kishore S. and Kunal Ray (eds) Resistance in Indian Documentary Film: Aesthetics, Culture and Practice, Edinburgh University Press.
- 2022 Anjali Monteiro and K.P. Jayasankar, Learning and Unlearning Through the Pandemic, in Worth D. (ed) Good News, Bad News, Who Can Tell?: The Pandemic Reveals Wisdom, Archway Publishing.
- 2021 Anjali Monteiro and K.P. Jayasankar, A Delicate Weave: The Place of Local Wisdoms in Community Media Initiatives, in Ullah, F. et al (eds) Many Voices, Many Worlds: Critical Perspectives on Community Media in India, Sage.
- 2021 Faiz Ullah, Anjali Monteiro and K.P. Jayasankar (co-editors), Many Voices, Many Worlds: Critical Perspectives on Community Media in India, Sage.
- 2020 Anjali Monteiro, K.P. Jayasankar and Amit Rai, DigiNaka: Subaltern Politics and Digital Media in Post-Capitalist India, Orient Blackswan.
- 2018 Faiz Ullah, Anjali Monteiro and K.P. Jayasankar, DiverCity- Independent Documentary as an Alternate Narrative of the City, in Devasundaram, A.E. (ed) Indian Cinema Beyond Bollywood: The New Independent Cinema Revolution, Routledge
- 2016 K.P. Jayasankar and Anjali Monteiro, A Fly in The Curry: Independent Documentary in India, Sage, 2016. Won Special Mention 64th National Film Awards Golden Lotus Award for best book on cinema category.
- 2012 Anjali Monteiro and K.P. Jayasankar, Resisting Censorship in India, East Asia Forum Quarterly, Vol 4, No. 1.
- 2010 Anjali Monteiro K.P. Jayasankar, A New Pair of Scissors- the Draft Cinematograph Bill, Economic and Political Weekly, July 17, 2010
- 2009 K.P. Jayasankar and Anjali Monteiro, Jai Ho Shanghai: The Invisible Poor in Slumdog Millionaire, in Kaldor, Mary et al. (eds) Global Civil Society Yearbook of the London School of Economics, Sage, London
- 2005 K.P. Jayasankar and Anjali Monteiro, Censorship ke Peeche Kya Hai, in Nalini Rajan (ed) Practising Journalism, Sage, London
- 2003 K.P. Jayasankar and Anjali Monteiro, The Plot Thickens – A Cultural Studies Approach to Media Education in India, in Tony Lavender, Birgitte Tufte and Dafna Lemish (eds.) Global Trends in Media Education, Hampton Press.
- 2001 K.P. Jayasankar and Anjali Monteiro, Documentary and Ethnographic Film, Elsevier Encyclopaedia of Social and Behavioural Sciences, Elsevier.
- 2000 K.P. Jayasankar and Anjali Monteiro, Between the Normal and the Imaginary – The Spectator-self, the Other and Satellite Television in India, in Hagen, I and Wasko, J.(eds) Consuming Audiences: Production and Reception in Media Research, Hampton Press.
- 1998 Anjali Monteiro, Official Television and Unofficial Fabrications of the Self: The Spectator as Subject in Nandy, Ashis (ed.), The Secret Politics of Our Desires, OUP.
- 1993 K.P. Jayasankar and Anjali Monteiro, The Spectator-Indian – An Exploratory Study of the Reception of News, Cultural Studies 10 (1).

== Awards and recognitions ==
2019

- "A Delicate Weave" received the Jury's commendation, Intangible culture film prize, 16th Royal Anthropological Institute Festival at Bristol, UK

2018

- "Saacha (The Loom)" featured at Kochi-Muziris Biennale

2016

- Special Mention in the President's National Awards (2017) for best book on cinema category for "A Fly in the Curry" (Sage 2016)

2013

- "Saacha (The Loom)" was part of the installation "Project Space: Word. Sound. Power." at Tate Modern, London
- "So Heddan So Hoddan" won the Basil Wright Award at RAI International Ethnographic Film Festival in Edinburgh

2011

- Commendation of the Jury, Intangible Culture Film Prize, RAI International Ethnographic Film Festival for "Do Din ka Mela"

2008

- Certificate of Merit and Special Mention of the Jury at Mumbai International Film Festival for "Our Family"
- Special Mention of the Jury, Signs 2007 for "Our Family"
- Indian Documentary Producers Association (IDPA) Gold for Best Sound Design, Gold for Best Script, Silver for Editing, Certificate of Merit for Best Documentary for "Our Family"

2005

- Best Documentary Prize, IV Three Continents International Documentary Festival, Venezuela for "SheWrite"
- Indian Documentary Producers Association Awards: First Technical Award for Sound Design and Second Technical Award for Cinematography for "SheWrite"

1998

- Certificate of Merit, Mumbai International Film Festival for "YCP1997"
- Jury's Award for Best Innovation, Astra Festival of Anthropological Documentary Film, Sibiu, Romania for "YCP1997"

1996

- Jury's Special Mention, Mumbai International Film Festival

1995

- Asia Prize, Prix Futura Berlin for "Identity: The Construction of Selfhood"
