= Karinthandan =

Legendary figure in Kerala, India

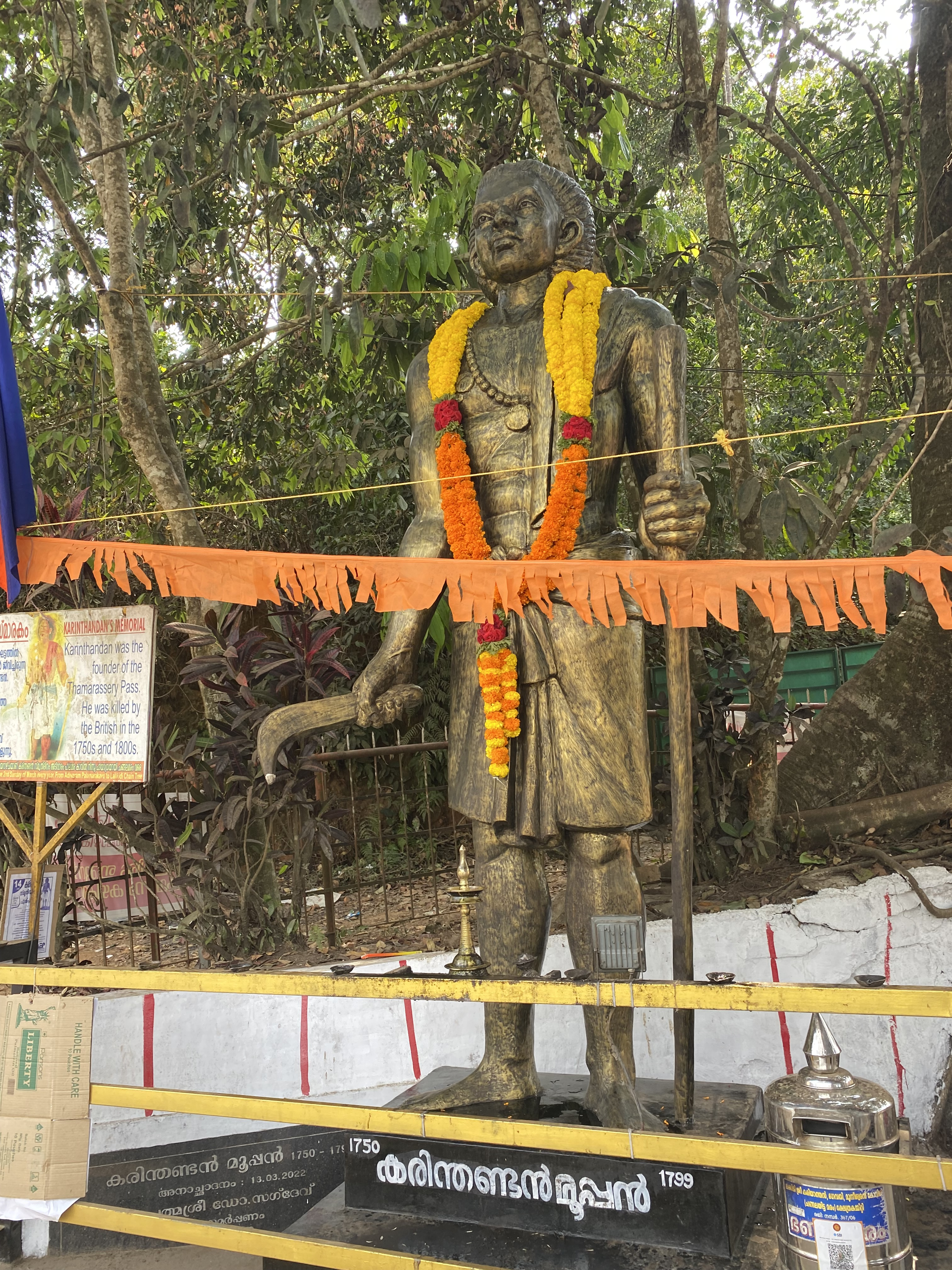
Karinthandan statue at Lakkidi

Karinthandan is a legendary figure in the history of Wayanad, a district in the Indian state of Kerala. He is revered as a tribal chieftain who sacrificed his life to protect his people and their land. tris.

== Legend ==
According to the local legend, Karinthandan was a member of the Paniya tribe, which was known for its deep knowledge of the forests and the mountains of Wayanad. When the British East India Company began its colonial expansion into the region in the 17th century, they sent a team of engineers to survey the area for a road construction.

As the team made its way through the dense forests and steep mountains of Wayanad, they relied heavily on the guidance of Karinthandan and his tribe. The Paniya people were skilled hunters and gatherers who knew the land well. They led the team through treacherous terrain, and eventually, they reached the summit of the Churam mountain pass, which connects Wayanad to the neighboring district of Kozhikode.

It was at this point that the legend takes a tragic turn. According to local folklore, the Britishers, eager to take credit for discovering the pass, pushed Karinthandan off the cliff to his death. The Paniya people were devastated by the loss of their leader, who they regarded as a hero and protector of their land.

== Legacy ==
The legend of Karinthandan has been passed down through generations and is still an important part of the cultural heritage of Wayanad. The Paniya people continue to tell the story of their hero, and many consider him a martyr who gave his life to protect his people and their land. The story of Karinthandan also reflects the complex relationship between the indigenous tribes of Wayanad and the colonial powers that sought to control the region.

In recent years, there have been efforts to preserve the memory of Karinthandan and Recognize his contribution to the history of Wayanad. In 2015, the Kerala government announced plans to build a statue of Karinthandan at the Churam pass to honor his memory. The project has been controversial, with some activists and tribal leaders arguing that the statue would be a form of cultural appropriation and would disrespect the memory of Karinthandan.

=== Chain tree ===
As Karinthandan lay dying, he placed a curse on the forest and the mountain pass, saying that no one who betrayed another in the region would ever find their way back home. Legend has it that Karinthandan's spirit remained in the forest, and his soul was trapped in a nearby fig tree, which later became known as the Wayanad Chain Tree.

The tree is named after the chains that are wrapped around it, which are said to have been placed there by a British engineer who got lost in the forest and was unable to find his way out until a local tribal elder led him to the tree. The elder explained the legend of Karinthandan and the curse, and told the engineers that the only way to lift the curse was to perform a ritual by tying a chain around the tree three times and making a wish.

Today, the Wayanad Chain Tree is a popular tourist attraction. Visitors come from all over the world to see the tree and learn about the legend of Karinthandan. The tree is located in a forested area and there are several trails and viewpoints nearby that offer views of the surrounding mountains and valleys.

=== In popular culture ===
Karinthandan's story has been passed down through generations as part of the folklore and cultural heritage of the Wayanad region of Kerala, and has therefore been featured in various forms of popular culture.

One example is the Malayalam novel Karinthandan by Sanal Krishnan, which was published in 2021. The novel tells the story of Karinthandan and explores his thoughts, emotions, and motivations as he guides British engineers through the forests of Wayanad. In addition to literature, Karinthandan's story has also been featured in local art forms such as theatre, dance, movie, and music.
