= Papa II =

Defunct military interrogation centre in Jammu and Kashmir, India

Papa II was an interrogation centre in the Indian state of Jammu and Kashmir, operated by the Border Security Force (BSF) from the start of the Kashmir insurgency in 1989 until it was shut down in 1996.

== Background ==
Every security force operating in Kashmir had its own interrogation centres in the state which included temporary detention centres at Border Security Force (BSF), Central Reserve Police Force (CRPF) and army camps. Detainees were first interrogated by the detaining security force for a period of time which ranged from several hours to several weeks. During this time no person was allowed to meet the detainee and the detainee was not produced before the court. Detainees suspected of being militants were handed over to Counter-Intelligence Kashmir (CIK) and are interrogated at Joint Interrogation Centres (JICs) where detention sometimes lasted for months. Papa II was one of several such centres in Kashmir.

Lawyers in Kashmir told Asia Watch in 1993 that they had filed approximately 15,000 petitions since 1990 calling the state authorities to reveal the situation of the detainees and the charges against them, but the authorities had not responded.

== Operation of Papa II ==
The building, of colonial origin, was initially a government guest house to accommodate visiting bureaucrats, in "serene surroundings" - the exclusive Gupkar Road on the banks of the Dal Lake in Srinagar. On takeover by the paramilitary Border Security Force in 1989, it was named Papa II "in an attempt to keep the compound's new purpose nominally confidential".

A May 1996 report by Human Rights Watch detailed allegations of abuse and torture at Papa II. According to William Dalrymple, Papa II was a centre into which

...large numbers of local people, as well as the occasional captured foreign jihadi, would "disappear." Their bodies would later be found, if at all, floating down rivers, bruised, covered in cigarette burns, missing fingers or even whole limbs.

A method of interrogation by which bodies of suspects were placed under heavy rollers caused at least 250 deaths through acute renal failure at one Srinagar hospital alone, according to Pankaj Mishra. Others died through application of electric shocks, and particularly through "immersing the prisoners’ heads in water during interrogation." One commonly observed consequence of the use of torture through electrodes attached to the detainee's genitals is that released detainees find themselves either unable to consummate or sometimes even participate in normal sexual relationships. It is unknown how many deaths occurred at Papa II, the most intensive centre of its kind: on the tenth of every month, the relatives of some of the disappeared stage a public protest near the building, demanding information on their kin from the authorities; they claim about 10,000 have gone missing during the years of militancy. The Government of India contests that figure.

== Shut down ==
Following D.K. Basu vs West Bengal in December 1996, the Supreme Court of India, in its judgment, laid out restrictions on detention without trial in an attempt to curb custodial violence, and the election of the left-leaning United Front government at the Centre, most interrogation centres, including Papa II, were shut down.

Since then it has been used as a residence by senior state politicians, including the state finance minister. Currently it is the official residence of Mehbooba Mufti, who leads the People's Democratic Party, though her occupation of it is contested by those who would prefer it to be a memorial to the ones who disappeared.

== In popular culture ==
The interrogation centre is referred as Mama-II by the character of Roohdaar / Ghost (Hamlet), cast on Irrfan Khan in the 2014 Indian crime drama movie Haider (film) which is based on William Shakespeare's tragedy Hamlet and Basharat Peer's memoir Curfewed Night.
