= Vikalpa (politician) =

Bhutanese politician

Vikalpa (a nom de guerre meaning 'alternative') is a Bhutanese politician. He was the general secretary of the Central Organising Committee of the Bhutan Communist Party (Marxist-Leninist-Maoist). In January 2008, news reports surged saying that Vikalpa had been expelled from the party for allegedly being 'uncooperative, communal and opportunist'.
