= Mysore plateau =

Plateau in south India

Coordinates: 12.2°N 76.5°E

The Mysore plateau, also known as the South Karnataka plateau, is a plateau that is one of the four geographically unique regions of the Indian state of Karnataka. It has many undulations and is bounded on the west and south by the Western Ghats. Most of the river Kaveri flows through Karnataka in the Mysore Plateau. The average elevation in the region is between 600 and 900 meters. The plateau covers the districts of Bangalore, Bangalore Rural (Now Bangalore North district), Chamarajanagar, Hassan, Kodagu, Kolar, Mandya, Mysore and Tumkur.

== Overview ==
The name of the plateau is derived from Karunadu ("land of black soil"). The plateau has an area of about 73,000 square miles (190,000 square kilometres) and an average elevation of about 2,600 feet (790 metres). It consists of the Dharwar system of volcanic rocks, crystalline schists, and granites. The major rivers include the Godavari, Krishna, Kaveri, Tungabhadra, Sharavati, and Bhima. The Sharavati has the famous waterfall known as Jog Falls (830 feet or 253 metres). These falls are one of the most important sources of hydroelectric power in the country and are also a major tourist attraction. The plateau merges with the Nilgiri Hills in the south. Rainfall varies from 80 inches (2,000 mm) in the southern hills to 28 inches (710 mm) in the northern region.

Sandalwood is exported, and teak and eucalyptus are used chiefly to make furniture and paper. Manganese, chromium, copper, and bauxite are mined. There are large reserves of iron ore in the Baba Budan hills and gold in the Kolar Gold Fields. Jowar (grain sorghum), cotton, rice, sugarcane, sesame seeds, peanuts (groundnuts), tobacco, fruits, coconuts, and coffee are the major crops. Textile manufacturing, food and tobacco processing, and printing are the principal industries. Bangalore (Bengaluru), capital of Karnataka state, is the site of most of the industrial development. Important towns include Mysore, Bangalore, Tumakuru.

== See also ==
- Deccan Plateau
