= Vikalpa (journal) =

- Discipline: Business, management
- Language: English
- Edited by: Joshy Jacob

Publication details
- History: 1976–present
- Publisher: SAGE Publications
- Frequency: Quarterly

Standard abbreviations
- ISO 4: Vikalpa

Indexing
- ISSN: 0256-0909 (print); 2395-3799 (web)

Links
- Journal homepage; Online access; Online archive

Vikalpa: The Journal for Decision Makers is a quarterly peer-reviewed academic journal published by SAGE Publishing on behalf of the Indian Institute of Management Ahmedabad. It was established in January 1976.

== Abstracting and indexing ==
The journal is abstracted and indexed in EBSCO databases, ProQuest databases, and Scopus.
