= Marakkadavu =

- village
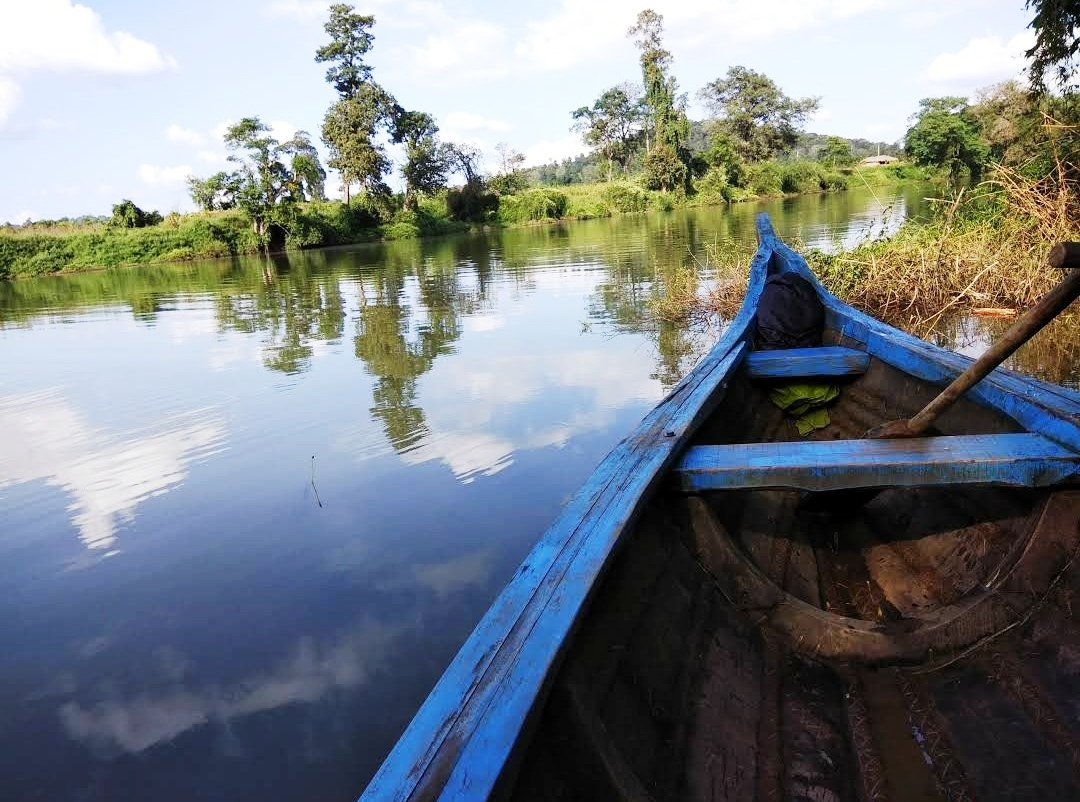
- Marakkadavu Kabini river

- Location in Kerala, India Marakkadavu (India)
- Coordinates: 11°52′10″N 76°11′0″E
- Country: India
- State: Kerala
- District: Wayanad

Languages
  - Official: Malayalam, English
- Time zone: UTC+5:30 (IST)
- PIN: 673579
- Telephone code: 04936-
- Vehicle registration: KL-73
- Literacy: 100%
- Lok Sabha constituency: Wayanad
- Climate: 23 To 40 (Köppen)

Marakkadavu is a small village near Pulpally in Kerala, India. It is located 1/2 km from the proposed Bhirakkuppa bridge. The tourist attractions are Kabini river, beautiful paddy fields and plantations. The nearest railway station is Mysore, and nearest airport is Kozhikode International Airport, around 145 km away.

Fishing is the main economic activity.

== Transportation ==
Marakkadavu can be accessed from Mananthavady or Kalpetta. The Periya ghat road connects Mananthavady to Kannur and Thalassery. The Thamarassery mountain road connects Calicut with Kalpetta. The Kuttiady mountain road connects Vatakara with Kalpetta and Mananthavady. The Palchuram mountain road connects Kannur and Iritty with Mananthavady. The road from Nilambur to Ooty is also connected to Wayanad through the village of Meppadi.

The nearest railway station is at Mysore and the nearest airports are Kozhikode International Airport-120 km, Bengaluru International Airport-290 km, and Kannur International Airport, 58 km.
