= School of Media and Cultural Studies =

Part of the Tata Institute of Social Sciences

The School of Media and Cultural Studies, (SMCS) is a part of the Tata Institute of Social Sciences in India, engaged in media teaching, film production, research and dissemination. The school was in the news recently because some of their students produced a documentary film Caste on the Menu Card which was not given permission to screen.

== Awards ==
SMCS films have won several awards.

== Digital archive ==
SMCS has a digital archive of films, video footage and photographs. It has a collection of over 2500 films.

The focus areas of the archive are development, including issues of globalization, marginalized groups, environment, disasters, movements, and ethnographic films from India and other countries.
