= Battle of Panamarathukotta =

Battle of Pancoorta Cottah
- Part of Wynaad Insurrection
Date	11 October 1802
Location	Wynaad, Kerala
Result	Cotiote Victory

Belligerents
British East India Company	Kingdom of Kottayam

Commanders and leaders
Arthur Wellesley; Capt. Dickenson †; Lt. Maxwell †	Edachena Kunkan Pazhassi Raja

The Battle of Panamarathukotta (or Pancoorta Cottah) was fought between the British East India Company and the Nairs in Wayanad, in the south Indian state of Kottayam. Rebel forces of the Kingdom of Kottayam under Edachena Kunkan engaged the East India Company troops led by Colonel Arthur Wellesley, Captain Dickenson, and Lieutenant Maxwell at Panamarathukota in Wayanad, Kerala. The engagement ended in a decisive rebel victory, inflicting heavy casualties on the company, including the deaths of Captain Dickenson and Lieutenant Maxwell.
