= Kerala Varma Pazhassi Raja (film) =

2009 film directed by Hariharan

Pazhassi Raja
- Theatrical release poster
- Directed by: Hariharan
- Written by: M. T. Vasudevan Nair
- Based on: Life of Pazhassi Raja
- Produced by: Gokulam Gopalan
- Starring: Mammootty
- Narrated by: Mohanlal (Malayalam); Kamal Haasan (Tamil); Shah Rukh Khan (Hindi)
- Cinematography: Ramanath Shetty
- Edited by: A. Sreekar Prasad
- Music by: Ilaiyaraaja
- Production company: Sree Gokulam Movies
- Distributed by: Sree Gokulam Movies
- Release date: 16 October 2009
- Running time: 200 minutes
- Country: India
- Language: Malayalam
- Budget: ₹20 crore
- Box office: est. ₹49 crore

Kerala Varma Pazhassi Raja is a 2009 Indian Malayalam-language historical drama film based on the life of Pazhassi Raja, a king who fought against the East India Company in the 18th century. The film was directed by Hariharan, written by M. T. Vasudevan Nair and produced by Gokulam Gopalan. It stars Mammootty in lead role with an ensemble supporting cast. The music score and soundtrack were created by Ilaiyaraaja, while its sound design is by Resul Pookutty.

The film won National Film Award for Best Feature Film in Malayalam, Best Background Score, Best Audiography and Special Mention (for Padmapriya). It received numerous other accolades, including eight Kerala State Film Awards and seven Filmfare Awards South.

Pazhassi Raja was produced at a cost of ₹200 million, making it the most expensive film made in Malayalam until that time. It is the first Malayalam film to get a home video release in the Blu-ray format. Originally filmed in Malayalam, Pazhassi Raja was dubbed in Tamil as well as Hindi. The film was released on 16 October 2009 across Kerala during the Diwali holiday with 150 prints; it ran for 150 days in theatres, emerged as a blockbuster and was one of the highest-grossing films in Malayalam cinema. It is often regarded as a classic in Malayalam cinema. The film received an overwhelming response and it has emerged as one of the top grossers in Kerala's box office history.

== Plot ==
The film starts in 1796, four years after the occupation of Malabar by the East India Company and towards the end of the First Pazhassi Revolt (1793–1797). The revolt is led by Kerala Varma, the Raja of Pazhassi Palace, of Kottayam house. The exploitation of the native Indian resources by the company had culminated in popular revolts against its authority across the district. With the help of Kerala Varma Pazhassi Raja's uncle Kurumbranadu ruler Veeravarma, who is jealous of Pazhassi Raja for his success and influence, and Raja's old companion Pazhayamveedan Chandhu, the Company act against Pazhassi Raja. This forces Pazhassi Raja to escape to the forests of Wayanad. The tribal force led by Neeli captures Assistant Collector Thomas Hervey Baber and his fiancée Dora in the jungle, in spite of his commander's objection. The Raja treats Thomas Baber and Dora as his guest and releases them.

From there, he begins guerrilla battles against the company. He is supported by his army chief Edachena Kunkan and his brother-in-law Kaitheri Ambu. In the guerrilla battle-front, Pazhassi Raja uses the expertise of Thalakkal Chandu, a Kurichya soldier, and Chandu's fiancée Neeli.

During the initial phases of the battle, the Company loses many men and much money. This compels them to make a peace treaty with Pazhassi Raja. Raja agrees, hoping that this move will bring peace to the area and his people. However, the conditions of the treaty are never observed by the company. This prompts Raja to start the battle again. Similarly, Dora leaves Thomas Baber for England, having learned the betrayal done by the company to the Raja and despite her objection to the hanging of a father and son, who refused to reveal the location of the Raja to the company. He forms useful alliances with many rulers and powerful families in the nearby places like Unni Mootha and his men.

Pazhassi Raja and his army successfully restart the battle. But the Company use heavily armed forces against him and succeed in luring many tribal leaders. This leads to the capture and subsequent hanging of Thalakkal Chandu as he was cheated by a tribal head.

The Company started hunting for Pazhassi and his army chief Edachena Kunkan. In a bloody fight, Edachena Kunkan kills Pazhayamveedan Chandhu. But he is surrounded by the company. Instead of surrendering before them, he commits suicide. This makes Raja's army weaker. But Pazhassi Raja, even though knowing that he is going to die, goes for a last fight against the company. After a glorious fight, Pazhassi Raja is killed by the company. The film ends with the assistant collector Thomas Baber placing the body of the Raja in a litter and his famous words: "He was our enemy. But he was a great warrior, a great man and we honour him." The Company officers respond by saluting the corpse of the Raja and acting as Pall-bearers.

== Cast ==
- Mammootty as Pazhassi Raja
- R. Sarathkumar as Edachena Kunkan Nair (voice dubbed by Shobi Thilakan)
- Manoj K. Jayan as Thalakkal Chandu
- Suresh Krishna as Kaitheri Ambu
- Suman as Pazhayamviden Chandu
- Kanika Subramaniam as Kaitheri Makkam
- Padmapriya Janakiraman as Neeli
- Jagathy Sreekumar as Kanara Menon
- Thilakan as Kurumbranaadu Raja Veera Varma
- Harry Key as Thomas Hervey Baber, Assistant Collector
- Linda Arsenio as Dora Baber
- Devan as Kannavathu Nambiar
- Lalu Alex as Emman Nair
- Captain Raju as Unni Mootha
- Jagadish as Bhandari
- Nedumudi Venu as Mooppan
- Mamukkoya as Athan Gurukkal
- Murali Mohan as Chirakkal Raja
- Ajay Rathnam as Subedar Cheran
- Susheel Kumar as Shekharan Warrier
- Urmila Unni as Chirakkal Thamburatty
- Valsala Menon as Kaitheri Thamburatty
- Yamini as Unniamma
- Abu Salim as Kunjambu, Malayali Soldier of British army
- Meghanathan as Vikraman, Malayali Soldier of British army
- Subair as Panicker, Malayali Soldier of British army
- Jayan Cherthala as Panikkasseri Kumaran Nambiar
- Peter Handley Evans as Major Robert Gordon
- Ross Elliot as Colonel James Bowles
- Tommy Donelly as Governor Jonathan Duncan
- Robin Pratt as Lieutenant Maxwell
- Simon Hewitt as Captain Dickinson
- Gary Richardson as Major Clapham
- Glen David Short as Major Murray
- J. Brandon Hill as Major Stephen

== Production ==
=== Development ===
In an interview with Sify in January 2007, Hariharan said: "We had first toyed with the idea of a film on Payyampalli Chanthu, a warrior, and then we thought of making a film on Thalakkal Chanthu, Pazhassi Raja's lieutenant, as the hero. But eventually we realized that it was the story of Pazhassi himself that needed to be told, in a new light. In this film, we would be focussing on his valiant fight against the British."

M. T. Vasudevan Nair, Hariharan, and Mammootty were working together after two decades; their previous association was Oru Vadakkan Veeragatha, which turned out into a landmark film in Malayalam. It was about Chanthu, a legendary warrior in the Northern Ballads. Through Pazhassi Raja, they made another biopic, on the life of Pazhassi Raja. Gokulam Gopalan was the film's producer. The total budget of the film is about ₹ 20 crores, which makes it the most expensive Malayalam film ever made. The sounds in the battle scenes of the film were recreated under Academy Award winner Resul Pookutty as he joined in the project only after its completion.

The Kerala High Court ordered the producers of the film to avail the benefit of entertainment tax concession for viewers of Pazhassi Raja.

=== Casting ===
Mammootty plays the title role of Pazhassi Raja. The female lead was offered to former Malayalam film actress, Samyuktha Varma but she refused the offer. There are three heroines: Padmapriya appearing as a tribal girl, Kanika as Pazhassi's wife and Linda Arsenio as Dora Baber, fiancée of Assistant Collector Thomas Baber. Linda is a theatre artist in New York who also acted in the film Kabul Express.

Through this film, Sarath Kumar makes his debut in Malayalam cinema. He portrays Edachena Kunkan, the chief lieutenant to Pazhashi Raja. Suresh Gopi was originally cast for the role. However, he refused to accept. Later, he clarified that he couldn't act in the film for personal reasons, and it would always be a loss for him. Suman portrayed Pazhayamveedan Chandu which marked his acting debut in Malayalam. Biju Menon was originally cast for the role, but he opted out after a few days of shooting, citing physical difficulties in shooting fight scenes.

=== Filming ===
The filming began in February 2007 from Palakkad. The filming lasted for two and a half years and was completed in August 2009. Sound mixer Resul Pookutty recreated all location scenes to ensure perfection. About the delay in making, Hariharan said: "The film's shoot took two years to complete, when it should have been completed in eight months. The delay was not because of me. Neither was it because my producer, Gokulam Gopalan, was short of money; I must really thank my producer, without whom a film like Pazhassi Raja would never have been made. The delay was because some of the stars were not willing to allot the extra time that was required for the film. They probably didn't realise this film would become a milestone in their careers. Making Pazhassi Raja was a great challenge for me. Directing Oru Vadakkan Veeragatha was a cakewalk, compared to this.".

== Deleted scene ==
Specifically, a sword fight sequence between Mammootty’s character, Pazhassi Raja, and Suman’s character, Pazhayaveedan Chanthu, was initially removed from the theatrical release due to the film's lengthy runtime. This scene was later reinstated into the film after 75 days of its release. However, it remained absent from television broadcasts and digital streaming platforms like Disney+Hotstar, leading to disappointment among fans who appreciated the intensity and choreography of the fight sequence.

The scene gained renewed attention when it surfaced on social media, where it quickly went viral. Fans praised the sequence for enhancing the film's dramatic impact and expressed regret that it was omitted from home video releases.

== Music ==
Kerala Varma Pazhassiraja

Soundtrack album by Ilaiyaraja
- Released: 20 September 2009
- Recorded: 2006–2009
- Genre: Feature film soundtrack
- Length: 26:42
- Language: Malayalam
- Label: Think Music
- Producer: Ilaiyaraja

Ilaiyaraja chronology
Bhagyadevatha (2009)	Kerala Varma Pazhassiraja (2009)	Bhagyada Balegara (2009)

The film features six original songs composed by Ilaiyaraaja. The original background score was composed by Ilaiyaraaja, conducted by László Kovács and performed by the Hungarian National Philharmonic Orchestra in Budapest. It took three months for Ilaiyaraaja to complete the background score. On 25 September, Think Music released a soundtrack album, featuring only the songs. The songs received mixed to negative critical reviews and "did not go the way that it was expected". Following the setback of the soundtrack album, Ilaiyaraaja stated that he was not satisfied with the lyrics of the poet O. N. V. Kurup, who penned two songs for the film. Ilaiyaraaja won the National Film Award for Best Background Score

=== Track listing ===
==== Original version ====
No.	Title	Lyrics	Artist(s)	Length
1.	"Maathanganana"	Traditional	K. J. Yesudas	1:16
2.	"Kunnathae"	O. N. V. Kurup	K. S. Chithra	5:12
3.	"Aadiysha Sandhya"	O. N. V. Kurup	K. J. Yesudas, M. G. Sreekumar, Chandra Sekharan, Vidhu Prathap	5:29
4.	"Ambum Kombum"	Gireesh Puthenchery	Ilaiyaraaja, Manjari, Kuttappan	4:59
5.	"Odathandil Thalam Kottum Kattil"	Gireesh Puthenchery	Chandra Sekharan, Sangeetha Sajith	5:07
6.	"Aalamadangal"	Kanesh Punoor	M. G. Sreekumar, Vidhu Prathap, Ashraf Thayineri, Edavanna Gafoor, Faisal Elettil, Krishnanunni	4:47

==== Tamil version ====
All lyrics are written by Vaali; all music is composed by Ilaiyaraaja.

No.	Title	Artist(s)	Length
1.	"Mathangananamabjavasa" (Lyrics: Traditional Sanskrit Sloka)	K. J. Yesudas	1:16
2.	"Kundrathu"	K. S. Chithra	5:12
3.	"Aadi Mudhal"	Madhu Balakrishnan, Rahul Nambiar, Roshini	5:29
4.	"Agilamellam"	Murali	4:59
5.	"Moongil Thanni"	Karthik, Roshini	5:07
6.	"Ambum Kombum"	Rahul Nambiar, Priya Himesh	4:47

==== Hindi version ====
All lyrics are written by Manoj Santoshi and Manisha Korde; all music is composed by Ilaiyaraaja.

No.	Title	Artist(s)	Length
1.	"Pritam Dil"	Shreya Ghoshal	5:01
2.	"Yaar Hai Badle"	Shaan, Kunal Ganjawala	4:42
3.	"Yeh Dharti Bhi"	Shaan, Kunal Ganjawala	5:16

== Release ==
The film was released on 16 October as a Diwali release with 130 prints in the original Malayalam version and later on 17 November with 150 prints in Tamil. Later, on 27 September 2013, Goldmines Telefilms launched the trailer of the Hindi dubbed version of the film, at their YouTube channel. The full Hindi version of the film was digitally released on YouTube on 11 October 2013.

=== Home video ===
Moser Baer Home Entertainment released the film on Blu-ray Disc, DVD, SuperDVD and VCD in India. The home video rights was bought by Moser Baer for a record sum of ₹ 62 lakhs. Pazhassi Raja was the first regional language film to be released in the Blu-ray format. The DVD version of the film was released on 1 May 2010 as a two-DVD set. It is available in 16:9 Anamorphic widescreen, Dolby Digital 5.1 Surround, progressive 24 FPS, widescreen and NTSC format.

== Reception ==
=== Critical response ===
Nowrunning comments that the film is an "exotic chronicle that stuns us with its fascinating tale", and that "this is the stuff that tours de force are made of". Rediff gave the film 3.5 stars out of 5, praising the script and the technical brilliance of the film. Sify described the film as one "that will be treasured for years to come".

However, Rediff also stated that "sentimentalism bogs down the pace [of the film]" at several occasions of the story. Ilayaraja's music also received criticism, and the critics further accused the film of taking some cinematic liberties on history. The Hindu said, "the host of people who play English Lords and East India Company chiefs appears theatrical. Even Linda Arsenio, the English Lady Dora Baber, isn't spontaneous" and "while on editing, certain parts seem to have been trimmed in haste and hence hang without relevance. Strangely, despite an action-oriented story and mind-boggling stunts, the film sags at points." Other critics pointed the sloppy fight scenes and the English accent of Padmapriya who has dubbed for herself in the film.

=== Box office ===
Kerala Varma Pazhassi Raja collected around ₹ 1.65 crore from first day over the all releasing centres. The film had a record opening, collecting ₹ 7.65 crore in its first week, which was the highest ever first week recorded for a film in Kerala, at the time it was released. The film collected ₹ 31 lakhs in its first week in Chennai box office. In 2 months, the film grossed ₹18 crores. The film collected a revenue of about ₹32 crore after its theatrical run. The film ran for 150 days in 5 theatres in Kerala and grossed ₹49 crore in total as revenue and business.

== Accolades ==
Organisation	Award	Category	Winner
Directorate of Film Festivals	National Film Awards	Best Feature Film in Malayalam	Gokulam Gopalan
Directorate of Film Festivals	National Film Awards	Special Jury Award	Padmapriya
Directorate of Film Festivals	National Film Awards	Best Background Score	Ilaiyaraaja
Directorate of Film Festivals	National Film Awards	Best Audiography	Resul Pookutty
Kerala State Chalachitra Academy	Kerala State Film Award	Best Director	Hariharan
Kerala State Chalachitra Academy	Kerala State Film Award	Best Screenplay	M. T. Vasudevan Nair
Kerala State Chalachitra Academy	Kerala State Film Award	Second Best Actor	Manoj K. Jayan
Kerala State Chalachitra Academy	Kerala State Film Award	Second Best Actress	Padmapriya
Kerala State Chalachitra Academy	Kerala State Film Award	Best Film Editor	A. Sreekar Prasad
Kerala State Chalachitra Academy	Kerala State Film Award	Best Art Director	Muthuraj
Kerala State Chalachitra Academy	Kerala State Film Award	Best Costume Designer	Natarajan
Kerala State Chalachitra Academy	Kerala State Film Award	Best Dubbing Artist	Shoby Thilakan
Filmfare	Filmfare Awards South	Best Film	
Filmfare	Filmfare Awards South	Best Director	Hariharan
Filmfare	Filmfare Awards South	Best Supporting Actor	Manoj K. Jayan
Filmfare	Filmfare Awards South	Best Supporting Actress	Padmapriya
Filmfare	Filmfare Awards South	Best Lyricist	O. N. V. Kurup
Filmfare	Filmfare Awards South	Best Male Playback	K. J. Yesudas for "Aadiushassandhya Poothathivide"
Filmfare	Filmfare Awards South	Best Female Playback	K. S. Chithra for "Kunnathe Konnaykum"
Annual Malayalam Movie Awards	Annual Malayalam Movie Awards (Dubai)	Best Movie	
Annual Malayalam Movie Awards	Annual Malayalam Movie Awards (Dubai)	Best Director	Hariharan
Annual Malayalam Movie Awards	Annual Malayalam Movie Awards (Dubai)	Best Script Writer	M. T. Vasudevan Nair
Annual Malayalam Movie Awards	Annual Malayalam Movie Awards (Dubai)	Best Actress	Kanika
Annual Malayalam Movie Awards	Annual Malayalam Movie Awards (Dubai)	Best Supporting Actor	Manoj K. Jayan
Annual Malayalam Movie Awards	Annual Malayalam Movie Awards (Dubai)	Best Special Performance	Padmapriya
Annual Malayalam Movie Awards	Annual Malayalam Movie Awards (Dubai)	Best Music Director	Ilaiyaraaja
Annual Malayalam Movie Awards	Annual Malayalam Movie Awards (Dubai)	Best Singer (Female)	K. S. Chithra
Annual Malayalam Movie Awards	Annual Malayalam Movie Awards (Dubai)	Best Sound Effects & Engineering	Resul Pookutty and Amrit Pritam
Surya TV	Surya Film Awards	Best Script Writer	M. T. Vasudevan Nair
Surya TV	Surya Film Awards	Best Actor	Mammootty
Surya TV	Surya Film Awards	Best Actress	Padmapriya
Surya TV	Surya Film Awards	Best Art Director	Muthuraj
Surya TV	Surya Film Awards	Best Make-up man	George
Surya TV	Surya Film Awards	Best Costume designer	Natarajan
Surya TV	Surya Film Awards	Best Male Dubbing Artiste	Shoby Thilakan
Vanitha	Vanitha Film Awards	Best Script Writer	M. T. Vasudevan Nair
Vanitha	Vanitha Film Awards	Best Actor	Mammootty
Vanitha	Vanitha Film Awards	Best Actress	Padmapriya
Vanitha	Vanitha Film Awards	Best Supporting Actor	Sarath Kumar
Vanitha	Vanitha Film Awards	Best Male Singer	K. J. Yesudas
Vanitha	Vanitha Film Awards	Best Female Singer	K. S. Chithra
Kalakeralam	Kalakerala Film Awards	Best Film	
Kalakeralam	Kalakerala Film Awards	Best Actor	Mammootty
Kalakeralam	Kalakerala Film Awards	Second Best Actor	Manoj K. Jayan
Kalakeralam	Kalakerala Film Awards	Best Music Director	Ilaiyaraaja
Asianet	Asianet Film Awards	Best Film Award	Gokulam Gopalan
