= Kottayam (disambiguation) =

Kottayam is a city in Kottayam District, Kerala, India.

Kottayam may also refer to:

- Kingdom of Kottayam also Cotiote, a former kingdom in India
  - Cotiote War, between the kingdom and the British East India Company
- Kottayam District, the district in Kerala, India
- Kottayam Taluk, Madras Presidency, former administrative subdivision in British India
- Kottayam-Malabar, town in Kannur district, Kerala, India
