= Pallur Eman =

- Born: India
- Died: 1820; Prince of Wales Island
- Years active: 1799– 1820

Pallūr Ēman Nāyar(Poligar Eman" "Pulior Eman" (died 1820 in Malaya) was a Nayar lord of southern Wayanad, north east Kerala, India. He was involved in the Cotiote War (1793–1806), a conflict between the Cotiote princely ruler Pazhassi and the British East India Company. In 1799, Eman fought with the British. In 1802, Eman became a double agent for Pazhassi, who was his overlord.

== British recruitment and espionage ==
The British considered Eman "a man of considerable property and rank". In 1799, he was an advisor to the British with a wage of 200 rupees per year. Eman encamped with Arthur Wellesley, 1st Duke of Wellington and in 1801, his services to the British contributed to their capture of Periya. In 1801 and 1802, Pazhassi struggled. His once trusted commander, Pazhayamviden Chandu betrayed Pazhassi to the British. As the British tracked him down, the Raja and his men kept up a running engagement with his pursuers. During this time, Eman continued to support Pazhassi as a double agent. Eman's older brother, Pallur Rayrappan Nayar also supported Pazhassi until his arrest by the British in 1806.

=== Discovery, escape and tribal alliance ===
When the British captured the fort at Panamaram in 1802, Eman's double agent status was discovered and he fled to join Pazhassi. The British put a reward of 1,000 pagodas on Eman's capture. Eman persuaded the Mullukurumba, a warrior tribe, to support Pazhassi.

=== Attack on Malabar sub-jail. ===
On 23 March 1802, Eman and 1,000 rebels marched through the Thamarasseri Defile towards Calicut and overran the sub-jail. The 250 sub-jail guards were captured of killed. Ammunition and stores were stolen. Many of the freed prisoners joined Eman. McLeod, collector of Malabar, resigned. Eman continued to fight the British. Pashassi died in November 1805 and his leadership assumed by his nephew. Eman was captured by the British in 1806.

=== Imprisonment, exile and death ===
Eman was tried at Srirangapatna and sentenced to death. His sentence was subsequently commuted to life imprisonment. In about 1807, Eman and his brother were sent to Prince of Wales Island (Penang Island). Some of the rebels were released in late 1819 but not Eman. The British felt that if he were released to his homeland, he would stir discontent. Eman died at Prince of Wales Island in 1820.

== See also ==
- Cotiote War

== Bibliography ==
- Kurup K. K. N. "Pazhassi Samarangal." 1980.
- Nair C. G. "Wynad, its peoples and traditions." Asian Educational Services 2000. p32 – 33. ISBN 978-8120615236. Accessed 19 October 2012.
