= Edachena Kunkan =

Indian army commander

Edachena Kunkan (also known as Edachena Kunkan Nair) was a Wayanad Nair noble from Tirunelli, Wayanad, Kerala, India who joined the war effort of Pazhassi Raja during the 1770s and became commander of the Raja's army. His younger brothers (Edachena Komappan Nair, Edachena Othenan Nair and Edachena Ammu) joined him as generals. Kunkan was a popular leader in Wayanad, gathering support from people of many classes for Raja's war against the East India Company.

== Commander ==
Under Kunkan's leadership, Pazhassi's troops fought against Hyder Ali and Tipu Sultan as far as the outskirts of Mysore. This enlarged the Raja's sphere of influence, and he claimed territories as far as Nanjangud.

During Hyder's siege of Thalasseri, with help from Chirakkal and Kadathanad [1779–1782], Raja sent 1,000 troops commanded by Kunkan (who repulsed all assaults by the Mysore army). The siege was later broken by a joint British-Pazhassi attack in 1782.

=== Capture of Panamaram Fort ===
The British increased taxes on farmers and demanded half the rice crop, to the dissatisfaction of the Wyanad people. When a member of the British Raj demanded a paddy field, Kunkan killed him and 150 Kurichiyans under Thalakkal Chandu then joined him. With these troops and his brothers' support, Kunkan attacked the fort at Panamaram. It was guarded by 70 soldiers from the 1st Battalion of the 4th Bombay Infantry under Captain Dickenson and Lieutenant Maxwell; both commanders and 25 soldiers were killed on 11 October 1802. After massacring the detachment, Kunkan acquired 112 muskets and six boxes of ammunition, with a value of ₹6,000. The buildings were razed, igniting a widespread revolt in Wayanad against British rule.

=== Guerilla warfare ===
Shortly afterwards, Kunkan went to the Pulpally Pagoda and appealed to all Wayandians to join the rebel ranks; three thousand men volunteered. From then until early 1804, Pazhassi rebels launched guerrilla attacks on British positions throughout North Malabar, reaching the coastal towns of Kannur, Thalassery and Kozhikode. Kunkan confronted the British twice: in 1802 at Wayanad, where he tried to block British troops en route to Mananthavadi and in 1803 when he tried to besiege an outpost at Pazhassi. Both failed, leading him to concentrate on guerrilla warfare. The British announced a reward of 1,000 pagodas for Kunkan's arrest. By November 1805, the rebels were on the run and after Raja's death, Kunkan ("that determined and incorrigible rebel") was killed by British troops at Panniyil (now Pannichal) in Edavaka.

== Memorial ==
The people of Kerala have asked the government to build a memorial at Panamaram to Kunkan and Thalakkal Chanthu, since the Pazhassi rebellion is considered one of the most important uprisings against the British in South India.

== In popular culture ==
In the 2009 Hariharan directed film Pazhassi Raja, Mammootty played the title role while Edachena Kungan was portrayed, by Sarath Kumar.

== See also ==
- Pallur Eman
- Pallur Rayrappan
- Wynad
- Battle of Panamarathukotta
