= Siege of Tellicherry =

Siege of Tellicherry (Thalassery), Kerala
- Part of Second Anglo-Mysore War
Date	30 December 1779 – 18 January 1782 (2 years, 2 weeks and 5 days)
Location	Tellicherry (modern-day Thalassery, Kerala, India) 11°45′N 75°29′E
Result	British victory

Belligerents
East India Company; Kingdom of Kottayam	Kingdom of Mysore: Chirakkal; Kadathanad

Commanders and leaders
Major John Cotgrave; Major William Abington; Pazhassi Raja	(Kingdom of Mysore) Sardar Ali Khan Sahib

The siege of Tellicherry was a military embargo that happened in Thalassery (North Malabar). The Commander in Chief of the Mysore Calicut Province, Sirdar Ali, took siege of the British Military Barrack of Thalassery for 18 months. The British and the local administrators were blockaded within Thalassery by land as well as by sea. It was during the Second Anglo-Mysore War.

The siege continued until reinforcements from Bombay under the command of Major Abington attacked the Mysore army and defeated them. Major Abington then moved south, capturing Calicut. The Siege of Tellicherry led to the fall of strongholds of the First Mysore conquest, led by Hyder Ali. Even though later Tipu Sultan came from Mysore to reinstate the conquered area to previous status.

== Background ==
Tellicherry (Thalassery) rose to become a fortified coastal harbor and major town under English East India Company control. The British got this site in 1705 from Kolathiri Raja of Northern Malabar.

Hyder Ali, ruler of Mysore had no love for the British and had already fought a war with British. His objective during second war was to oust British from South India and conquer whole of South India.

Malabar was under continuous occupation of Hyder's troops since 1774 and the whole country of Malabar was in a state of constant rebellion. The British supplied arms and ammunition to rebels and this displeased Hyder.

Also Tellicherry was a major naval base of the British in south west coast of India. Hyder's conquest of Tellicherry would have been a big blow to British naval position in waters of Peninsular India.

== Siege ==
=== Initial siege by Rama Varma ===
So in order to block flow of guns and ammunition to rebellious Rajahs and chiefs of Malabar as well as to cripple British naval power, Hyder Ali decided to conquer Tellicherry as part of his larger plan to oust British from South India.

So Hyder ordered his vassal Rama Varma, Rajah of Chirakkal to besiege Tellicherry in 1778. Rajah did so with a large army but Hyder's opponent, Kerala Varma Pazhassi Raja, acting Rajah of Kottayam (Thalassery) and an ally of British then, took to field and surrounded the besiegers of Tellicherry and cut off all their supplies and communications and forced them to retreat.

But in 1779, Chirakkal army of 4,000 supported by a Mysore contingent of 2,500 men defeated Kottayam army and then invaded the neighboring pro-British kingdom of Kadathanad and installed a puppet Rajah on throne who put that part of Kadathanad army (2,000 men) which supported him at Hyder's disposal.

=== Main siege 1779–1782 ===
This large host once more besieged Tellicherry in 1779 and as British garrison was perilously short on men and food, Pazhassi Rajah sent 1000 men and his entire surplus harvest to Tellicherry fort. This bought time for the beleaguered garrison. Soon siege progressed and British bought reinforcements and artillery. At the beginning, British had only two battalions in Tellicherry. But 1000 men of Pazhassi Rajah was soon supplemented by another four battalions and a good train of artillery.

==== British victory ====
British and their ally Kottayam contingent fought a desperate defense for months – each assault of the Mysore army was repelled and the siege went on till 1782.

Then British command pondered over the plan suggested by Kerala Varma Pazhassi Raja. British garrison must launch a sortie to break the besieger army into two and link up with another of his army who will strike enemy in rear. Soon they decided to adopt this plan.

As British and Kottayam troops launched a furious assault on besiegers in 1782 – as planned sudden appearance of another 1000 men of Kottayam Rajah in rear proved fatal to Mysore army and their allies who were split into two halves. Enemy retreated in confusion and panic and a considerable number was taken prisoner.

Sirdar Khan, seriously wounded and sick, fell prisoner and died in captivity. This disaster for Mysore army roused rebels all over Malabar into a massive rebellion and decimated all the Mysore regiments of occupation and recovered their freedom for a short period.

== Some of the protagonists ==
- Lieut Peter Campbell
- Ensign Alwright
- Capt Muirhead 20th Madras Battalion
- Lieut Barry Close

== See also ==
- Anglo-Mysore Wars
- Mysore invasion of Kerala
