= Pallur Rayrappan =

Pallur Rayrappan was a supporter of Kerala Varma Pazhassi Raja of Kerala, India, who fought a guerrilla-type war against the British East India Company during the first decade of the 19th century.

== Background ==
Pazahassi Raja was defeated in battle by British and took to the forests of Wynad along with his family. From there he conducted a guerrilla campaign against the British until his death in 1806. Pallur Rayrappan was one of his supporters and helped him to fight against British forces in the forests of Kerala. The British announced a prize of 300 pagodas for helping to arrest Rayrappan, whose younger brother, Pallur Eman, was also a part of Raja's guerrilla force and had a prize of 1000 pagodas on his head.

Pallur Rayrappan was killed fighting the British in January 1806 on a hill named Tirumalapad of Nilambur and before his capture, he critically wounded a British soldier.
