= Pazhayamviden Chandu =

Army General

Pazhayaveettil Chandu Nambiar, also known as Pazhayamviden Chandu, was a general of Pazhassi Raja whose betrayal led to the death of his Raja and the British victory in the Cotiote War.

== Early life ==
Originally from a poor family, due to starvation he joined the retinue of Pazhassi Raja as a boy. Pazhassi Raja loved him as his own son and was impressed by the ability and courage of Chandu. So he gave the best training to Chandu in war and administration and appointed him as a Karyakar or minister. Raja also made Chandu, a commoner by birth, into a noble. Raja asked a Nambiar noble clan of Pazhayveedu to adopt him. Thus Chandu became Pazhayaveettil Chandu Nambiar and hence came his nickname Pazhyamviden.

== Marriage ==
Raja also arranged his marriage with a lady named Unniamma, who was sister of famous Kaitheri Ambu. Ambu, who probably detected the true self of Chandu, was reportedly not very pleased with this alliance. He consented only because he could not say no to Raja.

== Military service ==
Chandu fought bravely in Pazhassi Raja's warfare with Mysore troops. He was reputedly one of the ablest fighters in whole of Kerala of his time and he was very arrogant about it.

== Double agent ==
Chandu after 1793 openly broke off his ties with Raja and joined forces with his uncle Vira Varma and then, with English East India Company. But he was a spy who informed his master Kerala Varma Pazhassi about moves and plans made by enemies. He even came close to Wellesley who mention about him in his dispatches as Pye Vittil Chandoo.

== Betrayal of his Raja ==
In 1805, Chandu disclosed all secrets about Pazhassi war machine to English which resulted in complete collapse of rebel resistance and even surprised Pazhassi Raja in his hideout where he was killed in a gun battle. Chandu is reportedly said to have betrayed his master for money.

== Death ==
He died in mysterious circumstances - he was found murdered most probably by Pazhassi partisans in revenge. It is also said that it was English who did that as they felt he had outlived his utility, and also as a punishment for espionage he did for rebel Raja for nearly 12 years.

== See also ==
- Pazhassi Raja (2009 film)
