= Kannavath Sankaran Nambiar =

Kannavath Sankaran Nambiar (c. 1760 – 27 November 1801) was the prime minister, or Sarvadikaryakar, of Pazhassi Raja in what is today India. Sankaran led rebel forces against the British East India Company in two campaigns before he was captured and executed.

The word "Kannavath" means "that which is associated with Kannavam". Kannavam is a village in Thalasseri taluk of Kannur district in the State of Kerala. However, "Kannavam" is also the name of the dominant feudal Nair (Nambiar) clan resident to this village. The Kannavath Nambiars were vassals of Kottayam Raja. They were once the richest landlords in Northern Malabar. Sankaran was born into this feudal clan.

== Early life ==
As a teenager, Sankaran joined Pazhassi Raja's war effort to oust Mysoreans from Kottayam. Pleased with Sankaran's courage, determination, loyalty along with his skill in diplomacy and administration, the Rajah appointed him as his prime minister.

One of Pazhassi rajah's main headquarters was located in Todikulam, part of Sankaran's fief. Much of Sanakaran's fief was covered with mountains and woods inhabited by Kurichia tribesmen. These tribesman assisted Sankaranin the campaigns against Mysore and the British.

== War with the British ==
During first war with British, Sankaran along with Kaitheri Ambu played a major role. He was present in Todikulam when Pazhassi's troops, entrenched in a fortified temple, fought the British in 1797. The British suffered severe losses in this battle, including the deaths of senior leaders Captain Bachelor and Captain William Brown.

In June 1800, Sankaran collected a large band of rebels to fight the British again. The British, on 4 August 1801, proclaimed him an outlaw and imposed the death penalty on him.

Sankaran and his men helped the Raja evade capture and came into agreement with rebels in South Malabar, one of them being Manjeri Athan Gurikkal. Sankaran also conducted guerilla warfare against the British troops.

== Arrest and execution ==
On 27 November 1801, Sankaran and a small band of rebels were camped at Kuttiyadi. A local resident betrayed them to the British, who captured the rebels and transported them to Kannavam.

In Kannavam, on the execution grounds, the British repeatedly promised Sankaran a pardon and reward if he revealed Pazhassi Raja's hideout. Sankaran rebuffed the offer. He informed the British that "he will get a far greater reward in heaven if he remained loyal to his king." His son, his nephew, his brother and his other followers also refused.

Sankaran then reportedly put the noose around his neck with his own hands and his followers did the same. The following morning. the residents of Kannavam saw their corpses still hanging, as they had not yet been buried.

The place of execution for Sankaran and his followers is now a memorial site called as Kuritikalam

== In popular culture ==
The character, Kannavath Nambiar, appears in the Malayalam period film Kerala Varma Pazhassi Raja, played by Devan.
