= Vira Varma =

Vira Varma (born 1753) was the second-ranking prince of Kingdom of Kottayam and last Raja of Kurumbranad. He is more famous as the uncle of his better known nephew Pazhassi Raja. Vira Varma and his nephew Kerala Varma (Pazhassi Raja) rose to prominence in turbulent days that followed Hyder Ali's invasion of Malabar in 1774.

Described as a wicked and scheming person, Vira Varma also had vengeful and jealous disposition and was always at loggerheads with Pazhassi Raja. In 1792, he surrendered his kingdom to the British and agreed to collect and pay tribute fixed by British officials. In 1793, he was adopted by Rama Raja of Kurumbranad as successor.

His cruel revenue policy led to a peasant rebellion led by his nephew, Pazhassi Raja. This rebellion turned into a full blown war between the British and Pazhassi Raja. In 1797, Pazhassi Raja won the war and one of his terms was for the British to recognize his claim that Vira Varma must not be permitted to rule Kottayam, since being Raja of Kurumbranad had removed his right to his native home. Britain accepted his claim and thus, ended Vira Varma's dream to rule Kottayam and Kurumbranad together.
