= Sankaran Moopan =

Indian military commander

Pullambil Sankaran Mooppan was an ancient chief commander of the Pazhassi Raja.

The Pullambil Mooppan's Thiyyar family of Thellicherry and the families Vazhayil Moopan and Vamala Moopan seem to have engaged in sea trade.
