= Thalakkal Chanthu =

Archer and military leader

Thalakkal Chanthu, also spelled Thalakkal Chandu, was an archer and commander-in-chief of the Kurichya soldiers of the Pazhassi Raja who fought British forces in the Wayanad jungles during the first decade of the 19th century.

== Career ==
Chanthu began his career under Edachena Kunkan, who later promoted him to the rank of general. Pazhassi Raja and his other generals and troops saw Chanthu as their ablest war leader.

== Panamaram fort massacre ==
The British East India Company imposed a high revenue tax on agricultural produce of Wayanad farmers causing widespread dissent. One of the Company peons was killed by Edachena Kunkan when the peon demanded paddy from a Kuruchiya man. This prompted the entire Kuruchiya tribe to join hands with Edachana Kunkan who was carrying on a fight against the British on behalf of Pazhassi Raja. The rebellion on 11 October 1802 by a group of tribal soldiers (comprising 175 Kurichya archers), led by Thalakkal Chandu and Edachena Kunkan, captured the British fort at Panamaram which was defended by the I battalion of 4th Bombay infantry. Commanding officer Capt. Dickinson and Lt. Maxwell were killed in action along with entire detachment of 70 soldiers which was guarding the fort.

The British forces launched a retaliatory attack and trapped Chanthu on 15 November 1805. He was executed under a Koly tree. Edachana Kunkan committed suicide when he was surrounded at Panniyil later (now called Pannichal, Kerala).

== Memorial ==
The Kerala State Government installed a memorial to Chanthu on 22 September 2012, near Panamaram Fort on the banks of the Kabini River. In the form of a museum, the memorial displays weapon models used by Chanthu and his tribesmen, the Kurichiya archers and the tribe's traditional agricultural implements.
