= Kottayam War =

Conflict in India (1793–1806)

Kottayam (Cotiote) War
- Part of the Battles involving the British East India Company
| Date | 1793–1806 |
| Location | Wayanad |
| Result | British victory |

Belligerents
| British East India Company | Kingdom of Kottayam |

Commanders and leaders
| Arthur Wellesley; Robert Bowles; James Stevenson; Capt.Lawrence; Capt. Bowman †; Capt. Troy †; Lt. Bond †; Lachlan Macquarie (WIA); Maj. Cameron †; Lt. Nugent †; Lt. Madge †; Lt. Rudderman †; Lt.Millinchamp (WIA); Lt. Mealey; Capt.Batchelor †; Capt.Browne †; Sjt.Wilson †; Col.Dunlop; Col.Dow; Capt.Dickenson †; Lt.Maxwell † | Pazhassi Raja †; Edachena Kunkan (executed); Kannavath Sankaran (executed); Kaitheri Ambu; Kanoth Nambiar |

Strength
| 14,000 | 6,000 |

Casualties and losses
| Unknown heavy | Unknown heavy |

The Kottayam War also known as the Cotiote War refers to a series of continuous struggles fought between the Kottayam king, Pazhassi Raja Kerala Varma, and the East India Company across a span of thirteen years between 1793 and 1806. Pazhassi Raja aimed to preserve the independence and unity of his kingdom while the East India Company was determined to annex and dismember it. His own desire for independence and sense of betrayal by the East India Company on their earlier promise to respect his country's independence, combined with constant exhortations of two of his noblemen, Kaitheri Ambu and Kannavath Sankaran, led to outbreak of the Kottayam War. It is the longest war waged by the East India Company during their military campaigns on the Indian subcontinent – much longer than the Anglo-Mysore Wars, Anglo-Maratha Wars, Anglo-Sikh Wars and Polygar Wars. It was one of the bloodiest and hardest wars waged by the East India Company in India – Presidency army regiments that participated suffered losses as high as eighty percent in 10 years of warfare. The Kottayam army waged guerrilla warfare, chiefly centred in the mountain forests of Aralam and Wayanad, and larger zone of conflict extended from Mysore to the Arabian Sea, from Coorg to Coimbatore. Warfare peaked in early 1797, 1800 to 1801, and 1803 to 1804 and due to constant reverses, Bombay regiments were withdrawn and instead Madras regiments were deployed with an increase in troop numbers - from 8,000 in 1803 to 14,000 in early 1804. The Kottayam War ended within months of the death of Kottayam leader, Pazhassi Raja in a skirmish on 30 November 1805. Following this war, the kingdom of Kottayam was annexed into the district of Malabar in the Madras Presidency.

The East India Company military had 6,000 men in the beginning, which was increased to 8,000 in 1800 and to 14,000 in 1804. Arthur Wellesley was in charge of operations between 1800 and 1804. The Kottayam army manpower is not exactly known - estimates vary between 2,000 and 6,000. The Kottayam army was well equipped with fire-locks, but ran short of musket ammunition after 1799 and so used bows and swords widely. 10 years of war had caused an 80 percent loss in the East India Company ranks - both European officers and Sepoys. No estimate is available regarding the death toll in the Kottayam armies.

Pazhassi's Cave, located in Cherambadi on the Nilgiri-Wayanad border, is believed to have been a strategic hideout and observation post used during the Kottayam War (1793–1806) led by Kerala Varma Pazhassi Raja. The cave's remote location amidst dense forests made it ideal for Guerrilla tactics employed by the Kottayam forces against the British East India Company around 1800. On 28 February 2025, Kochu Thampuratty Subha Varma, the great-granddaughter of Pazhassi Raja, visited the site with her husband Dr. Kishore and formally named it "Pazhassi's Cave" in honor of its historic significance. The visit renewed local interest in Pazhassi Raja's legacy and the cave's role in India's early resistance against colonial rule.

== First Pazhassi Revolt ==
=== Attack on Convoy to Major Anderson ===
On January 27, 1797, rebel forces led by Kerala Varma Pazhassi Raja launched a surprise attack on a British East India Company convoy delivering supplies to Major Anderson's position at Manandery, Wayanad, Malabar, India, during the First Pazhassi Revolt. The convoy, likely escorted by a small detachment of sepoys, was targeted as part of the rebels' guerrilla campaign to disrupt British logistics in the region. The attackers, comprising Nairs and Kurichiyas, leveraged their knowledge of Wayanad's rugged terrain to execute the assault, catching the British off guard. The engagement resulted in the deaths of three sepoys and wounds to twenty others, including one jemadar. The rebels also seized the convoy's stores and ammunition, significantly hampering British operations in Manandery.

=== Ambush at Manandery ===
The Ambush at Manandery was a surprise attack carried out in 1797 by rebel forces of the Kingdom of Kottayam during the Kottayam War. Under the command of Kaitheri Ambu, the rebels attacked a detachment of the East India Company led by Captain Bowman, Captain Troy, and Lieutenant Bond near Manandery in present-day Kerala. The engagement ended in a decisive rebel victory, with heavy losses for the company, including the deaths of all three commanding officers.

=== Attack at Periah Pass ===
The Attack at Periah Pass was a military engagement on 18 March 1797 during the Kottayam War, in which forces of the Kingdom of Kottayam under Pazhassi Raja ambushed and defeated a column of the East India Company at Periah Pass in Wayanad, Kerala. The action resulted in heavy casualties for the company, including the deaths of several officers, and the capture of baggage and artillery by the rebels.

=== Battles of Devote Angady and Cunjote Angady ===
From 9 to 11 March 1797, during the First Pazhassi Revolt, a Company detachment of some 150–200 sepoys led by Lt. Mealey (with Lt. Millinchamp wounded) engaged with thousands of Nair and Kurichiya rebels under Pazhassi Raja in the Wayanad area. The Kottayam forces used their superior numbers and terrain advantage to overwhelm the British over three days near Devote Angady and Cunjote Angady. British losses were about 38 killed or missing—including 1 subadar, 2 havildars, 2 naigues, 1 waterman, and 32 sepoys—and 67 wounded; rebel casualties are unrecorded.

=== Battle of Tadikulam ===
The Battle of Tadikulam, fought between April and July 1797 during the First Pazhassi Revolt, saw British forces under Colonels Dow and Dunlop clash with rebels led by Kanoth Nambiar in Malabar, India. As part of the Manattana/Tadikulam operations, the British captured Tadikulam and demolished Nambiar's house, achieving a tactical success despite losing Brigade Major Captain Batchelor and sustaining some casualties among Europeans and sepoys. This engagement helped secure a temporary truce in 1797, though the revolt later resumed.

== Second Pazhassi Revolt ==
=== Battle of Panamarathukota ===
The Battle of Panamarathukota (also called the Battle of Pancoorta Cottah) was fought on 11 October 1802 during the Kottayam War. Rebel forces of the Kingdom of Kottayam under Edachena Kunkan engaged the East India Company troops led by Colonel Arthur Wellesley, Captain Dickenson, and Lieutenant Maxwell at Panamarathukota in Wayanad, Kerala. The engagement ended in a decisive rebel victory, inflicting heavy casualties on the company, including the deaths of Captain Dickenson and Lieutenant Maxwell.
