= Pazhassi Raja =

Head of the Kottayam Kingdom (1753–1805)

- Kerala Varma, Raja of Kingdom of Kottayam, Kerala Simham, Chandrakula Vira, Shaktan Rajah, Keralaraja Azhivarmai
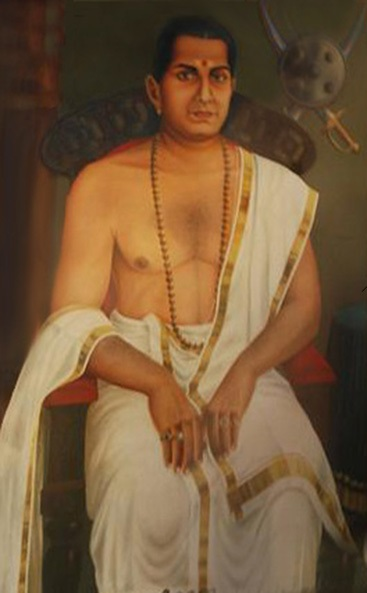
- Posthumous depiction of Pazhassi Raja by Raja Ravi Varma

Prince Of Padinjare Kovilakam Pazhassi and Raja of Kottayam
- Reign: 1773–1790 (Regent)
- Predecessor: Ravi Varma
- Successor: Himself
- Reign: 1790-1805
- Successor: Veera Varma
- Born: Kerala Varma; 3 January 1753; Pazhassi, near Mattannur, Kingdom of Kottayam (present-day Kannur district, Kerala, India)
- Died: 30 November 1805 (aged 52); Mavila Thod, near Pulpally,Mananthavady
- Burial: Mananthavady, Wayanad district, Kerala, India; 11.8017895°N 76.0008075°E
- Spouses: Kunjati of Avinyat, Makom of Kaitheri
- House: Padinjare Kovilakam
- Dynasty: Purannattukara Svarupam

Kerala Varma Pazhassi Raja (IPA: [pɐɻɐʃːi ɾaːd͡ʒɐ]) (3 January 1753 – 30 November 1805), also known as Cotiote Rajah and Pychy Rajah, was the de facto head of the Kottayam Kingdom (Note: anglicised as 'Cotiote'; not to be confused with present day region in central Kerala comprising the Kottayam district) in the Malabar region of Kerala between 1774 and 1805. His struggle against the British East India Company is known as the Cotiote War, for which he has been touted as one of the earliest freedom fighters in India. He earned the epithet "Kerala Simham" ("Lion of Kerala") on account of his martial exploits.

== Family ==
Pazhassi Raja was born into the Royal Padinjare Kovilakam (Western Branch) of the Purannattukara Swarupam, a royal lineage of Kottayam associated with place Puralimala or who ruled over the land of Purainad or Puralimala Nattukara. The family was also connected through the thaivazhi (maternal lineage) to the Kolathiri dynasty of the Mushika dynasty. The family traditionally incorporated the titles “Varma” or “Raja” into their names. They were historically classified as Samantan rank vassals similar to the Kolathiri and Zamorin below the Cochin–Perumpadappu Swarupam Samanthan Kshatriyas.

This branch was located at Pazhassi which lay south west of Mattannur. Kerala Varma got the name Pazhassi Raja as he was a native of Pazhassi. The early British East India Company documents wrote Pazhassi Raja as Pychy Rajah, while the name Cotiote Raja comes from the anglicizing of Kottayam to Cotiote. Kottayam covers what is today the Thalassery taluk of the Kannur District and Wayanad district, along with the Gudalur taluk(Mudhumalai, Nellakotta, Srimadurai,Cherambadi, and Masinagudi) of Nilgiris district.

As a royal clan, Purannattukara Swarupam had three branches: a western branch (Padinjare Kovilakam) at Pazhassi, near Mattannur, an eastern branch (Kizhakke Kovilakam) at Manatana, near Peravoor, and a southern branch (Tekke Kovilakam) at Kottayampoil, near Koothuparamba.

== Resistance to Mysore occupation (1773–1793) ==
Pazhassi Raja's warfare with Mysore troops can be divided into two phases based on the rulers of the kingdom of Mysore. First phase lasted from 1773 to 1782 during which time, the Mysore ruler was Hyder Ali. The second phase extended from 1784 to 1793 and during this phase he fought the troops of Tipu Sultan, son and successor of Hyder Ali.

=== Resistance to Hyder Ali (1773–1782) ===
In 1773, Hyder Ali marched into Malabar for the second time, for non-payment of tributes from the Rajas (kings) of Malabar as agreed after the war in 1768. Most of the Rajas of Malabar, along with many Naduvazhis or vassals fled to Travancore. Yet numerous princes and younger noblemen refused to flee and organized partisan bands who waged guerrilla warfare on the Mysore army from the forests and mountains that covered much of Malabar. Pazhassi Raja was one among them.

When Hyder Ali of the Kingdom of Mysore occupied Malabar in 1773, the Raja of Kottayam found political asylum in Kallara near Vaikom in Kottayam district of Kerala. Pazhassi Raja, the fourth prince in line for succession to the throne during this period, became one of the de facto heads of state, surpassing several older royal contenders. He fought a war of resistance against the Mysorean army from 1774 to 1793. On account of his refusal to flee and due to his effective resistance to Mysoreans, he gained firm support of his subjects.

In 1792, after the Third Anglo-Mysore War, the East India Company imposed control in Kottayam in violation of an earlier agreement of 1790 which had recognised its independence. Vira Varma, to whom Raja was a nephew, was appointed by the East India Company authorities as the Raja of Kottayam. To meet revenue targets fixed by Company authorities, Vira Varma ordered an exorbitant tax to be collected from the peasantry and this move was met in 1793 by a mass resistance led by Pazhassi Raja, who had always been opposed to the company's rule. In 1796, the company made an attempt to arrest Pazhassi Raja, but he evaded capture and instead fought back using guerilla warfare. After a string of serious setbacks, the Company sued for peace in 1797. The conflict was renewed in 1800 over a dispute on Wayanad and after a five-year-long war of insurgency, Pazhassi Raja was killed on 30 November 1805 in a gunfight at Mavila Thodu (small body of water), in the present-day Kerala-Karnataka border.

In 1774, at the age of 21, Pazhassi Raja took over the throne to replace his uncle who had fled to Travancore. He vowed to resist Hyder Ali's troops, and stayed in Kottayam, where he gathered a force and began guerrilla battles against the troops of Mysore as he had neither guns nor troops enough to face them in an open battle. He set up a large number of bases in the nearly impenetrable forested mountains of Puralimala and Wynad and repeatedly inflicted severe minor losses on the Mysore army in Kottayam as well as in Wayanad. Pazhassi Raja's troops were recruited from several castes and tribes- that includes Nair forces Nambiars, Thiyyas, Kurichiyas and Mullukurumas

Once the true Raja of Kottayam had fled, three royals rose to power in Kottayam. The nephew of the escaped Raja named Vira Varma and his nephews, Ravi Varma and Pazhassi Raja now took over the reins of government. Vira Varma was skilled in political intrigue and manipulation whereas Ravi Varma was too incompetent to play any serious political role and hence his role only was nominal. Pazhassi Raja become the most powerful figure in Kottayam, much to the chagrin of his uncle Vira Varma. Hence Vira Varma played a series of power games aiming to check the growing clout of his nephew. So the relation between Vira Varma and Pazhassi Raja was one of enmity right from the onset.

The military situation was grim for Pazhassi Raja and his troops – in 1774, Coorgs had joined hands with Hyder Ali on the promise of being gifted Wynad and a large Coorg army camped in Wynad to help Mysore troops. In 1776, Hyder Ali re-installed the Hindu Raja in Chirakkal and the latter joined Mysore war effort to crush Pazhassi Raja. This triple alliance which lasted till 1780 reached nowhere near defeating the Kottayam army.

During his long war with the Mysore and then the East India Company, Pazhassi Raja increased his sphere of influence significantly eastwards as far as the outskirts of Mysore. His men regularly looted enemy treasuries and sandalwood from southern Karnataka and his enemies could do little to check these raids. This enabled him to lay claim on a great chunk of the Mysore district – as far as Nanjangod in the east. Also, Pazhassi Raja and his men frequently raided the domains of neighbouring Rajas in northern Malabar and Coorg to harass the enemy regiments posted there and he was often supported by local population of those territories. Along with this, he had close ties with Ravi Varma and Krishna Varma, who were princes of Calicut and popular leaders of southern Malabar.

==== Siege of Thalasseri ====
Thalasseri or Tellicherry in the late 18th century was a harbour-fort which was held by the East India Company as a factory. The value of Tellicherry as a naval base meant that her capture could seriously impact the situation of the Bombay Marine on the west coast. Also rebels in North Malabar bought arms and ammunition from the East India Company in Tellicherry. So if Hyder could capture this fort, he could, at a stroke, cripple both the rebels in North Malabar as well as Company rule in India at a regional basis.

So in 1778, Hyder's vassal, the Raja of Chirakkal, besieged Thalasseri and enforced an economic blockade under order from Hyder himself. The East India Company factories at Talassery armed Pazhassi Raja's men to enable them to recover Kottayam from the Mysorean occupation army. This move by the Company ensured that the Chirakkal army was now at risk of being struck in the rear by Pazhassi Raja's force. The Chirakkal troops began to retreat, but Pazhassi chased and devastated the Chirakkal army, and then marched to Kottayam where he obliterated the Mysorean occupation and overran all of western Kottayam. But at this critical moment when the Mysorean army in Malabar could have been destroyed by a joint action on the part of the Company and the Rajas, their factories at Talassery were instructed by the Governor not to upset the nominal peace with Hyder.

Thus the EIC decision not to exploit the victory at Thalasseri was exploited by Mysore. The Chirakkal army reinforced by a Mysorean contingent under Balwant Rao marched into Kottayam. Pazhassi's men, though secretly supplied with arms and ammunition by the company, could not hold or defeat this huge host and soon the Kottayam army was forced to disperse after a fight. Then the Mysore-Chirakkal army captured Kadathanad and installed a puppet Raja who joined hands with Mysore. In 1779, a huge Mysore-Chirakkal-Kadathanad army besieged Thalasseri. Pazhassi Raja sent a force of 2000 Nairs to aid the EIC defence of Thalassery, and this enabled the factories to hold on successfully.

By the end of 1779, Sardar Khan, the Mysorean general was sent to Thalasseri to bring the siege speedily to a successful conclusion. Sardar Khan came with a force of 10,000 troops and 30 heavy guns. Sardar Khan knew that it was Pazhassi Raja's help that enabled the East India Company to resist him and so he opened negotiations with Pazhassi – his offer was the restoration of Mysore occupied territories of Kottayam if Pazhassi would ally himself with Mysore and pay an immediate tribute of 500,000 rupees. It was well beyond the capacity of Kottayam to raise so huge a sum in so short a time. But Pazhassi did his best to pay Sardar Khan [probably in the hope that the latter would make concessions] and 60,000 rupees was paid to the latter. But Khan was not satisfied and rejected Pazhassi's request that his possessions in Malabar be restored. This greedy and tactless approach of Sardar Khan's made sure that there was little chance for Mysore to capture Thalasseri. The Kottayam army became far stronger with their major victory in 1779 at Kalpetta (Wynad) where the whole Coorg army of 2,000 was surrounded and decimated by Pazhassi Raja's troops. The destruction of the Coorg army in Wynad enabled Raja to throw a whole new army into the contest at Thalasseri.

In 1780, Pazhassi Raja proposed a plan to the East India Company to break the Mysorean siege of Thalassery: he and his men would strike the enemy in the rear from the east as the EIC came out of the fort and struck the Mysorean line in front. Both armies would effect a junction that would split the enemy into two. The Mysorean and allied troops could then be routed easily. But it was only in 1781 that the Company understood the value of this plan and their Bombay authorities agreed to it. An operation was carried out as per Pazhassi's plan; it ended with the destruction of the Mysorean forces. What followed was a rebellion in Kottayam by the Nair militia led by Pazhassi Raja. Soon, the Mysoreans were ousted.

Map of the Malabar Province 1809, after the death of Pazhassi Raja

=== Rebellion to remove Tipu Sultan (1784–1793) ===
By 1782, Kottayam was once more a free land. But by the Treaty of Mangalore (1784) after the Second Anglo-Mysore War, the Company administration recognised Tipu Sultan's sphere of authority in Malabar. Thus with its only valuable ally lost, Kottayam was ready to become a vassal state of Mysore. Once more, as Sardar Khan did in 1779, Mysore exacted an exorbitant rate of tribute. Although Ravi Varma, the elder brother of Pazhassi Raja agreed to pay 65,000 rupees per year, Mysore demanded 81,000 rupees. The hiked rate of tribute meant greater hardship for the peasantry (largely Thiyyar) who had suffered from years of foreign occupation. So Pazhassi Raja took up this issue and decided to launch a mass resistance struggle once more.

What angered Pazhassi Raja even more was that his brother Ravi Varma who paid a visit to Tipu Sultan in 1786 for peace talks was forced to sign a treaty which ceded Wayanad to Tipu Sultan. Pazhassi Raja decided not to let Tipu enjoy Wayanad in peace and kept up a guerrilla warfare that constantly harassed Mysore troops in Wayanad and its neighbourhood. War in Wayanad lasted for seven years – till 1793 – when the last of the Mysorean garrisons were expelled from the soil of Wayanad.

By the end of 1788, Pazhassi Raja's hatred of Tipu had shot up on account of the latter's policy of forcible conversion. So he strengthened his ties with the East India Company on one hand and with fellow rebel chiefs and princes in Malabar on the other. Tipu sent an army under a French general named Lally with a genocidal mission—the extermination of the Nair caste from Kottayam to Palakkad – as Tipu was determined to end the menace of Nair rebels in Malabar who had foiled all attempts of him and his late father Hyder Ali to subjugate and exploit Malabar.

The senior Rajah of Kottayam fled to Travancore fearing the Sultan. But before that, he handed over charge of government to Pazhassi Raja and asked him to save the country from Mysore's onslaught. Given below is the observation made by historian Rajayyan about Pazhassi Raja's resistance to Tipu Sultan after the exodus of Rajas from Malabar in 1788:

Between 1787 and 1788, the thampurans or Rajahs of Malabar, threatened by the forces of Tipu, fled to Travancore. Among them were the princes of Kottayathu.....The Senior Rajah before his flight summoned Kerala Varma, the youngest prince, and instructed him to protect the country. Accordingly, the latter assembled the inhabitants, retired to the jungles and assisted them in the development of a new homeland. Frequently, in defiance to the authority of the Sultan, he with a band of determined followers issued forth from the woods and levied contributions.

But in 1790, Tipu abandoned the war in Malabar as the war in Deccan drew his attention. Pazhassi Raja joined the East India Company with a force of 1500 Nairs to capture the Mysorean stronghold in Katirur (near Talassery). After Katirur, Pazhassi Raja and his troops moved south-east and captured the Kuttiyadi fort from Tipu's men. Thus once more, the whole of Kottayam was under the control of Pazhassi Raja. In 1790, the Company recognised Pazhassi Raja as the head of Kottayam instead of the original Raja who was in refuge at Travancore. Raja agreed to pay 25,000 rupees as tribute to the company. But his struggle with the Mysore troops continued in Wayanad till 1793 when he freed that land also.

But by the Treaty of Seringapatam (1792) signed between the EIC and Tipu after the latter failed in Third Anglo-Mysore War, Malabar was ceded to the EIC. The East India Company then began to work for the establishment of their supremacy in Malabar. This was where the Company administration and Pazhassi Raja had opposite opinions – Pazhassi Raja helped the East India Company not because he was ready to accept Company rule but because he wanted his country Kottayam to be an independent land.

Pazhassi Raja was disturbed when he heard about the terms which the Company put forward to the Rajas of Malabar in 1792, because the EIC had signed a cowl with him in 1790 which promised to respect the independence of Kottayam. The summary of the East India Company terms in 1792 were as follows:

- The Raja to be able to rule as before, but the East India Company to control him "in case of oppressing inhabitants".
- A resident to be appointed to enquire about "complaints of oppression".
- Two persons on the part of the company and two persons on the part of the Raja to make valuation of the land revenue of Kottayam.
- The tax to be paid by each subject to be ascertained.
- The Raja's tribute to be settled in October 1792 according to the appearance of crop.
- The EIC share of the pepper to be delivered at a price fixed by their administration in December 1792.
- The remainder of the pepper to be bought only by merchants appointed by the company.

These terms converted monarchs to mere agents of the East India Company. Rajas were now stripped of their right to rule as they willed; they also lost control over their economies.

Kottayam was represented by Vira Varma, uncle of Pazhassi Raja during talks with the East India Company in 1792. Vira Varma concluded a treaty with Company = by which he accepted all terms and conditions put forward by them.

== Resistance to Company rule in India — the Cotiote War ==
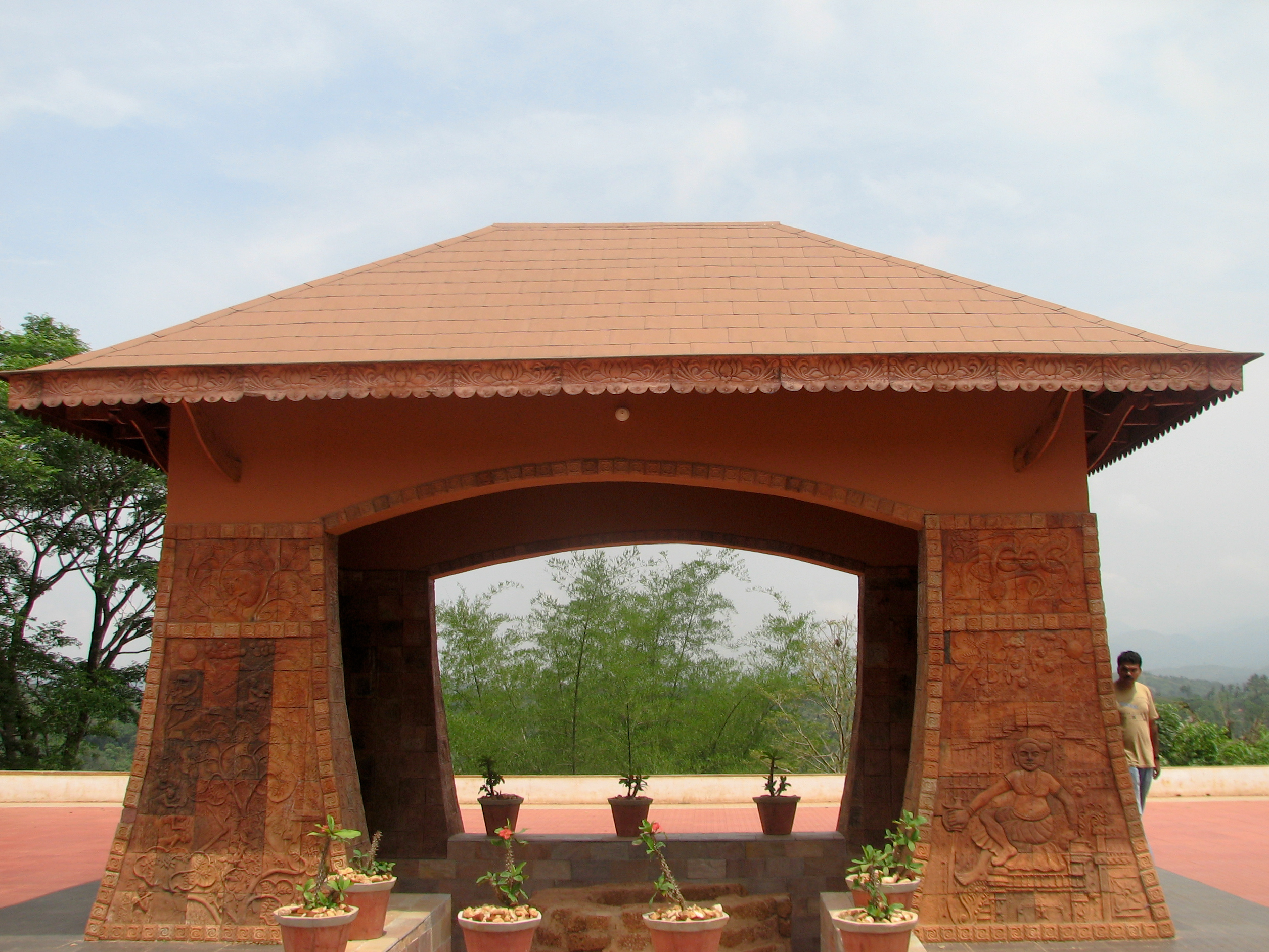
Pazhassi Kudeeram-a memorial for Pazhassi Raja at his burial spot in Mananthavadi, Wayanad, Kerala, designed by Architect Eugene Pandala

Pazhassi Raja resisted the East India Company from 1793 onwards till his death in 1805. He fought two wars to resist Company intervention in the domestic affairs of his kingdom. From 1793 to 1797 he fought over the question of the management of Kottayam and from 1800 to 1805 over the issue of who was to be master of Wynad. The East India Company called their wars with Pazhassi Rajah as Cotiote War.

=== First revolt (1793–1797) ===
Pazhassi Raja was not on good terms with his uncle Vira Varma, Raja of Kurumbranad. In 1793, foxy Vira Varma who had surrendered Kottayam to the EIC back in 1792, convinced Company commissioners to let him collect tax in Kottayam. He calculated that a good collection might please the EIC and that they would let him seize all of Kottayam. The company had by this time adopted a hostile approach to Pazhassi Raja who had consistently refused to accept Company suzerainty and hence they made the obedient Vira Varma head of Kottayam Pazhassi Raja was angry at this move. He felt betrayed. After all, he was the only Raja in Northern Malabar to have helped the East India Company consistently in the war with Mysore.

Vira Varma Raja, on the one hand, undertook to collect tax in Kottayam directly, but on the other hand, he encouraged Pazhassi Raja to oppose the company's domination. Moreover, the tax imposed by the company was beyond the peasants' capacity to pay. They resisted attempts to collect these taxes by the agents of the East India Company, and Pazhassi Raja took up their cause.

In 1793 Pazhassi Raja made sure that no tax was collected in Kottayam by the EIC – as a mark of his protest. He also threatened that if Company officials did not give up their enumeration of pepper vines, he would have the vines destroyed. Local Company authorities, however, debated with Raja and soon both discovered Vira Varma's deceptions. The East India Company put forward a solution acceptable to the Raja by which 20 percent of gross revenue would go to Raja and another 20 percent would go for temple expenses. No tax would be imposed on temple property in the immediate future.

In 1793 Tipu's Vakils protested to the Company that Pazhassi Raja, who was an EIC subsidiary, had overrun most of Wayanad. Soon the Raja was supreme in the Wayanad Plateau.

But the Governor General unwisely revoked the agreement in 1794 and gave Kottayam to Vira Varma, the Kurumbranad Raja on a five-year lease. The Raja was very angry at this decision and decided to retaliate by ruling his country as per customary law. The year before the lease was concluded the Raja had provided asylum to a Nair noble, Narangoli Nambiar of the Iruvazinad royal clan, who had been declared an outlaw by the East India Company for the murder of three men who had killed his kinsman. The Raja's kind treatment of Nambiar irritated the EIC. The EIC also became angry that the Raja had executed by impalement two robbers as per customary law. The Company planned to arrest Raja 'for murder' but gave up the idea as the Raja had a bodyguard of 500 well-armed Wayanad Nairs.

In 1795, after a year, Vira Varma Raja got Kottayam on lease but was not able to collect tax there due to the efforts of his nephew Raja. So East India Company troops arrived in Kottayam to help Vira Varma's tax collectors, but Pazhassi Raja's men resisted them with success.

In 1796 orders were issued from Bombay to collect tax arrears for 2 years in Kottayam. For the Company administration, no more pretexts were needed to arrest the Raja. 300 men under Lieutenant James Gordon marched from Talassery and seized the Raja's fortified house at Pazhassi-but the Raja fled four days earlier to Manattana (near Kottiyur). Gordon sacked the palace where traditional treasure of the Raja was kept. The Raja was angry at Gordon's actions and sent a letter to the Supervisor at Thalassery.

The Raja was also angry that one of his former generals, named Pazhayamviden Chandu, had become an agent of Kurumbranad Raja and what angered him even more was that this turncoat had the audacity to boss him with Vira Varma's and EIC blessings. The Raja shifted his HQ to Purali Range and then into Wayanad. The Raja then blocked all Company communications between Wayanad and Low Malabar through Kuttiyadi Pass. The EIC retaliated by cutting all communications between the Raja and Low Malabar. But as they did not have enough troops to chase him they waited for reinforcements.

The East India Company commandant was Colonel Dow, who the Raja knew well from the Siege of Thalassery. The Raja thought that this old friend might help him mediate with the Company administration. Raja offered to give up the struggle provided he was pardoned and his treasure and house restored. The Colonel and the Raja being old soldiers in arms hated needless bloodshed, so he forwarded the Raja's request to the Commissioners, who though they were bitterly opposed to the Raja's independent style, agreed to the Colonel's request as there was a risk that the Raja might ally with Tipu.

So Northern Superintendent ordered the restoration of the Raja's house [but not treasure], and the Raja's pardon was confirmed by the Bombay and Supreme Governments. But the orders of government were communicated to the Raja via Vira Varma – which meant that the uncle Raja took care not to report to his nephew that the company had agreed to his requests. Uncle Raja had a vested interest in the war between the company and his nephew Pazhassi Raja.

Vira Varma also removed Kaitheri Ambu, a favourite noble and general of Raja, from home administration of Kottayam. Ambu along with followers went to Kannavam [also spelled Kannavath and Kannoth], where he planned and executed a mass resistance with people's support, which made sure that Vira Varma could make no tax collection in Kottayam. Ambu clearly acted under the guidance of the Pazhassi Raja, who felt the expulsion of Ambu was another of his uncle's conspiracies to undermine him.

The Raja feared that the East India Company planned to seize him [not knowing that their truce terms were kept blocked from him by his uncle] and retreated into the depths of Wayanad. Company troop build-up in Wayanad also amplified his doubts. However, the Raja was still eager to avoid a war and came to meet the Northern Superintendent with a bodyguard of 1500 armed Nairs. Vira Varma Raja was also ordered to be present. Pazhassi Raja's main demand was that Kottayam must be under his rule, a demand to which his uncle was not ready to accede.

The EIC Commissioners' attitude also was arrogant; they were already prejudiced against Raja and were therefore blind towards Raja's logical argument that Vira Varma had no business in Kottayam. As talks broke down, the Commissioners' issued a proclamation in Kottayam that if those Kottayam men in service of Raja did not desert him and come home, they would be declared enemies and their properties confiscated. But this proclamation had little effect in Kottayam where resistance to Company-Kurumbranad rule became stronger.

The East India Company, to their horror, found out that a large number of Vira Varma's troops had deserted to join ranks of insurgents and Vira Varma himself was not much interested to help the company; after all his aim was to create a flare-up between his nephew and the EIC for sake of pure self-interest.

Raja then visited the Mysorean commandant at Karkankotta in 1796 and in 1797 held an audience with his old enemy Tipu in Mysore, who posted 6000 men at Karkankotta to aid Raja in case of war and to supply ammunition to rebels. He also began to collect troops and armaments. War was imminent. 1200 troops and artillery under a Major General was sent by the Bombay Government to deal with Pazhassi. The company also began to set up outposts in Kottayam and sent more troops to Wayanad.

In early 1797, the Nair militia uprose all over Kottayam and Company outposts were trapped in a true state of siege. Partisan bands became active all over Kottayam and harassed reinforcements and supply convoys. The case was similar in Wayanad where East India Company troops that moved out of the safety of their garrisons risked being harried by Kurichia bowmen. The EIC suffered a good deal of loss in terms of men, ammunition and stores in these ambuscades.

==== Victory at Periya Pass ====
This event was the most important in the whole war. In 1797, Colonel Dow & force marched into Wayanad. His plan was to block Periya Pass and then crush a large rebel force in Kannoth once their retreat is blocked.

Reinforcements under Lieutenant Mealy were to reach Dow at Periya, but on way they were severely harassed by a force of Nayars and Kurichias and suffered a casualty of 105 men. So instead of Periya they retreated to their original base.

Dow's troops suffered chronic shortage of supplies and so Dow applied for reinforcements and re-supplies to be sent under Major Anderson of Bowles' regiment. But as Mappila guides of Anderson deserted at last moment. That caused a delay in journey of Anderson-a delay that had fatal consequence for the EIC.

Dow then received news that Tipu had sent sepoys to aid Raja as Tipu considered the Company entry into Wayanad a violation of Seringapatam Pact. Dow decided that he will go to Talassery to consult authorities there and to plan a greater operation to deal with troops of the Raja and Tipu simultaneously in Wayanad. He left with a small band of men but was ambushed on way by the Raja's men aided by Mysorean sepoys but Dow escaped unhurt.

The day after he left, an EIC force of 1100 under Major Cameroon in Periya decided to descend into Kottayam via Periya Pass as their supplies were exhausted.

But what they did not know was that the Raja who learned of the true state of the Company expeditionary force laid a trap for them - he ordered troops lay concealed in camouflaged stockades built on both sides of the pass. Once the whole Company force entered the narrow pass, hidden troops were to pounce on their enemy who would be caught unawares.

The plan worked well and what followed was a great slaughter of the Company force. Had it not been for the arrival of Major Anderson's force the following day, hardly any would have survived due to lack of medical care. Most of the enemy were killed and all their guns, ammunition, baggage and cattle were plundered along with Union colours. Senior Company officers like Major Cameron, Lieutenant Nugent, Lieutenant Madge, and Lieutenant Rudderman were killed in action.

Around this time, Commissioners took a decision on the advice of Swaminatha Pattar, a Tamil Brahmin who was the minister of Zamorin that sowed the eventual downfall of Pazhassi Raja. They decided to raise an irregular force of local traitors to harass Pazhassi Raja. This force was a forerunner of the Kolkar, who became hated because of their support of the company and cruelty to resisters and people.

But for time being, the Raja was in a strong position. On account of the disasters suffered by their army, Bombay Government sent a Committee of Government composed of men of highest ranks-Commander-In-Chief Lieutenant-General Stuart and Governor Jonathan Duncan. They decided to make peace as they were anxious that guerrilla warfare in a mountainous and forested terrain could last long and that Raja might join forces with Tipu or French. They also decided that Kurumbranad Raja Vira Varma should be ousted from administration of Kottayam. Rajas of Chirakkal and Parappanad acted as mediators in negotiation between Raja and the East India Company and a peace pact was signed between Pazhassi and the Company in 1797.

The Treaty of 1797 agreed on following points:

- Pazhassi Raja was to be 'pardoned'.
- He would be returned his treasure.
- He would be provided an annual allowance of 8000 rupees.
- He would be given back his confiscated house at Pazhassi.
- Ravi Varma, elder brother of Pazhassi Raja would be head of Kottayam.

A pardon and restoration of property was also extended to Narangoli Nambiar of Iruvazinad.

Thus the Raja's efforts of four years ended in a political victory. Peace dawned after four years of antagonism and war.

Tipu Sultan in his letter to French government notes with glee that East India Company had lost 1,000 European soldiers and 3,000 native sepoys in four years of war between the Presidency armies and Kottayam army.

=== Undeclared hostilities (1797–1800) ===
Despite the peace treaty of 1797, real peace did not emerge between Pazhassi Raja and the East India Company. Skirmishes continued across Kottayam. The main reason for this was that the Company did not attempt to end its efforts to annex Kottayam and collect tax. But this was successfully foiled by partisans of Pazhassi Raja headed by Kaitheri Ambu. Pazhassi Raja also went ahead with his policy of defiance of East India Company directions, continued with his military enlargement program and even shifted his seat of power to Mananthavadi in Wayanad – all of which were deemed as "injurious to interests of Company in Kottayam" by Colonel Dow, the Company representative in Kottayam. But since Raja clearly had the upper hand since the victory of 1797, the East India Company was powerless to put an end to his activities.

=== Second revolt and death (1800–1805) ===
After the fall of Tipu, Wayanad fell to the East India Company. They sent a Mysore Commission to seize Wayanad and planned to annex it to either Canara or Coimbatore. But as Wayanad was a traditional possession of Kottayam Raja and Pazhassi had been in control of this region since 1793, Pazhassi interpreted the move as an encroachment on his country's ancient provinces. Raja retaliated by collecting a large force of Nairs which was now supplemented by Mappilas and Pathans, latter being ex-soldiers of Tipu who became unemployed after Tipu's death.

The Company administration at Madras appointed Major General Arthur Wellesley as the Presidency army commandant of Mysore, Canara & Malabar.

He planned a double-pronged move from Malabar Coast and Mysore into Wayanad and began preparations for that end. Raja observed Major General - the latter had brought reinforcements and was building roads in Wayanad and outposts across rebel country. In response, the Raja also recruited numerous men which so alarmed Wellesley that he even wanted to kidnap kith and kin of rebels so as to check Raja's recruitment.

Raja learned that Wellesley had left for the Deccan on a military mission - the Raja who understood that Major General's absence is a great chance swiftly made his move. He marched across Kuttiyadi Pass and below he made a junction with Unni Mootha Mooppan, a Walluvanad Mappila leader & his men and soon several great nobles like Kampuratt Nambiar of Iruvazhinad, Peruvayal Nambiar and Kannavath Sankaran Nambiar also joined Raja with their men.

By monsoon of 1800, rebels who controlled all of country-side of Kottayam threatened to overwhelm Company outposts in Kottayam. Wellesley sent a large force under Colonel Sartorius to recapture rebel-held Kottayam. But the plan could not be carried out as there were not enough troops in Malabar. Wellesley advised Commissioners to stop all communications with Wayanad so as to starve Raja of supplies. But the shortage of troops also meant this plan too remained on paper. By the time, Wellesley decided to smash Raja by a double drive from Malabar Coast and Mysore into Wayanad, Manjeri Athan Gurikkal an Ernad Mappila leader along with his followers agreed to support of Raja.

By 1801, a large East India Company force of over 10,000 men swarmed all over Kottayam and Wayanad and they blocked all passes that linked Wayanad with Malabar. Before so large numbers, rebels thought wise to go under-ground for time being. Raja also found that he could no longer contact his supporters in Southern Wayanad and Southern Malabar. Raja became a wanderer in forests but even then, to surprise of the East India Company, he ruled out compromise it seems he understood that there was no alternative to full freedom.

Raja had six close aides and 25 musketeers in his wanderings. First, he went north via Payyavur along montane forests of eastern Chirakkal to rally support. But the EIC were on his trail but failed to catch him. Raja then visited his secret bases in Kottayam and then moved into Kadathanad and into jungles of Kurumbranad. The East India Company were angered that where ever he went, nobles supported him in secret and decided to punish them for their help to rebel Raja.

As a part of their policies to quell the rebellion, Peruvayal Nambiar who was arrested was hanged. The East India Company also threatened to issue a penalty and confiscation of property for all those rebels who failed to surrender in six weeks time. But a pardon was also issued for surrendered rebels. But none of these threats and temptations worked and Raja was still at large. But some of his chief supporters were arrested of whom Kannavath Sankaran Nambiar was most famous. Kannavath Sankaran Nambiar and his son were hanged too and their property was confiscated.

Following execution of Kannavath Nambiar, a deceptive calm descended on North Malabar-calm before the storm. Collector Major MacLeod believed that war was over and went ahead with his charged duties. He immediately declared total disarmament of Malabar and threatened those who kept arms with the death penalty. He also doubled the rate of tax and ordered a reassessment of tax of whole Malabar in a mere forty days.

All these 'reforms' paid back in 1803 when Malabar was on verge of revolt as people quickly became incensed. MacLeod tried to calm this with corrective measure-He cancelled all his 'reforms' and old system was reinstated. But it was too late for Wayanad where Raja's men were prepared for a rebellion.

==== Capture of Panamaram Fort ====
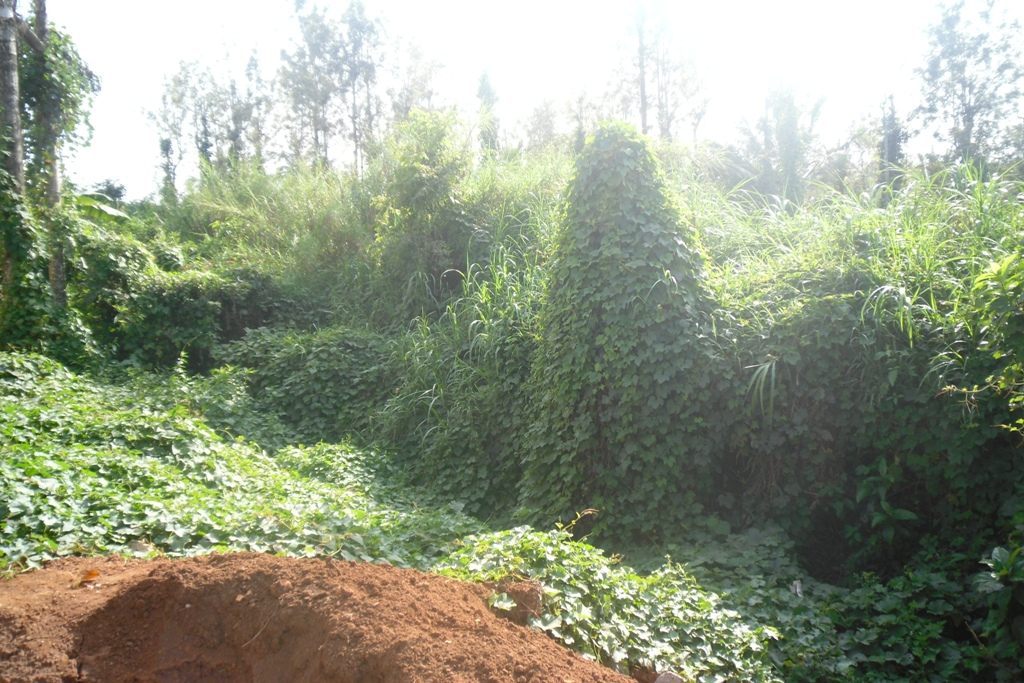
Remains of the Moat surrounded the Panamaram fort. Now it is almost covered with creepers and bushes, Panamaram, Wayanad, Kerala.

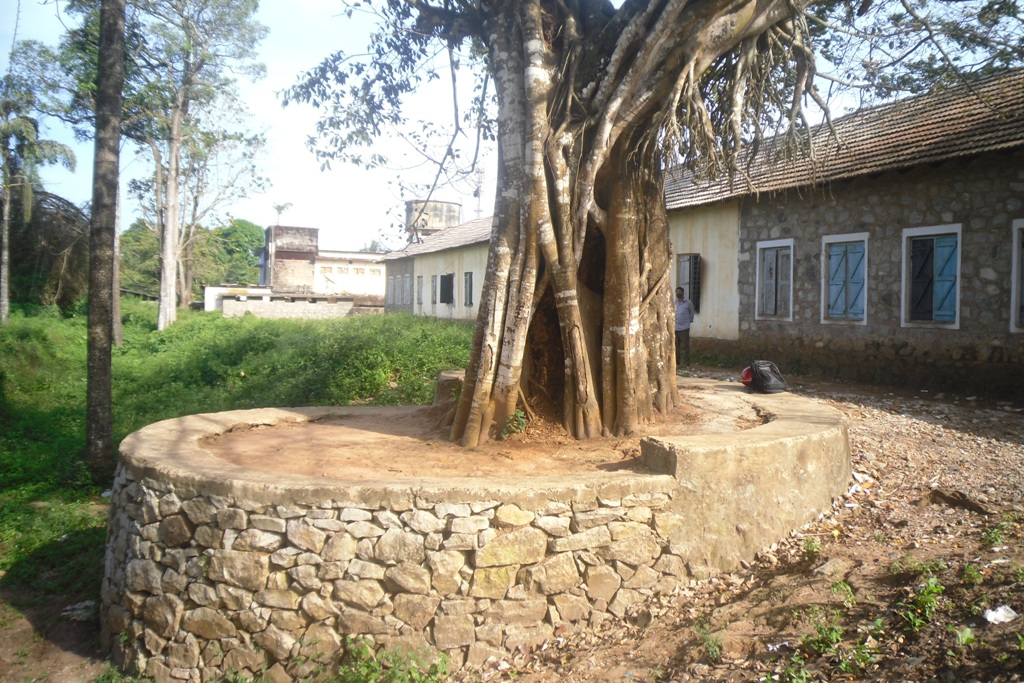
Koli tree near the Panamaram fort. Talakkal Chandu was executed somewhere near this tree., Panamaram, Wayanad, Kerala.

The first major event was the capture of Panamaram Fort. Edachena Kungan who planned the operation and was helped by 150 Kurichia bowmen under Talakkal Chandu. Fort had 70 men under Captain Dickenson and there was a large force of 360 men under Major Drummond only a few miles away in Pulinjali. So if the Major came to help Captain Dickenson in time Kurichia force would be overwhelmed by gun-fire and numbers. Kungan and Chandu decided to take risk.

The whole garrison was slaughtered in the surprise attack led by the two generals and they lost only 5 dead and 10 wounded. Dickenson himself was killed. Rebels got 112 muskets, six boxes of ammunition and 6000 rupees. They also destroyed the whole fort.(The remains of the fort can be seen now near Panamaram High School).

Wellesley was enraged at this rebel audacity and dispatched 500 men to retaliate. But by then rebel victory had roused all of Wayanad and Kottayam. Edachena Kungan, the hero of Panamaram success, went to Pulpally shrine and issued a proclamation to people to join Raja's war. 3000 men volunteered. They were posted at Valliyurkav at Mananthavadi, Motimjarra [?], and Edappally and 100 of them under the brother of Kungan posted themselves at Periya Pass and 25 men were posted at Kottiyur Pass. Rebel outposts were set up en route from Dindimal to Valliyurkav. The rebel army was mostly composed of archers and swordsmen, but some had muskets.

Edachena Kungan led an attack on a Company detachment headed from Mysore to Mananthavadi. The harassment began once this force entered Wayanad till it reached a stream between Manathavadi and Bhavully river. There they were blocked by a rebel force entrenched on the opposite side of the stream. But to ill luck of rebels, a reinforcement which had caught up with blocked Company army outflanked the rebel entrenchment and took a large number of prisoners of war.

Besides, East India Company reinforcements arrived in Wayanad from all directions. But they could find rebels nowhere.

The rebels now concentrated in Kottayam. In 1802, they raided a supplies convoy near Kottiyur. The Company administration were frustrated by Kottayam people's total lack of co-operation. To add to their trouble, in 1803, a rebel force took to field in Kurumbranad* & Payyormala* and people were sympathetic to rebels. Kungan marched towards Pazhassi to wipe out the Company outpost there but had to retreat, though they suffered serious losses. Soon rebellion spread into Chirakkal where armed bands of partisans launched operations and often fought against the Presidency troops openly. The Raja's army by end of 1803 was ranging as far as Kannur and Thalasseri. An estimated 3350 partisans of Pazhassi Raja took part in this operation that extended south as far as Ernad.

In March 1803, a rebel force marched as far as Calicut and captured Sub-Jail where they killed all guards and seized their firearms and ammunition. They also released prisoners, many of whom joined ranks of the rebel army. This was too much for MacLeod and he resigned immediately after this event.

In 1803, Wellesley, later destined to become Duke of Wellington, and the vanquisher of Napoleon at Waterloo, left for Europe, after three years of inconclusive war with Pazhassi Raja, .

In 1803, the East India Company had 8,147 soldiers to fight Pazhassi Raja. But as the situation was slipping out of control, the EIC military command in Malabar requested for another 5,000 men. This reinforcement arrived in early 1804 and thus increasing their total force to 13,000 men.

In 1804, a large Presidency army arrived and 1200 Kolkar were also ready for action. Most importantly Thomas Hervey Baber, a civil servant was appointed as Sub-Collector. It was he who crushed Pazhassi's Revolt forever. It is indeed ironic that what a military genius like Wellesley could not attain, was achieved by Baber – said to be just a 'civil servant.' Baber had both a personal motive – to avenge the death of his friend Major Cameron, the first husband of his wife Helen Somerville Fearon at the hand of Pazhassi Raja on 9 January 1797 at Periya Pass. Baber became a civil servant to protect the interests of a small but influential group of merchants that included his in-laws – the Inglis and Money families of Bombay. It is noteworthy that Baber's son Henry Fearon Baber married the Granddaughter of George Harris, 1st Baron Srirangapattam and the nemesis of Tipu Sultan.

In 1804, a huge rising led by Kalyat Nambiar [a powerful Chirakkal noble but Raja's sympathiser] and Raja's men in largely forested eastern Chirakkal was defeated by the company. If there was large and long revolt warfare in Chirakkal, it would have immensely profited Raja. Though there was a lot of supporters of Raja in Chirakkal, as revolt collapsed fast as rebels opted for open confrontation instead of time-honoured guerrilla warfare. Another cause for the failure of revolt was treacherous Kolkar also served their White pay-masters well.

So once more rebel force had retreated to Wayanad. They were hotly chased by East India Company who had 2000 Sepoys and 1000 allied Kolkars. A reward of 3000 pagodas was offered for Raja along with 1000 Pagodas for Edachena Kungan and bounties were put on heads of 10 other associates of Raja.

But rebels, mostly Kurumbas, struck at Churikunji [?] in Wayanad. Though they had to withdraw, they had devastated their enemy. That year, a party of Kolkar nearly caught Raja but he escaped thanks to timely warning of a Kurumba guard.

But monsoon and brutal climate of Wayanad soon aided Raja. Of 1300 Kolkar only 170 were not sick by October. The Raja and Edachena Kungan organised a large force of Kurichias and Kurumbas at Pulpally shrine and positioned them to as far as Kurichiyat. Also, the effort of Kungan to rally Nair nobles of Wayanad to support Raja's war-effort had also succeeded.

The EIC for past couple of years did not have to suffer the loss on a scale of Periya in 1797, but matters were not easy for the Company at all. Even in Kottayam which had become quiet might explode once more and a large rebel force with Raja as the head was still at large. But one must remember that the whole revolt is a one-man show as Wellesley himself remarked once-“We are not fighting 1000 men [Raja's army] ... but one man ... Kerala Varma.”-Raja's end would mean end of revolt.

==== Betrayal and death ====
T.H. Baber went to Mysore to direct operations himself and began a large search for informants and traitors. The East India Company themselves admitted that they did not get a lot of informants as locals were devoted to Raja, but some of those few informants proved devastating to revolt-one of them a Chetti, found out where Raja had camped and informed Baber who took to field with 100 Kolkar and 50 Sepoys.

There is one school of thought that blames Pazhayamviden Chandu as solely responsible for the fall of Raja and the end of his revolt. Pazhayamviden worked with the East India Company administration as an "advisor" like Pallore Eman and was a spy for Raja. But in the autumn of 1805 Pazhayamviden decided to betray his king and divulged military secrets for a large sum of money.

In light of the above points, it will not be far-fetched to believe that Chetti who guided Company troops to Raja's hideout mentioned by Baber in his letter could be a servant or agent of Pazhayamviden Chandu.

On 30 November 1805, the Raja and retainers were camped close to Karnataka on the shore of a stream named Mavila or Mavila Tod [not far from Pulpally]. The Raja and his party were caught by surprise and an intense but short fight followed. Six fighters were killed. One of the earliest fighter to be killed was Pazhassi Raja.

But evidently, wounded Raja did live long enough for a few more minutes to raise his loaded gun and then tell Canara Menon, an East India Company minor official, not to come too close to his dying body and pollute it.

The precise nature of Raja's death is controversial. Folklore insists that he committed suicide by swallowing a diamond ring to avoid capture after he was wounded but Baber says he was killed by a clerk named Canara Menon. W. J. Wilson, who wrote on the history of the Madras Regiment, credits Captain Clafam and his six sepoys for killing. This third version is more likely as Baber was not on good terms with military authority throughout the war. He is alleged to have credited Menon so as to deny credit to Clafam and his superior Colonel Hill.

Kunjani, the wife of Raja who was taken the prisoner, committed suicide in captivity at Kappanaveedu, near Thalassery. As reprisal on his family, property was confiscated and the palace at Pazhassi was demolished and replaced with a highway. The sorry state of his family aroused sympathy in local Thiyyas, who were loyal followers and built a new house for his family.

== Assessment ==
...but in all classes, I observed a decided interest for the Pyche Raja, towards whom the inhabitants entertained regard and respect bordering on veneration, which not even his death can efface.

— Thomas Harvey Baber, 1805

- Descriptive account of Pazhassi Raja as early as 1775 confirm his later day image as a courageous warrior committed to the freedom of his country.
- Walter Ivor, a member of Court of Directors, who had taken part in negotiations with Pazhassi Raja in 1797 notes that Company losses that year in Cotiote War exceeded their losses in Third Anglo-Mysore War.
- War waged by Pazhassi Raja was the longest insurgency against the Company in Indian history and forest warfare waged by Raja had no parallel in the history of India in late eighteenth and early nineteenth century India.
- The Company military command always wondered at the logistics of Raja's army. How he organized supplies for his several thousand strong armies remained a puzzle for them
- To fight overwhelmingly superior enemies, Raja imparted military training to his peasantry wholesale and recruited them into his military force. This military policy of wholesale militarization was novel in the history of pre-modern Kerala. His war-effort was marked by the participation of members of all creeds, classes, and castes who took up arms due to his inspiration. Nobles, headmen, peasants, shopkeepers, merchants, artisans, and forest tribes rallied to fight in his campaigns — first against the Kingdom of Mysore and later the East India Company.
- East India Company losses were severe in terms of men and ran into several thousand. Death toll was particularly high with officers of commissioned ranks. So high were the losses suffered by Bombay army regiments that operated in North Malabar that they had to be withdrawn in 1803 fearing that further losses would cripple Bombay Army as a respectable body of troops.
- Raja shared all the privations of his ordinary soldiers during the war and took part in all major military action exposing himself to personal danger. On account of these attributes, he commanded great respect of his troops.
- Royal regiments from Britain also took part in Cotiote War along with Company troops.
- Anti-British fighters in Tamil Nadu and Karnataka also were allied to Pazhassi Raja.
- Arthur Wellesley, later Duke of Wellington, adopted methods of guerrilla warfare used by Pazhassi Raja to defeat Napoleon's armies in Spain.
- Memory of Pazhassi Raja and his struggle inspired freedom struggle in 20th century Kerala.

Swaminatha Iyer, a Company agent had noted as early as 1797 that extreme popularity of Raja was because he remained in his country with his subjects during Mysore invasions and shared with them the trials and tribulations and also due to his extreme generosity to this peasantry. It was on account of love and support from his subjects that Raja could evade and fight the East India Company for a decade even when he had a bounty on his head.

After his fellow Rajas in Malabar submitted to East India Company after 1798, Raja himself knew well that he will be defeated and killed in the long run if he chose to continue to fight against the East India Company. But yet he refused to compromise. In a letter to Kalyat Kuttieman, he revealed his intent to resist the company's authority to the end.

He took initiative to rebuild his country which was devastated by Mysore invasions. As part of this, he borrowed money from Tellicherry Factory and gave financial help to his peasants to resume agriculture along with distribution of seeds and cattle. This was in contrast to rest of Rajas of Malabar who squeezed peasants. This was one reason why his popularity with masses remained high.

Raja is also credited with the spread of agriculture in Wayanad. He started a program that encouraged tribesmen in Wayanad to adopt settled agriculture. As part of this program, he instructed his vassals in Wayanad to distribute cattle and seeds to tribesmen in Wayanad.

== Supporters ==
Pazhassi Raja was assisted by eighty chieftains during his wars and some were entrusted with administrative responsibilities also. Most prominent of them are Chengoteri Chathu, Pallur Eman, Kaitheri Ambu, Kannavath Nambiar, Thalakkal Chandu, Sankaran Moopan and Edachena Kunkan.

== Forest forts ==
In his decades-long war to oust invaders, the Raja developed an elaborate system of cantonments and forts in the jungly and mountainous part of his country.

Four of them stand out – a granite fort on Purali range [modern Muzhakunnu] which was built by his ancestor Harischandra Perumal over a thousand years ago. He had another granite fort at Manatana. In Wayanad, he had a great fort in Mananthavady which was reported to have ability to house his whole army of 6000 men. He also had a stronghold in Todikulam near Kannavam which belonged to his supporter Kannavath Sankaran.

His strongholds such as such as Kottamalai in Cherambadi or Nellakotai in Pandalur do not survive today. Ruins of a fort in Purali survive today as a heap of granite boulders. A nearby black-stone cave where Raja once lived can still be found.

== Legacy ==
- Pazhassi Dam
- Pazhassi Raja College, Pulpally, Bathery
- Pazhassi Raja N.S.S. College, Mattanur
- Pazhassi Raja Postal Cover
- Pazhassi Raja Park, Mananthavady
- Pazhassi Raja Kovilakam
- Pazhassi Raja Tomb
- Pazhassi Raja Archaeological Museum
- Pazhassi Raja Charitable Trust
- Statue of Pazhassi Raja
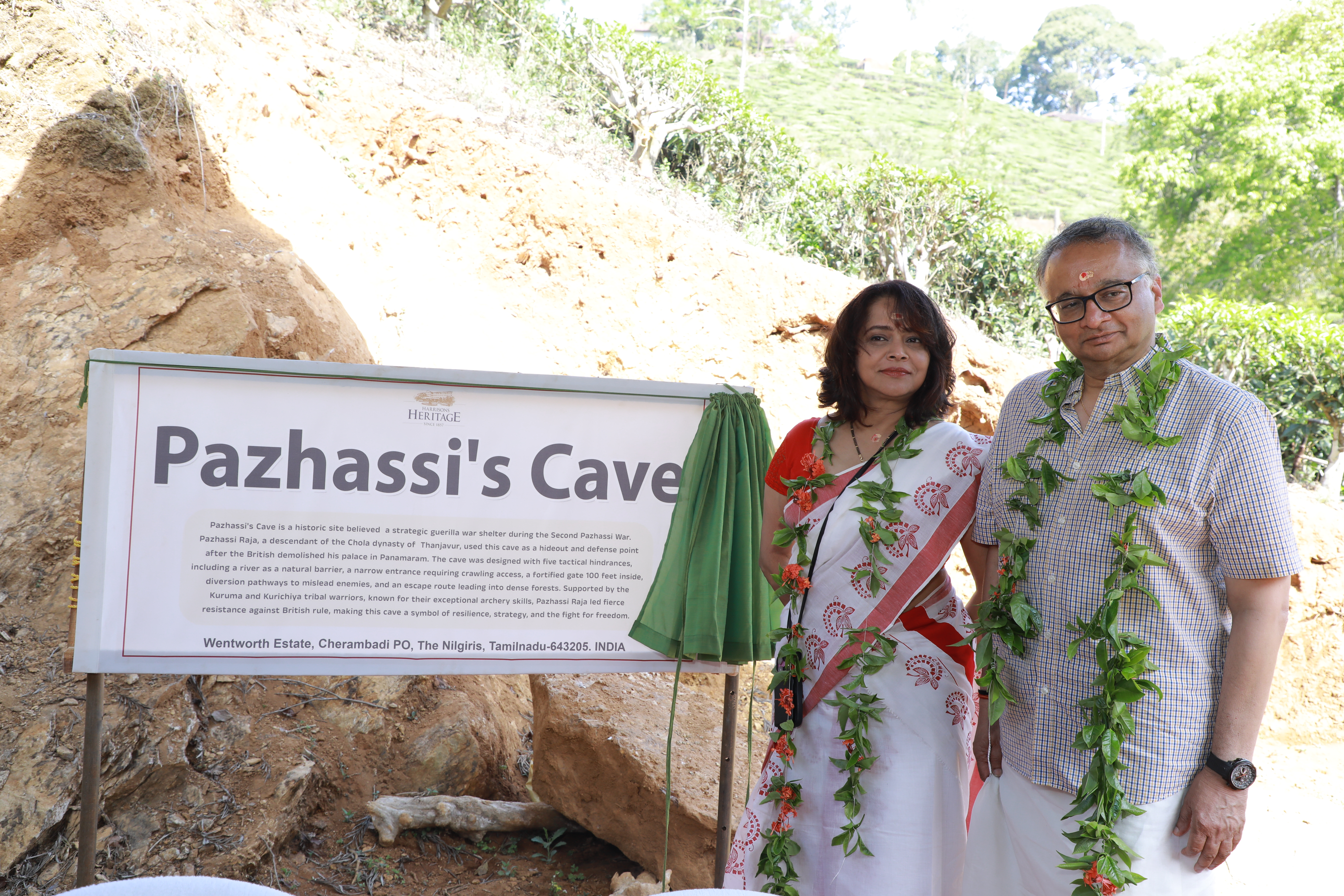
- Pazhassi's Cave
  Pazhassi's Cave : a historic marvel in Cherambadi, was inaugurated on 28-02-2025 by Kochu Thampuratty Subha Varma, the 6th-generation great-granddaughter of Pazhassi Raja, and her husband, Dr. Kishore. This ancient cave, built by the legendary king, stands as a tribute to his legacy and the region’s rich heritage.
- Pazhassi Raja Park, Thalassery
- Pazhassi Raja School, Kuthampully
- Pazhassi Raja universal public school, Balussery
- Pazhassi Raja Road, Ernakulam
- Pazhassi Raja Memorial and Library, Nellunni

== In popular culture ==
Pazhassi Raja appears in numerous folk songs in North Malabar, in which his resistance to the East India Company is the primary subject.

- A drama titled Pazhassi Raja was composed by Kappana Krishna Menon in the early 20th century.
- Historian K. M. Panikkar wrote a historical novel named Keralasimham in 1941, which is based on life of Pazhassi Raja.
- The 1964 Malayalam film titled Pazhassi Raja was based on his life. It was directed by Kunchacko and starring Kottarakkara Sreedharan Nair as Pazhassi Raja.
- Surya TV telecasted a serial with popular film actor Sai Kumar playing the title character.
- The 2009 Malayalam film Kerala Varma Pazhassi Raja depicts the life of the Raja. Directed by Hariharan and written by M. T. Vasudevan Nair. starring Mammootty as pazhassi Raja. The political situation of the time is portrayed from different viewpoints, and the locals are treated sympathetically in this film.
- In S.S. Rajamouli's Telugu film RRR. In the song 'ettuka jenda', he has been mentioned along with some other historical personalities who fought against the British Raj in India.
- Pazhassi Raja's heroic life and resistance against British colonial rule are an integral part of the school curriculum in Kerala, taught from elementary to higher levels. As a result, he is widely known and respected across the state, with generations of students growing up learning about his courage, leadership, and unwavering patriotism
