= Kingdom of Kottayam =

Feudal city-state in Malabar, India

Coordinates: 11.828°N 75.55°E

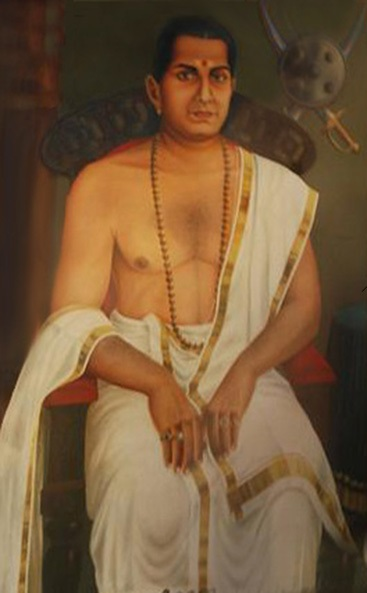
Veera Kerala Varma Pazhassi Raja; painting by Raja Ravi Varma.

Kottayam (Cotiote) was a feudal city-state in Malabar, present-day Kerala, India. Kottayam (Cotiote) is famed for Pazhassi Raja, one of the principal leaders of the Wayanad Insurrection (Kottayam Pazhassi rebellion or Kottayam War). Pazhassi Raja was a member of the western branch of the Kottayam royal clan. When Hyder Ali of the Kingdom of Mysore occupied Malabar in 1773, the Raja of Kottayam found political asylum in Travancore. In 1790, the British recognized Pazhassi Raja as the head of Kottayam instead of the original Raja who had taken refuge at Travancore.

== History ==
The origin of the Kottayam royal family is lost in obscurity. By tradition Harischandara Perumal who built a fort at Puralimala and resided there is regarded as the founder of the Kottayam family. The rajas of Kottayam were therefore called Puralisas and were also known as Purannattu rajas, who ruled over the land of Purainad. Descendants of the Puraikizhar family and are referred to in the Tirunelveli copper plate of Bhaskara Ravi Varman. They were historically classified as Samantan rank vassals similar to the Kolathiri and Zamorin below the Cochin–Perumpadappu Swarupam Samanthan Kshatriyas.

At times, the part of Kolathunad, the Kottayam principality gradually acquired independent control over the territories lying in the Tellichery taluk, shared the area with the Iruvazhinad Nambiars and also extended its jurisdiction up to the borders of Coorg. The family came to have three branches: Eastern, Southern and Western. The first two had their seat at Kottayam and the last at Pazhassi.

== Geography ==
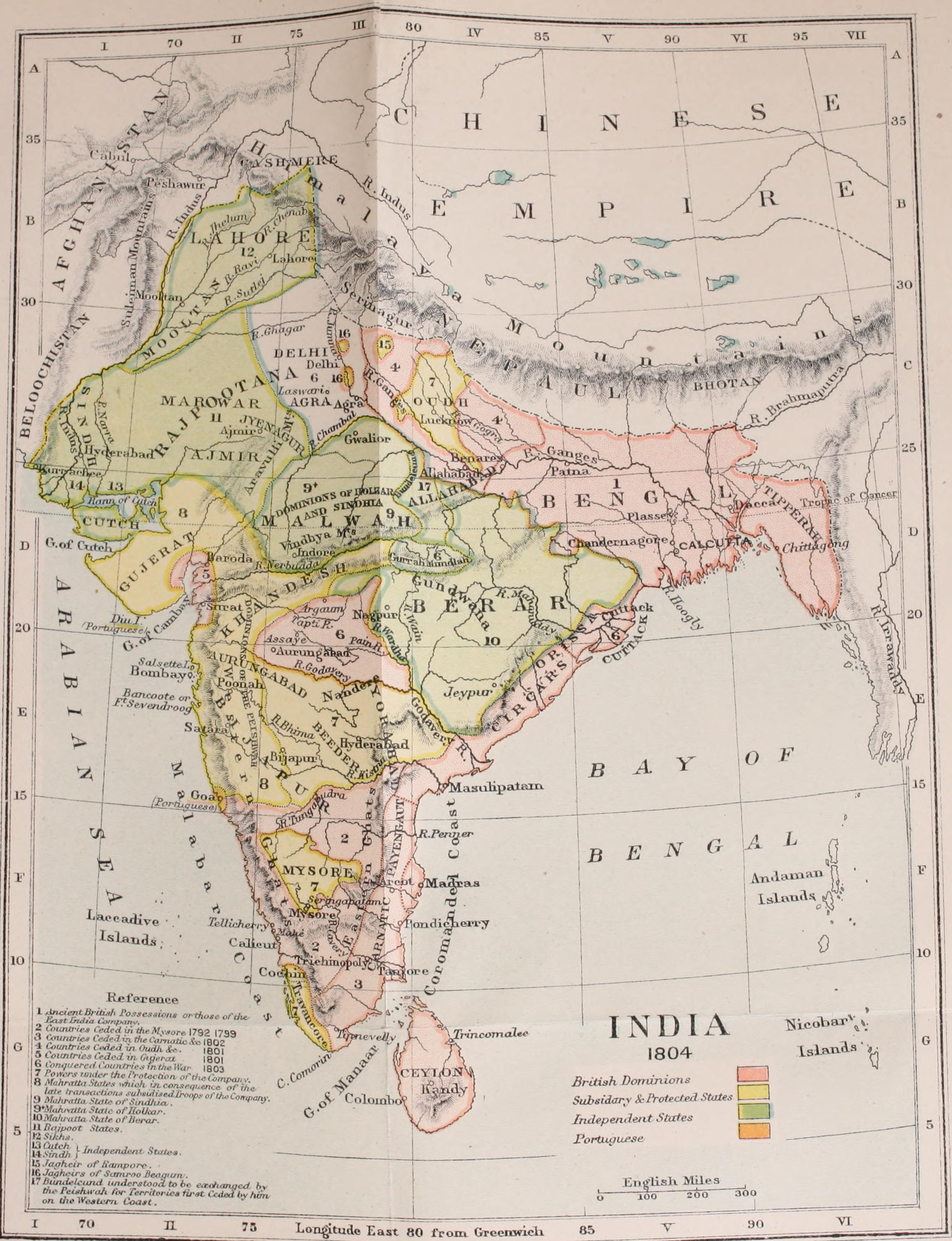
India in 1804. Thalassery, Kozhikode, and Kochi are marked as cities in the present-day state of Kerala

The Kingdom of Kottayam covered what is today Talassery taluk, Iritty taluk (1000 km^{2}) of Kannur District and Wayanad District (2000 km^{2}). The headquarters of this kingdom were located in Kottayam, a small town not far from Tellicherry. The royal dynasty of the princely state of Kottayam was called Purannatt Swarupam. The Padinjare Kovilakam or Western Branch of this royal dynasty was located at Pazhassi and is famous for its heroic royal prince, Pazhassi Raja.

== Cradle of Kathakali ==
The institution of Kathakali gained in progress and richness during the time of the Raja of Kottayam, between 1665 AD and 1725 AD. The then-raja of Kottayam was a brilliant actor-dancer who structured several compositions to complete the transition of Kathakali from its earlier form, Ramanattam, developed by Kottarakkara Thampuran. The Kottayam family produced two distinguished scholars, Kerala Varma Thampuran, the author of Valmiki Ramayanam Kilippattu and Vidwan Thampuran, the great patron of Kathakali and composer of Attakathas. Many dedicated artists like Chathu Panicker also endeavoured to lay the foundations for what is known as Kathakali now. Their efforts were concentrated on the rituals, classical details, and scriptural perfection. Even now the basic details of Kathakali have not changed considerably from this format. Bakavadham, Kirmeeravadham, Kalyana Saugandhikam, and Nivathakayacha Kalakeyavadham are the four perfect Kottayam works. After this, the most important changes in Kathakali were brought about through the efforts of a single person, namely Kaplingad Narayanan Nambudiri. After basic instruction in various faculties of the art in Vettathu Kalari of North Malabar, he shifted to Travancore and there in its capital and many other centres he found many willing to co-operate with him in bringing about these reforms.

== See also ==
- Kottayam-Malabar
