= Kerala School Sports Meet =

Multi-sport event in Kerala, India

- Status: Active
- Genre: Sports Event
- Frequency: Annually
- Venue: Kerala
- Country: India
- Founded: 1956 as Kerala State School Athletics & Games; 2024 as Kerala School Sports Meet
- Founder: R. Sankar
- Most recent: 2024
- Participants: 20000
- Area: Kinder Garden to Higher Secondary Classes
- Organiser: Government of Kerala
- People: V. Sivankutty
- Sponsor: IT@school

The Kerala School Sports Meet, previously known as Kerala State School Athletics and Games were inaugurated in 1956 by R. Sankar, the then Chief Minister of Kerala. This initiative was established to promote athletics and physical education among school students across the state.

Each year, over 40 sporting events are held, culminating in the announcement of state champions for each event, along with district and school champions. Participants are awarded gold, silver, and bronze medals, celebrating their achievements and fostering a spirit of competition and excellence.

== Background ==
The Kerala State School Athletic Games is an event launched by the Kerala Government to promote sports and physical education among school students. Its goal is to build a strong sports culture by encouraging student participation in various athletic events, helping to identify and nurture young talent. The program organizes competitions by age group, offering a wide range of events, from athletics to team sports. Schools compete at district, sub-district and state levels. In collaboration with the Kerala State Sports Council and the Department of General Education, the initiative not only promotes physical fitness but also emphasizes teamwork and discipline, supporting the overall development of students.

=== Olympics-model ===
The Kerala Education Department launched the inaugural "School Olympics" in 2024, an event that aims to revolutionize school sports in the state. Scheduled to take place in Kochi from November 4 to 11, this historic sports meet will feature students from across Kerala competing in 39 diverse sports, including athletics, team sports, and inclusive sports designed for disabled athletes. This initiative marks a first of its kind in India, emphasizing the importance of sports in the educational landscape. The winning district will be awarded a 3-kilogram gold trophy, named in honour of the Chief Minister, although logistical challenges may delay its presentation until next year. The opening ceremony at Jawaharlal Nehru Stadium (Kochi) promises to be a vibrant celebration, incorporating cultural performances inspired by the Olympic spirit. Competitions will be held at 19 different venues throughout Kochi, with the inclusion of students from Kerala schools in the Gulf states for the first time. This revamped event signifies a significant evolution from the traditional focus on athletics in school sports meets, as the Public Education Department has meticulously planned a torch relay featuring international athletes, a grand march-past, a theme song, and a sports-cultural festival. The new School Olympics aims to become a landmark event in Kerala's education system, promoting the integration of sports with academics and the arts, thereby fostering a holistic approach to student development.

Students from the Gulf region will also participate in the Kerala State School Olympics in Kochi. The Director of Public Education issued a circular inviting non-resident students to take part in the event. This marks the first time that students from Gulf countries have been invited to a state government-sponsored sports event. The team from the United Arab Emirates will compete as the 15th district in the games, adding international dimension to the competition.

However, on 22 October 2024, the Education Department decided to remove the term 'Olympics' from the title of the school sports festival. This decision stems from regulations that prohibit the use of the word 'Olympics' without authorization from the International Olympic Committee (IOC). Initially, the government had named the event a major sports festival, but upon realizing that 'Olympics' is a registered trademark protected under the Olympic Charter, they retracted the name. Thus, the event will now officially be called the "Kerala School Sports Meet". All future promotional materials and official documents related to the event will reflect this updated name. Moving forward, it will be referred to as the "Kerala School Kayika Mela in Olympic Model Kochi-24", aligning with the revised branding while maintaining the essence of a large-scale sports festival.

==== Format ====
The 2024 Kerala School Sports Meet was modeled after the Olympic Games, including opening and closing ceremonies similar to those of the Olympics. Athletes who secured top positions received medals modeled after the Olympic design, along with cash awards and certificates.

The events are grouped into three main categories: Athletics, Aquatics, and Games. Participants, both boys and girls, competes in age divisions—Sub-Junior, Junior, and Senior. Points are awarded as follows: 5 points for gold, 3 points for silver, and 1 point for bronze. Trophies and medals are given to the top three athletes in each event, with additional recognition for overall champions in Athletics, Aquatics, and Games. The overall champion district is determined by adding up the points across all events and divisions.

Participating Districts / Regions
- Alappuzha
- Ernakulam
- Idukki
- Kannur
- Kasargod
- Kollam
- Kottayam
- Kozhikode
- Malappuram
- Palakkad
- Pathanamthitta
- Thiruvananthapuram
- Thrissur
- Wayanad
- United Arab Emirates (Malayali diaspora)

=== Selection of participants ===
The Education Department manages the selection process for the Kerala School Sports Meet, ensuring that rules and regulations are followed at every level, from sub-district to state. The system aims to identify top athletes across the state, allowing them to progress from sub-district to district, and eventually to the state level.

==== Inclusivity ====
In 2024, the Kerala School Sports Meet featured 1,800 disabled students who participated in 21 events. These included 3 team games and 18 athletic competitions. This was the first time that disabled students competed in the inclusive category at the state school sports festival. The events in this category included athletics, football, handball, and badminton.

==== Age categories ====
Participants are divided into three main categories based on age:

1. Under-14 (Sub-junior): Players must be born after January 1, 2011.
2. Under-17 (Junior): Players must be born after January 1, 2008.
3. Under-19 (Senior): Players must be born after January 1, 2006.

In addition to these categories, competitions are also held at lower levels for Kiddies, LP Kiddies, and LP Mini categories, for younger students.

==== Participation process ====
Each revenue district is assigned a set number of participants for each sport to ensure fair competition. The number of athletes allowed per district is consistent for each event.

- In athletics, the competition includes 25 track and field events. Each district can send up to three participants per event, except for the relay events, which allow more athletes.
- In swimming, districts can send six participants for relays and three participants in individual events across 19 swimming events.
- For shooting, three participants are allowed per district in each of the three events.
- In archery, four participants can compete in each of the six events from each district.
- Tug of war (a traditional sport) allows a team of nine players, although the competition itself is for an eight-member team. The total body weight of the eight-member boys' team must not exceed 560 kg, while the girls' team has a limit of 440 kg.

=== Sport events ===
As of 2024, the following sports events are held annually:

- Aquatics
  - Swimming
  - Water polo
- Archery
- Athletics
- Badminton
  - Ball badminton
- Baseball
- Basketball
- Boxing
- Chess
- Cricket
- Cross country
- Cycling
- Fencing
- Football
  - Subroto Cup football
- Gymnastics
- Handball
- Hockey
- Judo
- Kabaddi
- Karate
- Kho kho
- Netball
- Powerlifting
- Roller skating
- Sepak takraw
- Shooting
- Softball
- Taekwondo
- Table tennis
- Tennis
- Tennikoit
- Throwball
- Tug of war
- Volleyball
- Weightlifting
- Wrestling
- Wushu
- Yoga

== Medal table ==
The following medal table is based on performances in Aquatics and Athletics events, with data and medal tallies recorded from 2011 onward. No competitions were held in 2020 and 2021 due to the impact of the COVID-19 pandemic.

=== Athletic Events ===
==== District-wise Medal Tally ====
The following table displays the total number of medals earned by each district in athletic events.

Rank	District	Gold	Silver	Bronze	Total
1	Ernakulam	274	242	201	717
2	Palakkad	272	244	205	721
3	Kozhikode	121	122	119	362
4	Thiruvananthapuram	73	81	94	248
5	Thrissur	63	59	56	178
6	Malappuram	62	93	92	247
7	Kottayam	45	64	68	177
8	Kannur	26	25	31	82
9	Alappuzha	23	27	45	95
10	Idukki	22	27	56	105
11	Kasargod	19	11	9	39
12	Kollam	13	12	20	45
13	Wayanad	10	21	23	54
14	Pathanamthitta	9	13	7	29

==== District-Wise Annual Champions (Athletic) ====
Year	Number of Events	Districts (Top 3)	Number of		Medals awarded			Best Performing School	Number of		Date & Location
Year	Number of Events	Districts (Top 3)	Points Earned	Medals Earned	1st place, gold medalist(s)	2nd place, silver medalist(s)	3rd place, bronze medalist(s)	Best Performing School	Points Earned	Medals Earned	Date & Location
2011	94	Ernakulam	278	85	28	32	25	Mar Basil Higher Secondary School, Kothamangalam; Ernakulam	150	44	December 4 – 7, Ernakulam
2011	94	Palakkad	232	61	26	24	11	Mar Basil Higher Secondary School, Kothamangalam; Ernakulam	150	44	December 4 – 7, Ernakulam
2011	94	Kozhikode	76	23	8	6	9	Mar Basil Higher Secondary School, Kothamangalam; Ernakulam	150	44	December 4 – 7, Ernakulam
2012	94	Palakkad	272	79	28	28	23	St. George's Higher Secondary School, Kothamangalam; Ernakulam	111	33	December 4 – 7, Thiruvananthapuram
2012	94	Ernakulam	257	82	28	30	24	St. George's Higher Secondary School, Kothamangalam; Ernakulam	111	33	December 4 – 7, Thiruvananthapuram
2012	94	Kozhikode	84	26	10	8	8	St. George's Higher Secondary School, Kothamangalam; Ernakulam	111	33	December 4 – 7, Thiruvananthapuram
2013	95	Ernakulam	251	79	28	24	27	St. George's Higher Secondary School, Kothamangalam; Ernakulam	100	33	November 23 – 26, Ernakulam
2013	95	Palakkad	218	67	27	14	26	St. George's Higher Secondary School, Kothamangalam; Ernakulam	100	33	November 23 – 26, Ernakulam
2013	95	Kozhikode	110	32	11	12	9	St. George's Higher Secondary School, Kothamangalam; Ernakulam	100	33	November 23 – 26, Ernakulam
2014	95	Ernakulam	289	81	33	28	20	St. George's Higher Secondary School, Kothamangalam; Ernakulam	83	29	December 8 – 11, Thiruvananthapuram
2014	95	Palakkad	190	61	15	26	20	St. George's Higher Secondary School, Kothamangalam; Ernakulam	83	29	December 8 – 11, Thiruvananthapuram
2014	95	Kozhikode	156	48	16	17	15	St. George's Higher Secondary School, Kothamangalam; Ernakulam	83	29	December 8 – 11, Thiruvananthapuram
2015	95	Ernakulam	241	71	25	28	18	Mar Basil Higher Secondary School, Kothamangalam; Ernakulam	91	29	December 5 – 8, Kozhikode
2015	95	Palakkad	225	68	24	23	21	Mar Basil Higher Secondary School, Kothamangalam; Ernakulam	91	29	December 5 – 8, Kozhikode
2015	95	Kozhikode	130	34	16	9	9	Mar Basil Higher Secondary School, Kothamangalam; Ernakulam	91	29	December 5 – 8, Kozhikode
2016	95	Palakkad	255	74	28	25	21	Mar Basil Higher Secondary School, Kothamangalam; Ernakulam	107	35	December 3 – 6, Malappuram
2016	95	Ernakulam	247	75	24	31	20	Mar Basil Higher Secondary School, Kothamangalam; Ernakulam	107	35	December 3 – 6, Malappuram
2016	95	Kozhikode	101	27	12	8	7	Mar Basil Higher Secondary School, Kothamangalam; Ernakulam	107	35	December 3 – 6, Malappuram
2017	95	Ernakulam	258	71	34	16	21	Mar Basil Higher Secondary School, Kothamangalam; Ernakulam	75	21	October 20 – 23, Kottayam
2017	95	Palakkad	185	60	22	14	24	Mar Basil Higher Secondary School, Kothamangalam; Ernakulam	75	21	October 20 – 23, Kottayam
2017	95	Kozhikode	109	34	8	20	6	Mar Basil Higher Secondary School, Kothamangalam; Ernakulam	75	21	October 20 – 23, Kottayam
2018	96	Ernakulam	253	76	30	26	20	St. George's Higher Secondary School, Kothamangalam; Ernakulam	81	25	October 26 – 29, Thiruvananthapuram
2018	96	Palakkad	196	53	24	16	13	St. George's Higher Secondary School, Kothamangalam; Ernakulam	81	25	October 26 – 29, Thiruvananthapuram
2018	96	Thiruvananthapuram	101	31	10	11	10	St. George's Higher Secondary School, Kothamangalam; Ernakulam	81	25	October 26 – 29, Thiruvananthapuram
2019	98	Palakkad	201	60	18	26	16	Mar Basil Higher Secondary School, Kothamangalam; Ernakulam	62	20	November 15 – 18, Kannur
2019	98	Ernakulam	157	46	21	14	11	Mar Basil Higher Secondary School, Kothamangalam; Ernakulam	62	20	November 15 – 18, Kannur
2019	98	Kozhikode	123	39	14	7	18	Mar Basil Higher Secondary School, Kothamangalam; Ernakulam	62	20	November 15 – 18, Kannur
2022	98	Palakkad	201	71	32	21	18	Ideal E. H. S. S. Kadakassery; Palakkad	66	20	December 3 – 6, Thiruvananthapuram
2022	98	Malappuram	149	44	13	17	14	Ideal E. H. S. S. Kadakassery; Palakkad	66	20	December 3 – 6, Thiruvananthapuram
2022	98	Kozhikode	122	40	8	16	16	Ideal E. H. S. S. Kadakassery; Palakkad	66	20	December 3 – 6, Thiruvananthapuram
2023	98	Palakkad	266	67	28	27	12	Ideal E. H. S. S. Kadakassery; Palakkad	57	23	October 16 – 20, Thrissur
2023	98	Malappuram	168	55	13	22	20	Ideal E. H. S. S. Kadakassery; Palakkad	57	23	October 16 – 20, Thrissur
2023	98	Kozhikode	95	29	10	7	12	Ideal E. H. S. S. Kadakassery; Palakkad	57	23	October 16 – 20, Thrissur
Kerala School Sports Meet
2024	39	Thiruvananthapuram	1935	541	227	150	164	G. V. Raja Sports School; Thiruvananthapuram	268	68	November 4 – 11, Kochi
2024	39	Thrissur	848	244	80	65	99	G. V. Raja Sports School; Thiruvananthapuram	268	68	November 4 – 11, Kochi
2024	39	Malappuram	824	292	64	90	138	G. V. Raja Sports School; Thiruvananthapuram	268	68	November 4 – 11, Kochi

=== Aquatic Events ===
==== District-wise Medal Tally ====
The following table displays the total number of medals earned by each district in aquatic events. Due to the unavailability of data for the events held in 2012 and 2018, those years have been excluded from the following information.

Rank	District	Gold	Silver	Bronze	Total
1	Thiruvananthapuram	661	603	502	1766
2	Ernakulam	138	105	122	365
3	Thrissur	69	108	167	344
4	Kottayam	45	53	58	156
5	Palakkad	8	32	58	98
6	Kasargod	2	8	15	25
6	Kollam	2	1	2	5
7	Kozhikode	0	12	5	17
8	Kannur	0	6	7	13
9	Alappuzha	0	5	3	8
10	Malappuram	0	1	0	1
11	Idukki	0	0	0	0
11	Pathanamthitta	0	0	0	0
11	Wayanad	0	0	0	0

==== District-Wise Annual Champions (Aquatic) ====
Year	Number of Events	Districts (Top 3)	Number of		Medals awarded			Best Performing School	Number of		Date & Location
Year	Number of Events	Districts (Top 3)	Points Earned	Medals Earned	1st place, gold medalist(s)	2nd place, silver medalist(s)	3rd place, bronze medalist(s)	Best Performing School	Points Earned	Medals Earned	Date & Location
2011	104	Thiruvananthapuram	666	201	68	63	70	Government V. H. S. S, Kalamassery; Ernakulam	57	13	October 24 – 27, Aquatics Complex Thrissur
2011	104	Ernakulam	232	44	21	13	10	Government V. H. S. S, Kalamassery; Ernakulam	57	13	October 24 – 27, Aquatics Complex Thrissur
2011	104	Thrissur	127	40	13	8	19	Government V. H. S. S, Kalamassery; Ernakulam	57	13	October 24 – 27, Aquatics Complex Thrissur
2013	104	Thiruvananthapuram	657	201	66	69	66	Government V. H. S. S, Pirappancode; Thiruvananthapuram	202	58	October 28 – 31, Swimming Pool Pirappancode
2013	104	Ernakulam	224	54	26	19	9	Government V. H. S. S, Pirappancode; Thiruvananthapuram	202	58	October 28 – 31, Swimming Pool Pirappancode
2013	104	Thrissur	134	43	10	13	20	Government V. H. S. S, Pirappancode; Thiruvananthapuram	202	58	October 28 – 31, Swimming Pool Pirappancode
2014	104	Thiruvananthapuram	686	199	78	60	61	Government V. H. S. S, Pirappancode; Thiruvananthapuram	223	63	October 28 – 31, Aquatics Complex Thrissur
2014	104	Ernakulam	157	42	14	15	13	Government V. H. S. S, Pirappancode; Thiruvananthapuram	223	63	October 28 – 31, Aquatics Complex Thrissur
2014	104	Thrissur	131	44	11	14	19	Government V. H. S. S, Pirappancode; Thiruvananthapuram	223	63	October 28 – 31, Aquatics Complex Thrissur
2015	104	Thiruvananthapuram	663	196	69	69	58	Government V. H. S. S, Pirappancode; Thiruvananthapuram	161	49	October 28 – 31, Aquatics Complex Thrissur
2015	104	Thrissur	168	57	12	17	28	Government V. H. S. S, Pirappancode; Thiruvananthapuram	161	49	October 28 – 31, Aquatics Complex Thrissur
2015	104	Ernakulam	137	31	18	4	9	Government V. H. S. S, Pirappancode; Thiruvananthapuram	161	49	October 28 – 31, Aquatics Complex Thrissur
2016	104	Thiruvananthapuram	683	203	71	70	62	Government V. H. S. S, Pirappancode; Thiruvananthapuram	161	49	October 28 – 31, Aquatics Complex Thrissur
2016	104	Ernakulam	142	35	14	11	10	Government V. H. S. S, Pirappancode; Thiruvananthapuram	161	49	October 28 – 31, Aquatics Complex Thrissur
2016	104	Thrissur	134	46	10	14	22	Government V. H. S. S, Pirappancode; Thiruvananthapuram	161	49	October 28 – 31, Aquatics Complex Thrissur
2017	104	Thiruvananthapuram	698	200	76	67	57	Government V. H. S. S, Kalamassery; Ernakulam	55	13	November 10 – 13, Aquatics Complex Thrissur
2017	104	Thrissur	140	50	6	20	24	Government V. H. S. S, Kalamassery; Ernakulam	55	13	November 10 – 13, Aquatics Complex Thrissur
2017	104	Ernakulam	111	29	13	7	9	Government V. H. S. S, Kalamassery; Ernakulam	55	13	November 10 – 13, Aquatics Complex Thrissur
2019	104	Thiruvananthapuram	648	169	70	69	30	Rajagiri Higher Secondary School, Kalamassery; Ernakulam	67	21	October 29 – November 1, Aquatics Complex Thrissur
2019	104	Ernakulam	160	53	16	10	27	Rajagiri Higher Secondary School, Kalamassery; Ernakulam	67	21	October 29 – November 1, Aquatics Complex Thrissur
2019	104	Kottayam	147	39	15	12	12	Rajagiri Higher Secondary School, Kalamassery; Ernakulam	67	21	October 29 – November 1, Aquatics Complex Thrissur
2022	104	Thiruvananthapuram	705	198	79	65	54	Govt. Girls H. S. S, Kanniakulangara; Thiruvananthapuram	96	32	November 7 – 9, Aquatics Complex Thrissur
2022	104	Ernakulam	139	40	13	12	15	Govt. Girls H. S. S, Kanniakulangara; Thiruvananthapuram	96	32	November 7 – 9, Aquatics Complex Thrissur
2022	104	Thrissur	75	21	6	8	7	Govt. Girls H. S. S, Kanniakulangara; Thiruvananthapuram	96	32	November 7 – 9, Aquatics Complex Thrissur
2023	103	Thiruvananthapuram	721	199	84	64	51	Madhava Vilasom H. S. S, Thundathil; Thiruvananthapuram	132	30	December 8 – 11, Dr.B R Ambedkar International Aquatic Complex, Pirappancode
2023	103	Ernakulam	99	37	3	14	20	Madhava Vilasom H. S. S, Thundathil; Thiruvananthapuram	132	30	December 8 – 11, Dr.B R Ambedkar International Aquatic Complex, Pirappancode
2023	103	Kottayam	73	23	7	6	10	Madhava Vilasom H. S. S, Thundathil; Thiruvananthapuram	132	30	December 8 – 11, Dr.B R Ambedkar International Aquatic Complex, Pirappancode
