= G. V. Raja Sports School =

- ജി.വി. രാജ സ്പോർട്സ് സ്കൂൾ

Location
- Sports School Rd, Mailom, Perumkulam; Aruvikkara, Kerala 695573; India
- Coordinates: 8°33′26″N 77°00′36″E

Information
- Type: State, Sports school
- Established: 1974 (52 years ago)
- Founder: P. Ravindran
- Authority: Directorate Of Sports & Youth Affairs Kerala
- Principal: Dr. Pradeep C.S
- Grades: 8-12
- Gender: Co-educational
- Campus type: Suburban
- Accreditation: Department of General Education
- Website: gvrsportsschool.org

G. V. Raja Sports School is a State sports school in Aruvikkara, Thiruvananthapuram, Kerala, focused on developing young athletes in various sports. It is one of the three sports schools in Kerala under the Directorate of Sports & Youth Affairs, alongside the Sports Division in Thrissur and the Sports School in Kannur.

Founded in 1974, it is named after Lt. Col. P. R. Godha Varma Raja, known as the "Father of Sports in Kerala," to honor his contributions to sports promotion in the state.

== History ==
In the early 1970s, discussions began about improving sports standards in Kerala. On April 7, 1970, Sri Raveendran, the Minister for Industries, Labor, and Sports, chaired a meeting focused on the state's sports development. This led to the formation of a committee headed by Justice V. R. Krishna Iyer, tasked with proposing a sports development plan. The committee recommended the creation of sports hostels, schools, and divisions to foster young athletes.

One of the key outcomes of this recommendation was the establishment of the G. V. Raja Sports School in 1974. The school was initially located at Shankumugham Beach in Thiruvananthapuram, providing an environment where aspiring athletes could receive specialized training. The founding of the school was aimed at nurturing young talent and elevating the state's sports performance.

In 2006, the G. V. Raja Sports School was relocated to its current campus at Miletus, near Aruvikkara, Thiruvananthapuram. The move was made to offer better facilities and accommodate the growing needs of the school and its students.

== Facilities ==
The Academic Block has classrooms with teaching aids and offers academic programs from 8th grade to Vocational Higher Secondary levels. The school operates under two administrative frameworks (Directorate Of Sports & Youth Affairs Kerala): the General Education Department (DPI) for grades 8 to 10, and the Vocational Higher Secondary Education (VHSE) Directorate for grades 11 and 12, specializing in Physical education and Sports science.

The Sports Training Block provides facilities for athletics, football, hockey, volleyball, cricket, judo, boxing, and taekwondo. An Indoor Stadium is available for training during adverse weather conditions. The campus includes outdoor playgrounds for football, hockey, basketball, and athletics events.

== Achievements ==
In 2003 and 2018, the school participated in the Subroto Cup International Football Tournament. In 2020, the school competed in the State School Athletic and Games Championship. By 2022, the school enabled 10 students to participate in the 4th Youth Olympics. That same year, the school also took part in the National School Sports Championship.

=== At Kerala School Sports Meet ===
GV Raja Public School has earned recognition as a top performer at the Kerala School Sports Meet, an annual event. In the most recent edition, the 2024 Kerala School Sports Meet, the school was named the best overall performer in the state, with a total of 268 points and 68 medals across categories such as athletics, aquatics, and games.

== Notable alumni ==
Due to the age of the school, it is unclear as to what year some of its alumni graduated. Those whose class is unknown, or assumed, are noted as such.

Notable alumni include:

- K. M. Beenamol – Olympian, recipient of the Arjuna Award in 2001 and Padma Shri in 2004.
- P. R. Sreejesh (class of 2000) – Olympian, former caption of India men's national field hockey team, recipient of the Padma Shri in 2017.
- Shiny Abraham – Olympian, recipient of the Arjuna Award in 1984 and Padma Shri in 1998.
