= Assistive technology in sport =

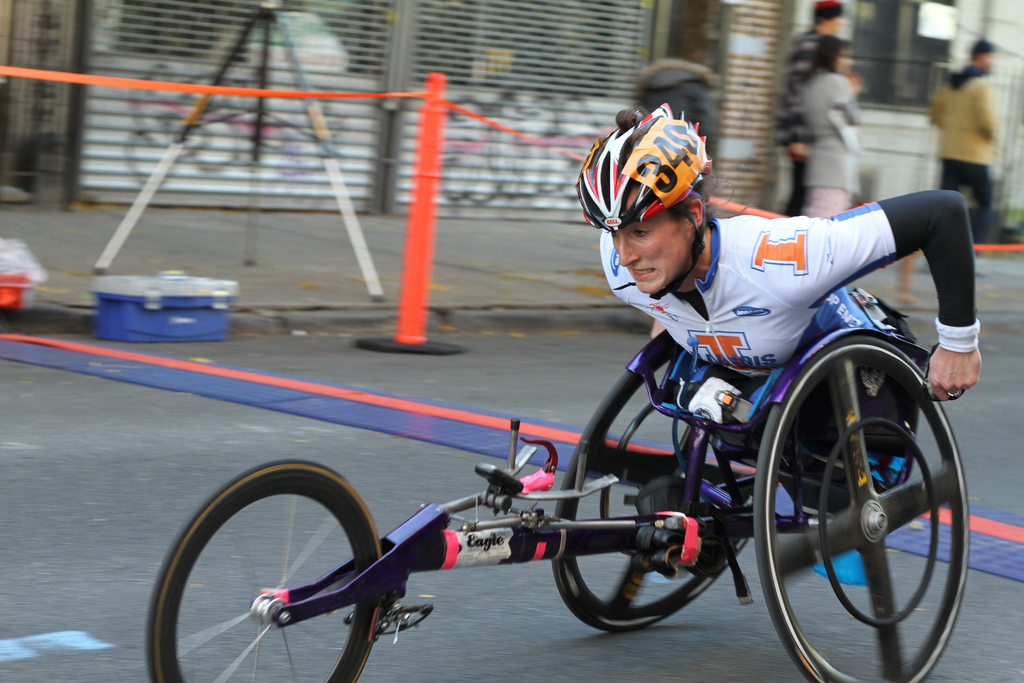
A New York City Marathon competitor uses a racing wheelchair.

Assistive technology in sport is an area of technology design that is growing. Assistive technology is the array of new devices created to enable sports enthusiasts who have disabilities to play. Assistive technology may be used in disabled sports, where an existing sport is modified to enable players with a disability to participate; or, assistive technology may be used to invent completely new sports with athletes with disabilities exclusively in mind.

An increasing number of people with disabilities are participating in sports, leading to the development of new assistive technology. Assistive technology devices can be simple, "low-tech", or they may use highly advanced technology, with some even using computers. Assistive technology for sports may also be simple or advanced. Accordingly, assistive technology can be found in sports ranging from local community recreation to elite Paralympic games. More complex assistive technology devices have been developed over time, and as a result, sports for people with disabilities "have changed from being a clinical therapeutic tool to an increasingly competition-oriented activity".

== Assistive devices ==
Assistive devices can enable exercise and training, on top of enabling participation in a sport. Below are some of the assistive devices currently available for different impairments:

- Mobility impairments:
  - Light-weight wheelchairs for basketball, tennis, and racing
  - All-terrain wheelchairs with rugged frames and wheels for rolling over unpaved surfaces, like hiking trails, snow, or beach sand
  - High performance power wheelchairs for powerchair football (power soccer) and power hockey
  - Handcycles, or recumbent bicycles, which are like bicycles with pedals and steering using only the rider's arms
  - Cross-country sit skis that allow skiers to sit down and push along the trail with tips that dig into the snow
  - Weights that users strap onto their wrists rather than having to hold them with the hands
  - Gym equipment that lets users stay in a wheelchair while using arm exercise machines
  - Mitts with Velcro straps that help users to hold onto an exercise machine if their grip isn't strong enough
  - Elastic band or tubes that exercise muscles through resistance instead of weight
  - Paramobile devices such as specialized golf carts with support for standing assist players with mobility disabilities
  - Bowling balls with hand grips assist bowlers with limited use of their hands
  - One-handed fishing rods assist fishers who have limited mobility
- Visual impairments:
  - Softballs that beep, so that people with visual problems can locate the ball to hit and catch it
  - Basketballs with jingle bells inside for people who have limited or no eyesight
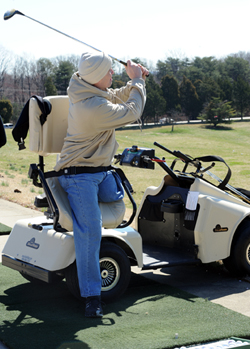
A golfer with a leg amputation uses an adaptive golf cart that has a chest strap to help him maintain his balance while standing on one leg.

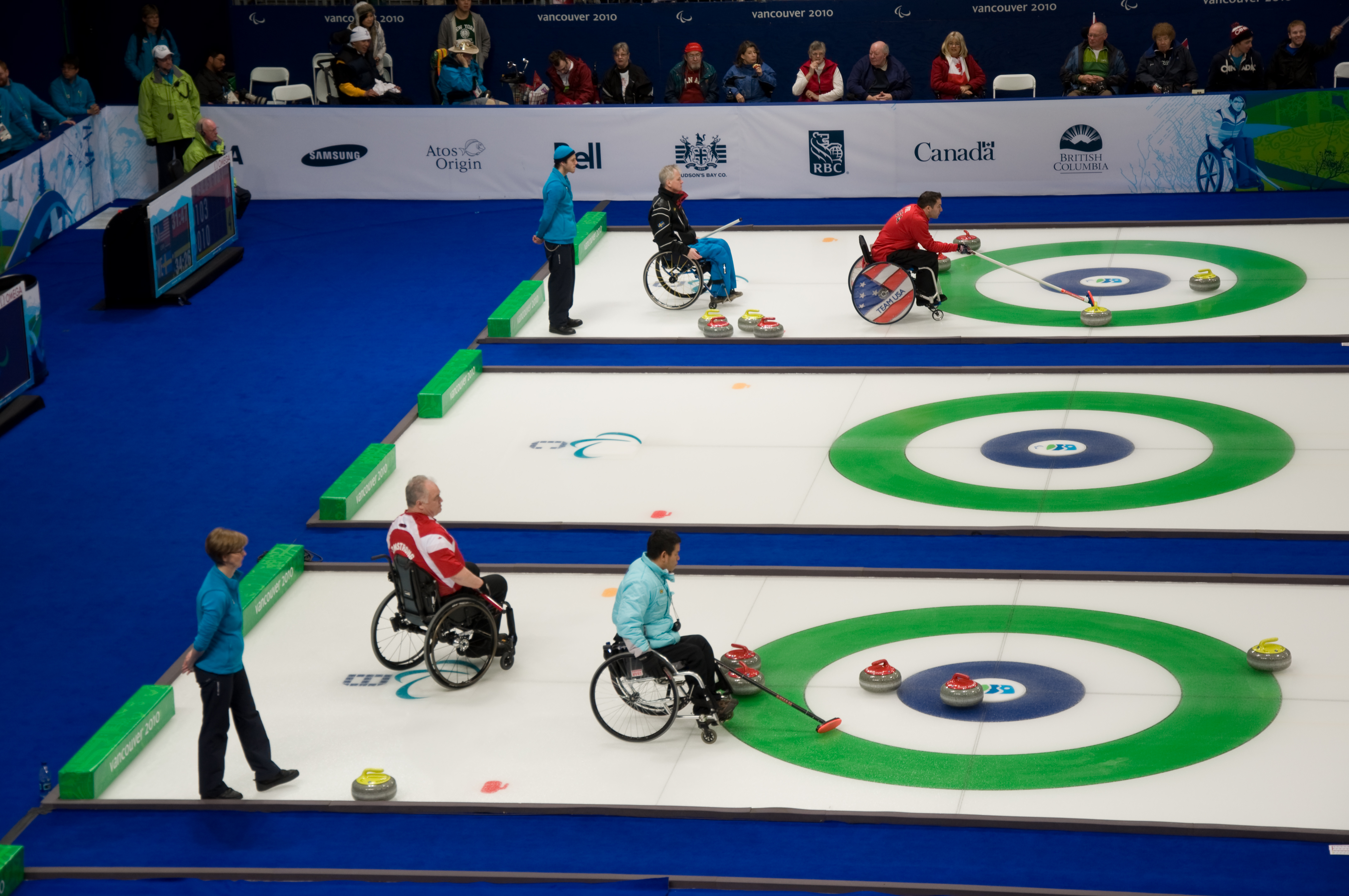
Wheelchair curling uses a specially adapted long stick to launch the "rock" down the ice. These players are delivering rocks in the 2010 Vancouver Paralympics.

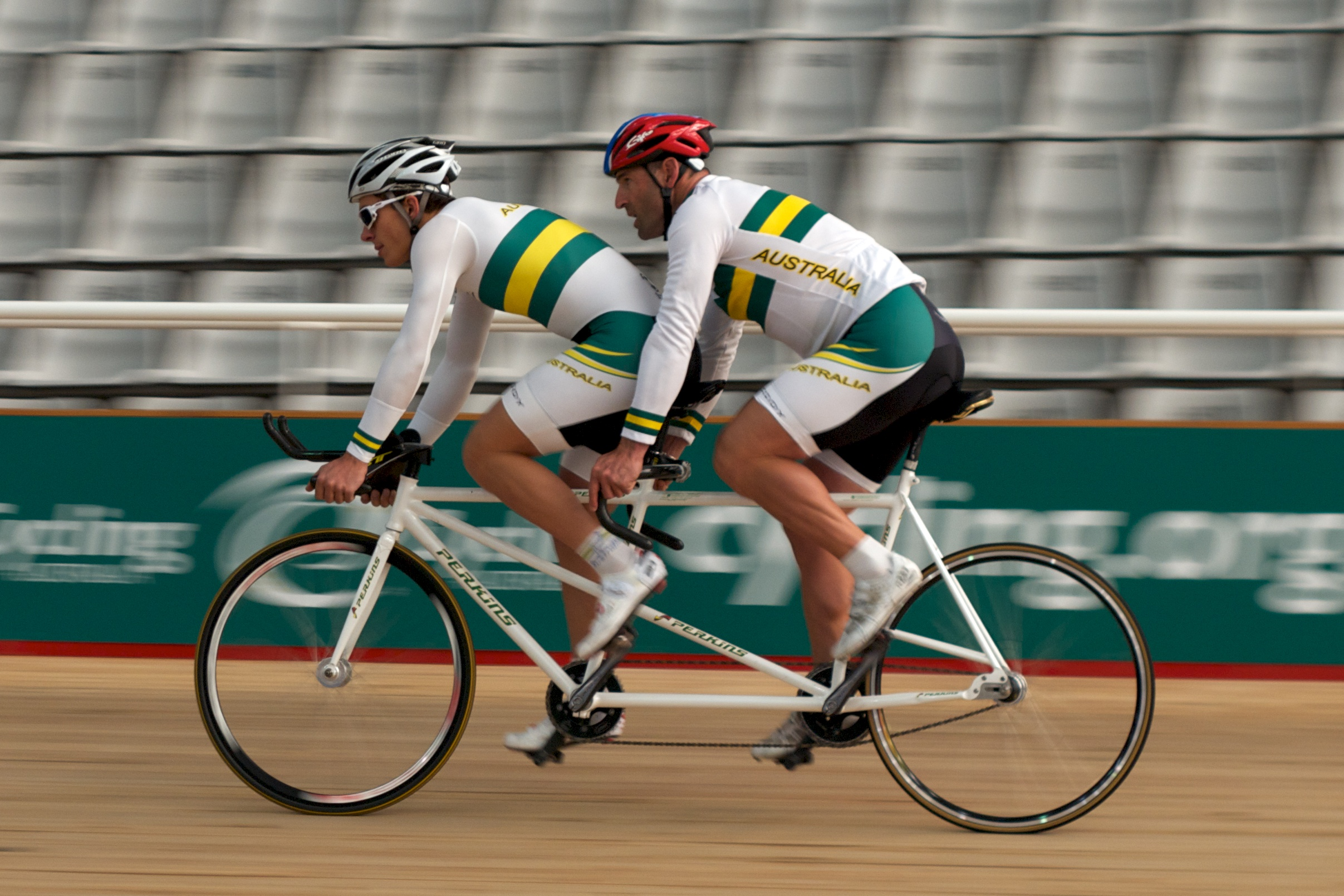
Australian Paralympic athletes using a two-seated tandem racing bicycle; the visually impaired cyclist pedals in rear, while a sighted "pilot" sits in the front.

== Sports using assistive technology ==
Sports that use assistive technology may include the following:

- Accessible Fishing & Hunting
- Accessible Sailing / Boating / Kayaking
- Adaptive Archery
- Adaptive Bowling
- Adaptive Flying
- Adaptive Golf
- Adaptive Horseback Riding/Equestrian
- Adaptive Scuba Diving
- Adaptive Shooting
- Adaptive Skiing & Snowboarding
- Adaptive Table Tennis
- Adaptive Water Sports
- Extreme Wheelchair Sports
- Handcycling
- Power Soccer
- Quad Rugby
- Sled, Floor & Power Hockey
- Wheelchair Basketball
- Wheelchair Curling
- Wheelchair Fencing
- Wheelchair Lacrosse
- Wheelchair Pool and Billiards
- Wheelchair Racing and Field Sports
- Wheelchair Baseball
- Wheelchair Softball
- Wheelchair Table Tennis
- Wheelchair Tennis
- Wheelchair Volleyball
- Wheelchair Weightlifting

Many of the sports listed above have attained international elite sport status, being included in the Paralympic Games.

=== Sports requiring assistive technology ===
Some sports have developed with the goal of creating a challenge that players with a disability could enjoy. These sports require assistive technology for all players as part of the game. Some examples are: Sledge (sled) hockey; wheelchair basketball; adaptive sailing, with boats designed especially for sailors with disabilities; Nordic (cross-country) skiing with "sit-ski" buckets; and handcycling races.

== Sport wheelchair design ==
Sport wheelchairs are designed for the requirements of specific sports. Power chairs can also be fitted with assistive devices that are temporary adaptations to the demands of a sport, such as a kick plate attached to a power chair for powerchair football (power soccer).

Light-weight frames are a necessity for wheelchairs used in sports requiring sharp, fast turns and overall agility, such as tennis, basketball, and racing.

Chairs with reinforced frames and impact protection are required for contact sports, such as wheelchair rugby or basketball.

Racing chairs are designed with bucket seats, angled wheels for improved stability, and a t-frame with a third wheel in front, allowing precision steering and improved balance. The athlete and wheelchair are viewed together by some sport researchers as a unified performance system. Improvements can be made to chairs by evaluating the chair and athlete separately or in performance conditions together.

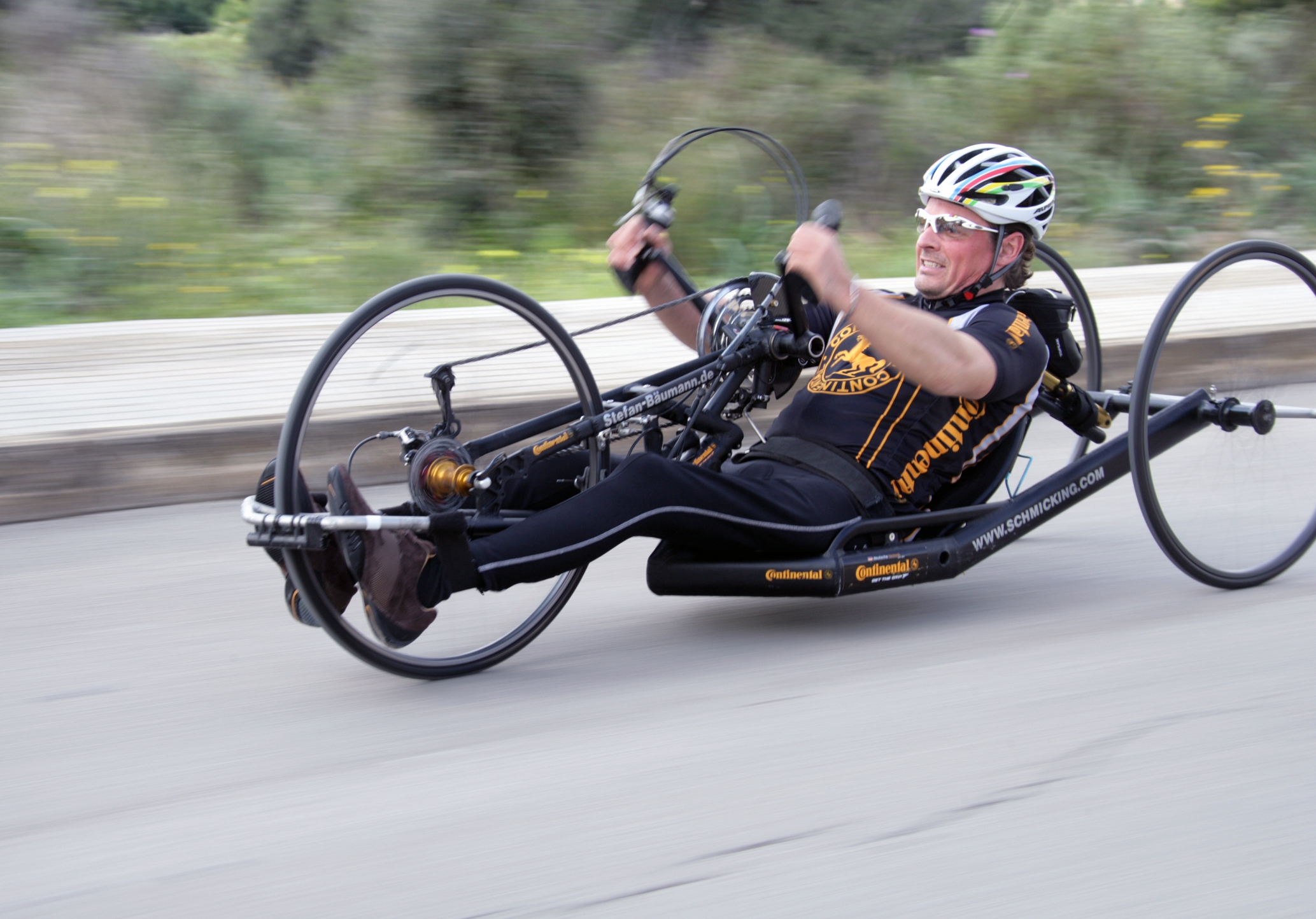
A recumbent racing handcycle with a streamlined frame and thin road racing wheels.

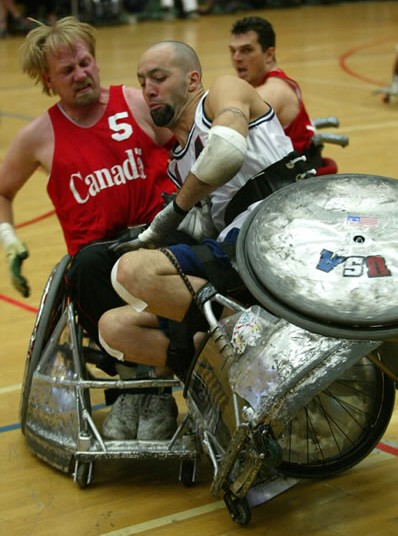
Wheelchair rugby players use wheelchairs with strong frames, foot protection and wheel covers, to prevent injury in this contact sport.

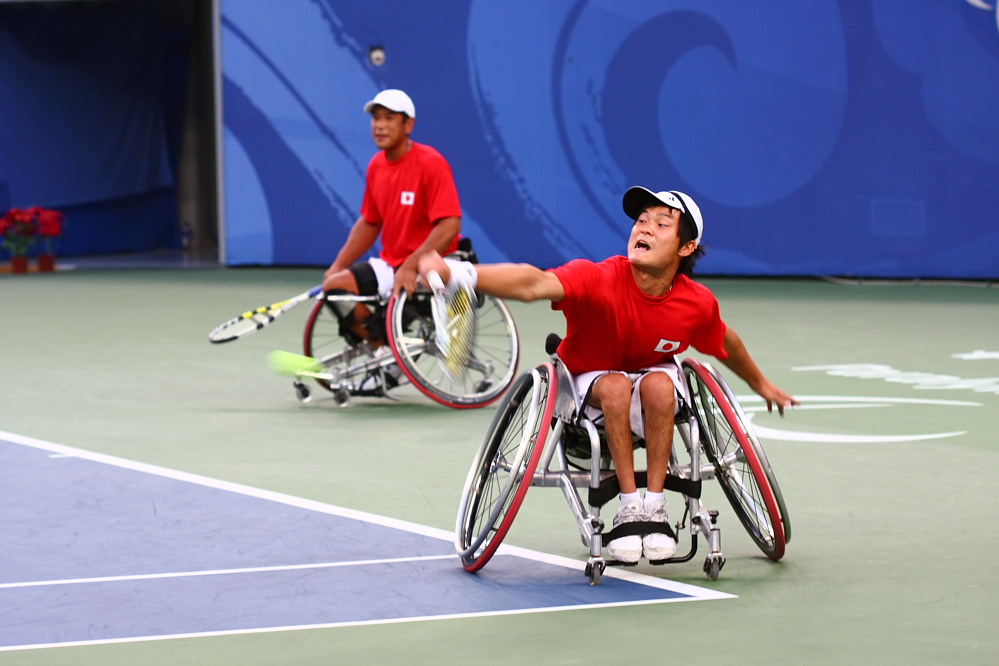
Wheelchair tennis requires agility. These Paralympic players use highly manoeuvrable chairs that can change direction very rapidly

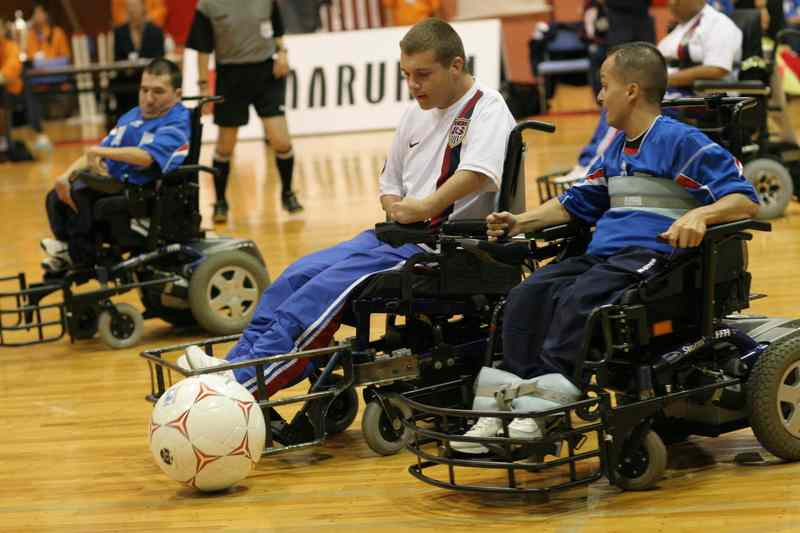
Powerchair football, also called "power soccer", uses an attachment over the footrest of a power wheelchair to bump or push the ball.

== Prosthetics ==
Prosthetic devices come in a variety of designs suited to different athletic purposes. Prosthetic legs may be designed for rock climbing, running, or jumping. The technology is designed to attain goals, such as greater gait efficiency when running. The technology is constantly improving to meet the demands of athletes who set ever-higher sports challenges for themselves.

In 2008, the International Association of Athletics Federations (IAAF) began a worldwide debate when they established Rule 144.2(e), prohibiting the use of technical devices that offer a competitive advantage. South African athlete Oscar Pistorius, using energy-storing prosthetic legs, fought for the right to run against able-bodied athletes in the 2008 Olympic and Paralympic Games, and won the right to compete, although he did not meet the qualifying time required for the traditional able-bodied competitions.

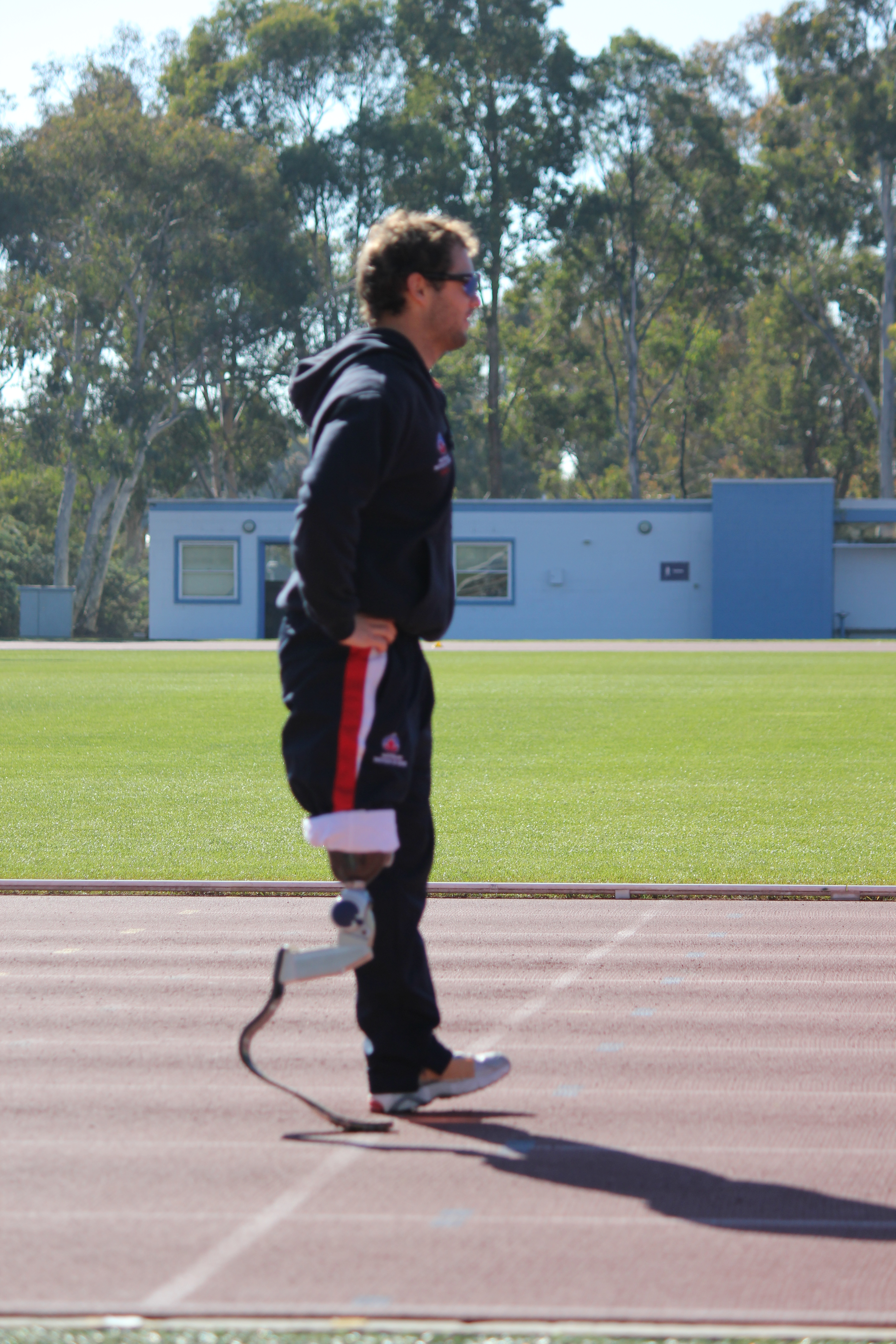
A Paralympic track athlete walks with a prosthetic leg designed for racing.

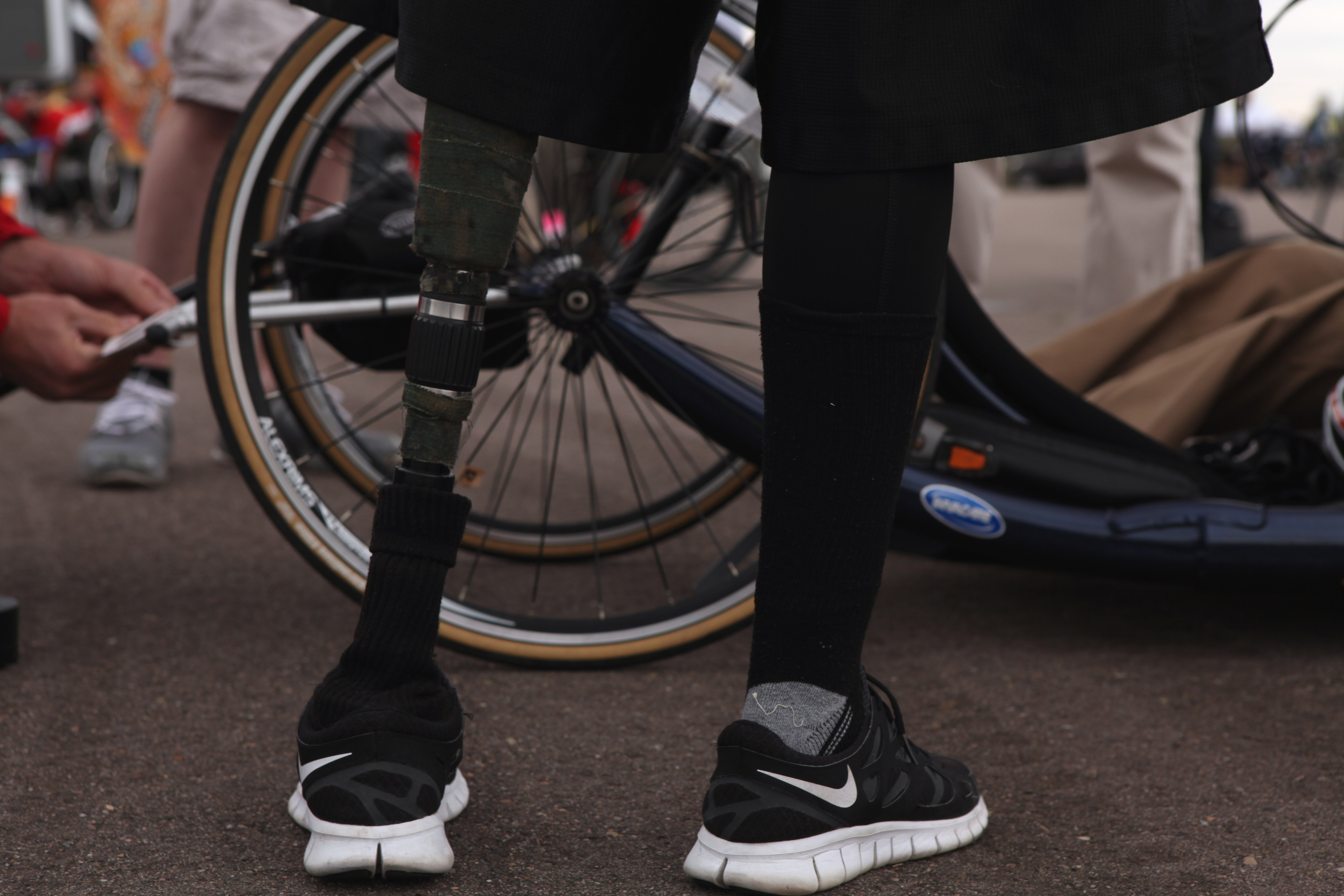
A prosthetic leg designed for bicycle racing. Adaptations can attach the prosthetic foot to the pedal during riding.

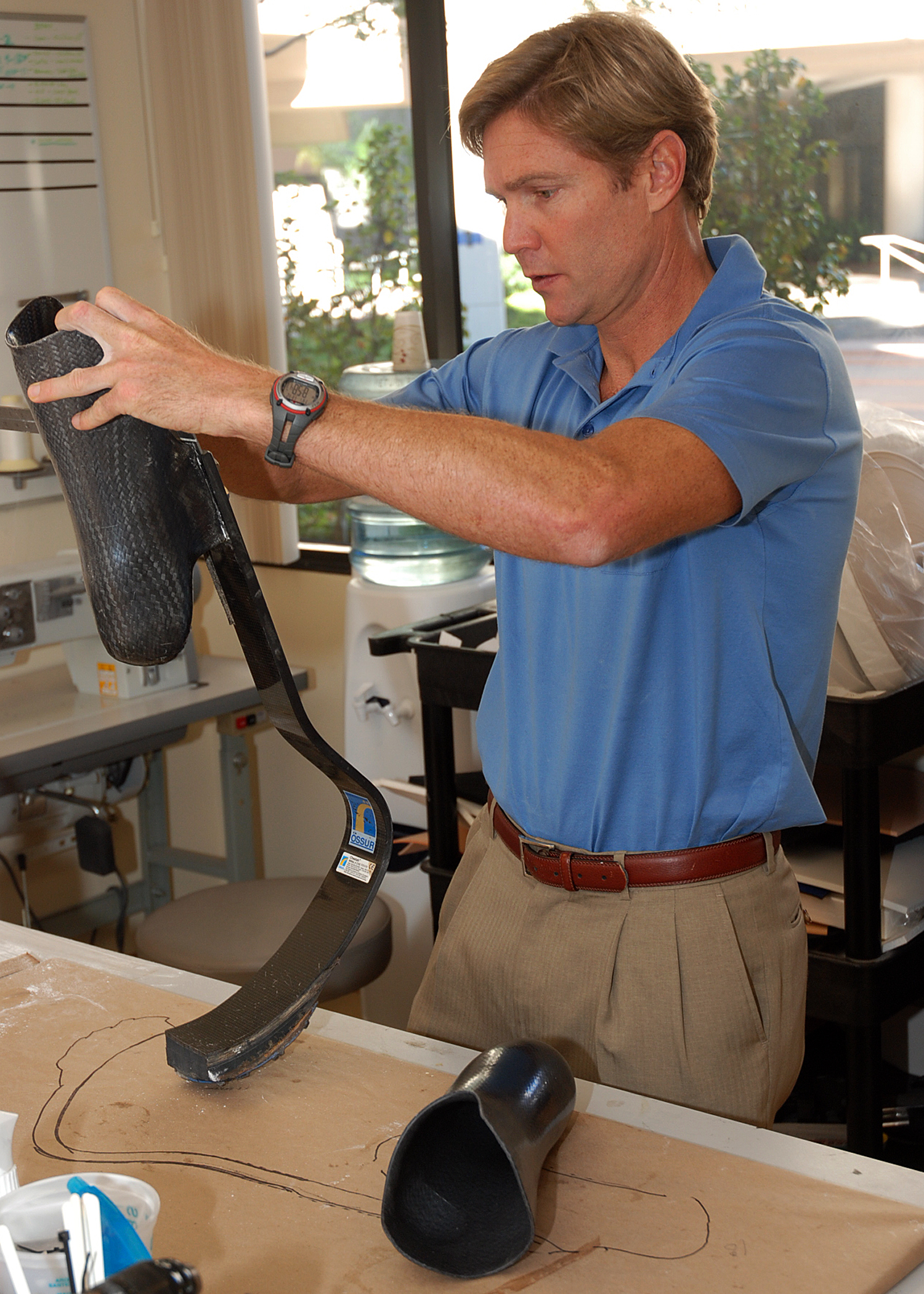
The Prosthetics Division at Naval Medical Center San Diego, configures a custom-built Cheetah high-performance carbon fiber foot designed for sprinting.

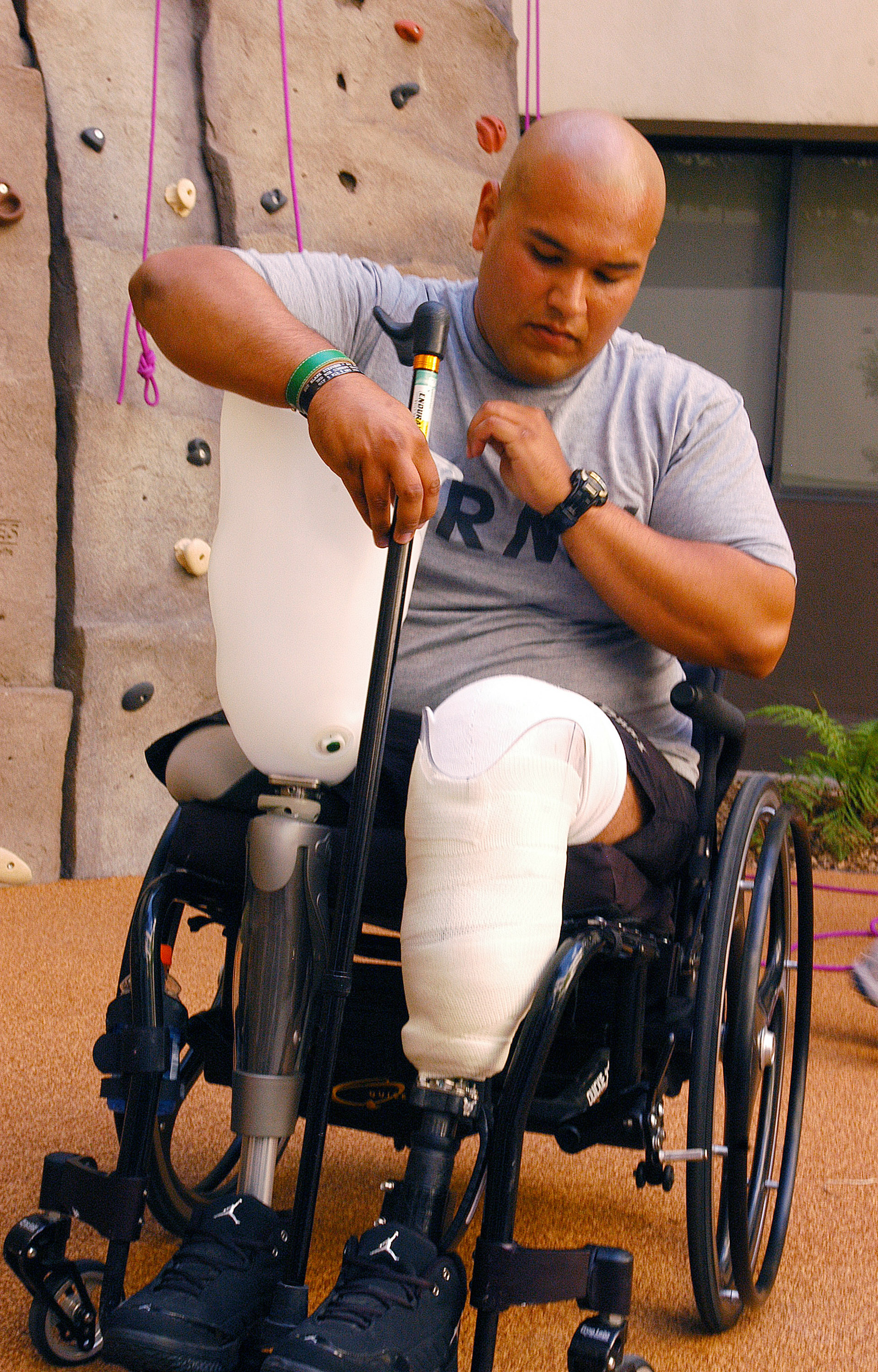
Climbing a rock wall is made more accessible with specially designed prosthetic legs.

== Functional classification ==
Functional classification systems are used to evaluate and categorize athletes in elite sports. The classification determines the type and extent of assistive technology use by the athlete.

== Organizations ==
Organizations and associations at the national and international level support the development of adaptive sport and recreation, often through the use of assistive technology for players. These organizations are "growing in number and scope".

- International Paralympic Committee - the global body responsible for many sports up to international elite level competition.
- Disabled Sports USA - The national organization that provides over 40 different adaptive sports to over 60,000 people with disabilities in the US through a network of over 100 community-based chapters.
- Adapted Physical Activity Council (APAC), a council of the American Association for Physical Activity and Recreation

== Obstacles ==
Assistive technology has made sports accessible to many athletes who would have otherwise not been able to play. However, it has its downfalls. This technology is expensive, so many people will never have access to it. It can be subject to abuse, as some people use the technology when they don't actually need it. There have been rulings that athletes who use assistive technology have an advantage over "able-bodied" athletes.

== See also ==
- Assistive technology
- Inclusive recreation
- Paralympics
