= Inclusive recreation =

Recreational activities accessible to disabled people

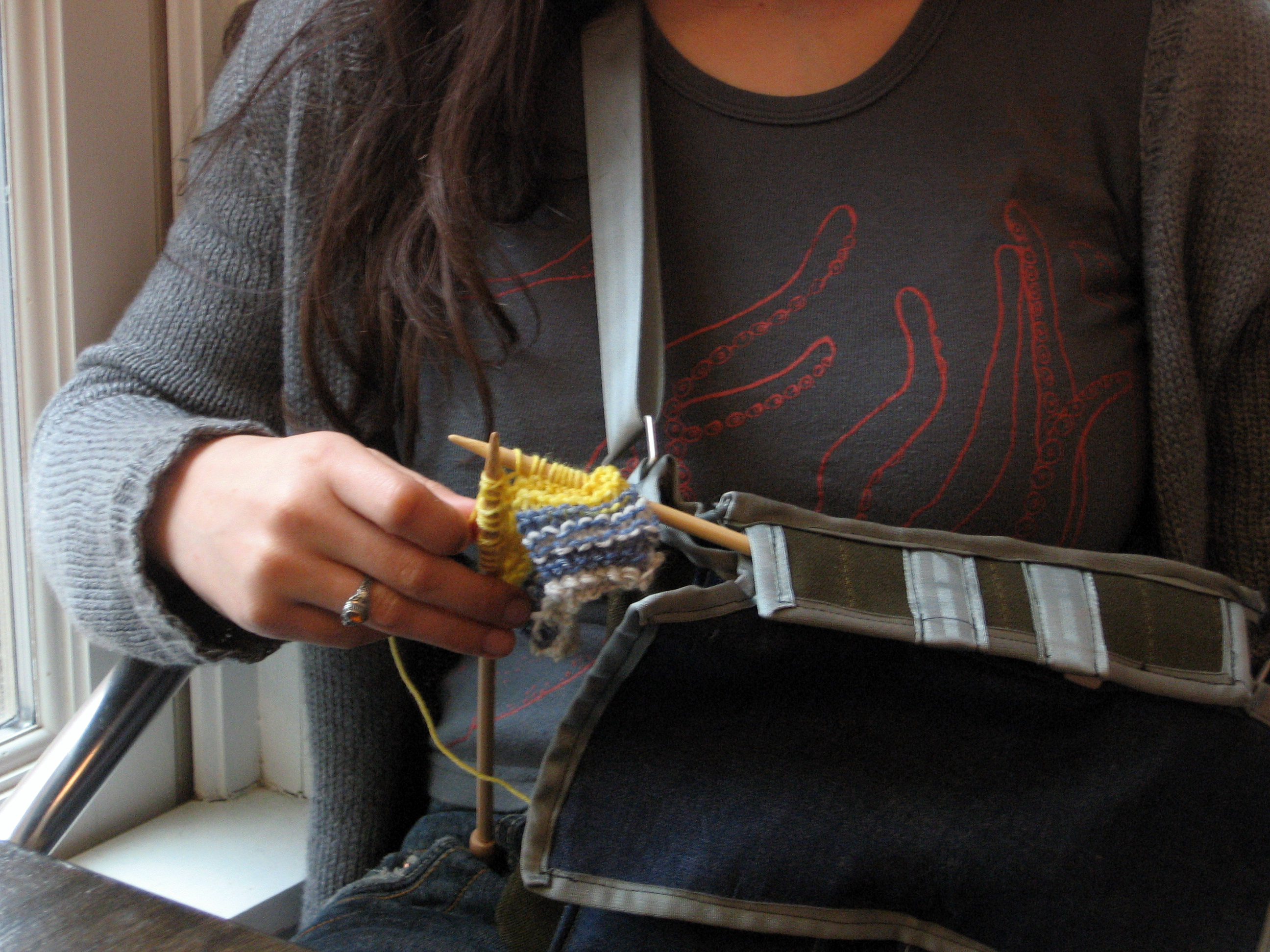
A knitter using an "Indi Knit" adaptive device to hold one knitting needle.

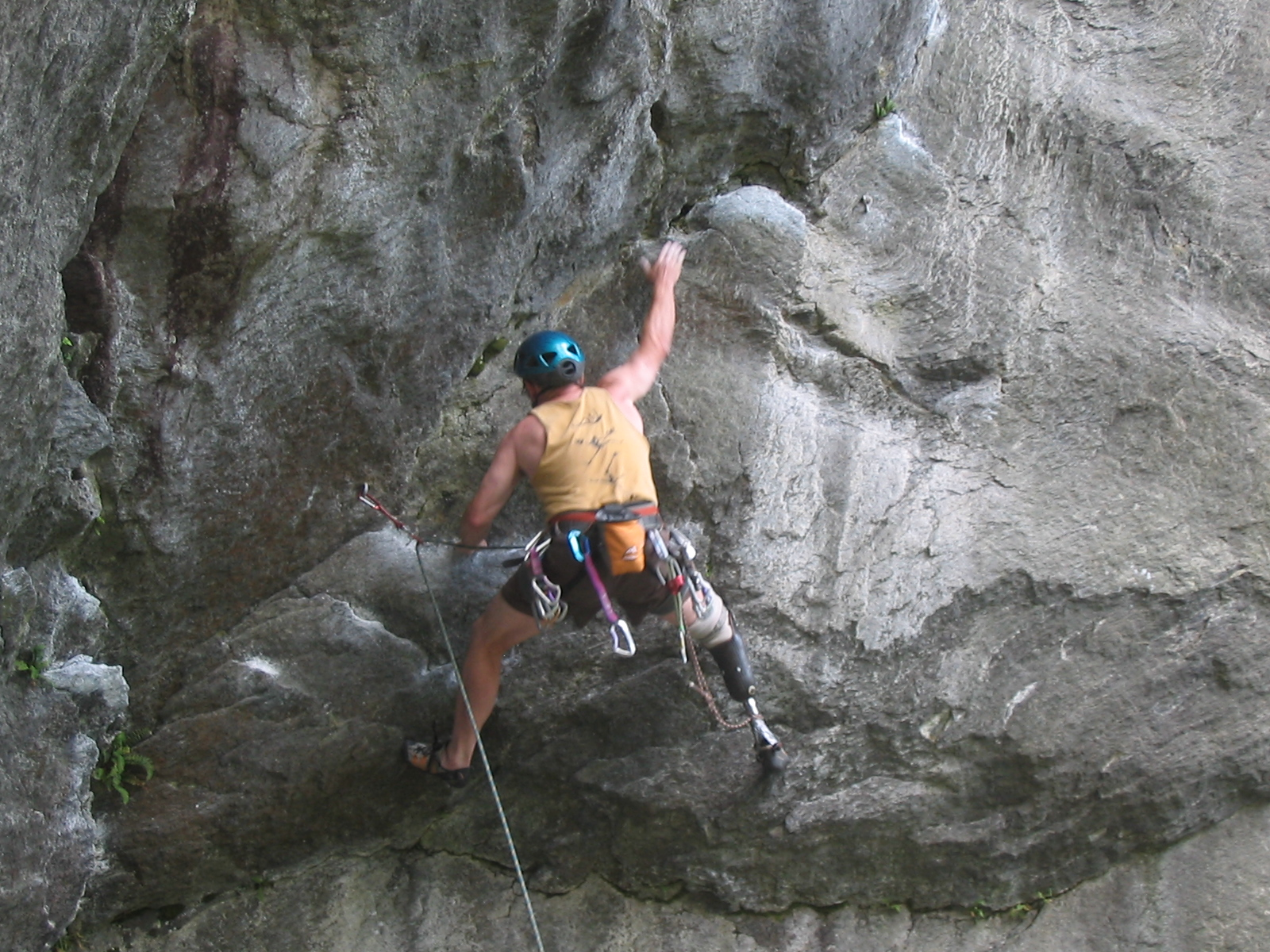
A rock climber using a prosthetic leg designed for the sport.

Inclusive recreation, also known as adaptive or accessible recreation, is a concept whereby people with disabilities are given the opportunity to participate in recreational activities. Through the use of activity modifications and assistive technology, athletes or participants in sports or other recreational pursuits are able to play alongside their non-disabled peers. The Boy Scouts of America, for example, has about 100,000 physically or mentally disabled members throughout the United States.

== Adaptive methods ==
=== Activity modifications ===
Activity modifications are changes made to a game or activity that allow all players to have an equal or more equal chance of doing well. One example of an activity modification is a wheelchair basketball game, where players use wheelchairs. The players' inability to walk is not a factor in how well they play.

=== Assistive devices ===
Assistive devices are any machines or equipment used to level the playing field in a mixed-ability competition, or to allow someone the opportunity to participate that could not do so without its benefit. Good examples of assistive devices are swimming pool lifts that lower non-ambulatory swimmers into a pool, and standing frames that allow wheelchair users to stand up while playing ball. Many municipal governments in the U.S. use adaptive recreation as a way to meet the requirements of the Americans With Disabilities Act (ADA), specifically its section dealing with public services. Governments are required by ADA law to provide reasonable accommodation to people with disabilities in order to allow them participation in sports and recreation programs.

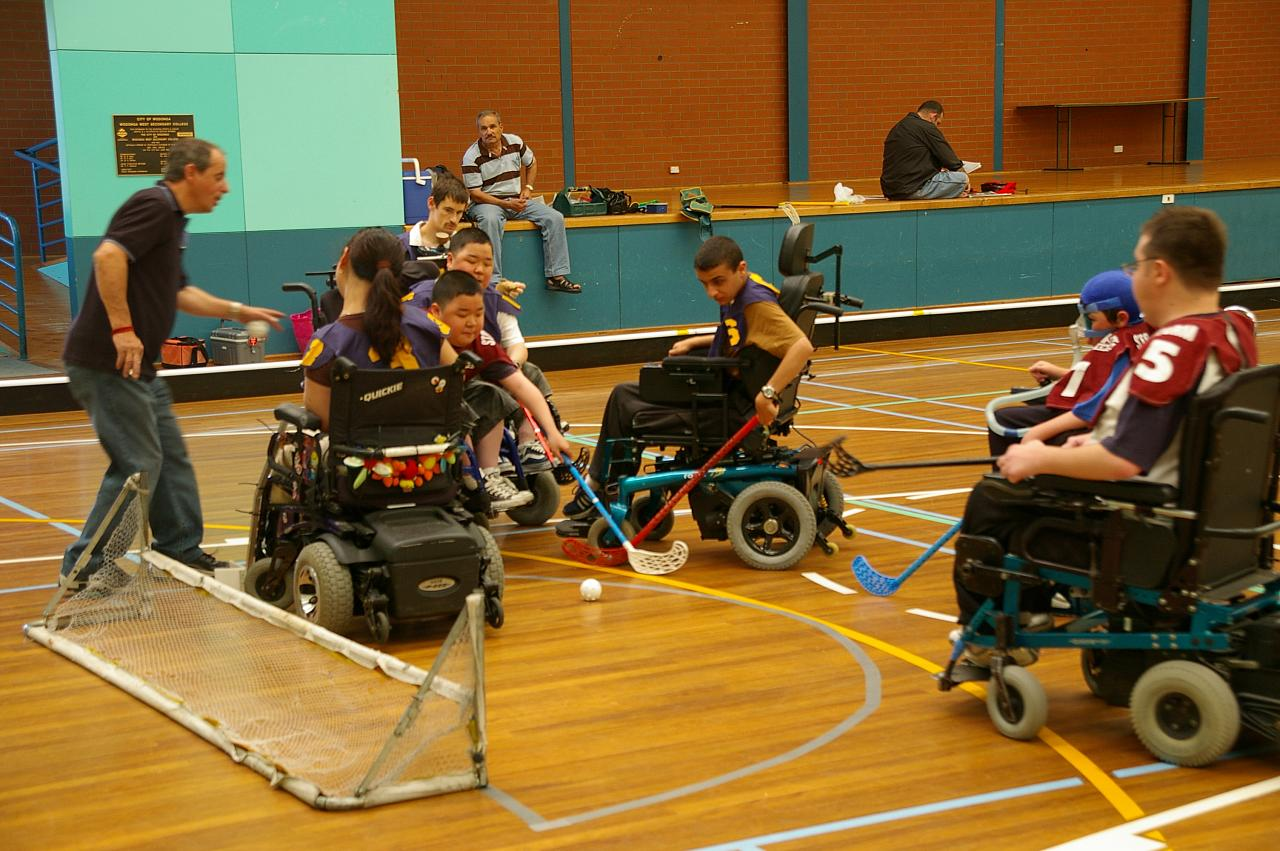
1. Activity modification for ball hockey.

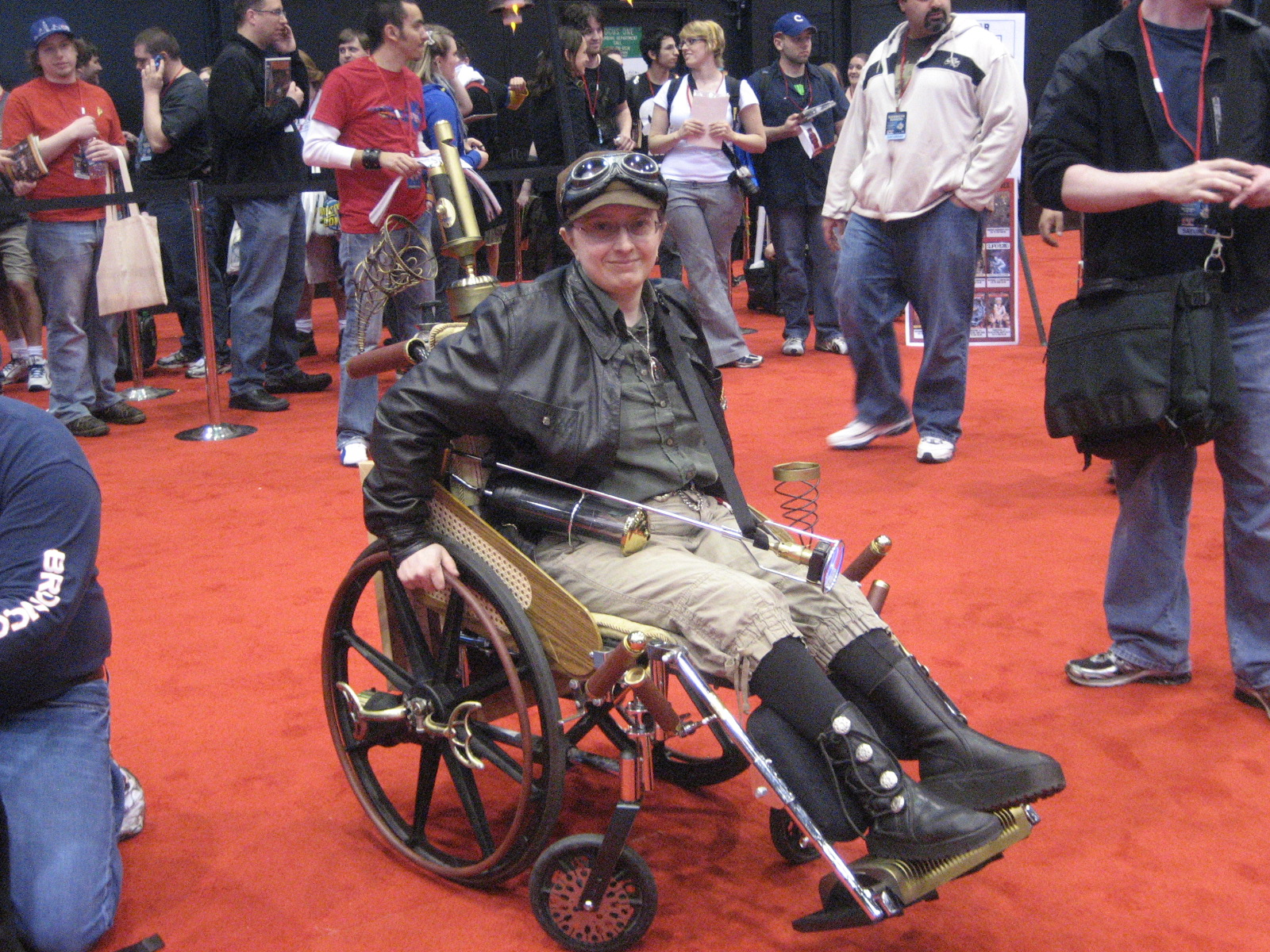
2. A steampunk-styled wheelchair.

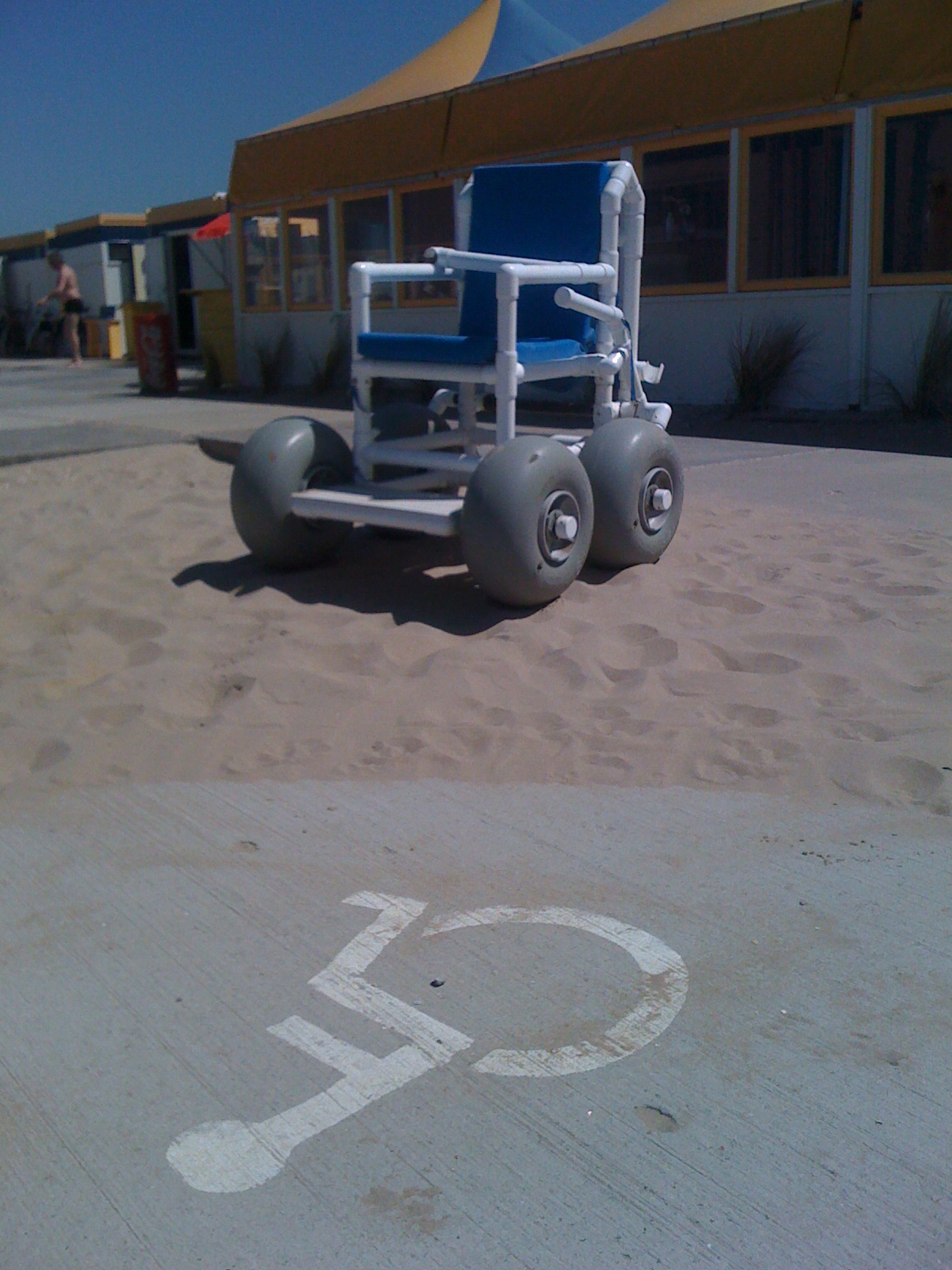
3. A wheelchair designed for beach use.

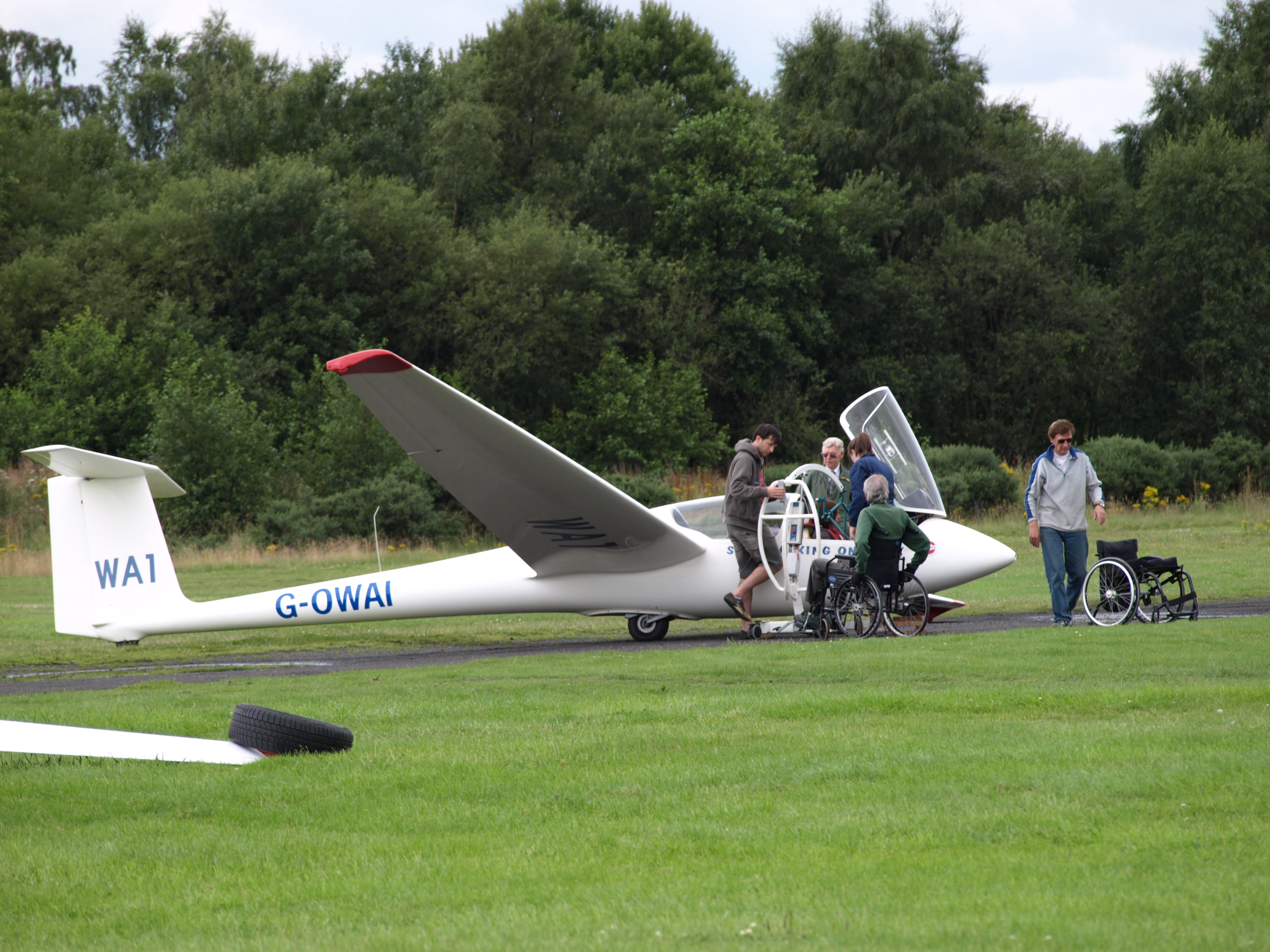
4. Glider pilots leave their wheelchairs behind.

1. "Power hockey" is shown, played using electric wheelchairs in a gymnasium, and low nets.
2. Shown is a steampunk-style wheelchair decorated by the user, at a comic fans' convention, Comic Con.
3. Sandy beaches and snow-covered parks can be made accessible to wheelchairs with specially designed wide wheels. Some facilities rent them to users, such as this example in the Netherlands.
4. Some activities require few modifications. Here, wheelchair users participate in glider flying as pilots, at Portmoak Airfield, Scotlandwell, Scotland, UK.

== Programs and models ==
Some organizations have the means to establish large programs for many participants in an activity. A plan for creating inclusive recreation may include staff training on inclusive practices, the purchase or construction of universally-accessible equipment, and tracking success and addressing further accessibility needs as they arise. A variety of inclusion concepts and models exist, which may focus on inclusive recreation program content, or on the processes of inclusion themselves. These include the Cincinnati Model for Inclusion, the Supportive Recreation Inclusion (SRI) Model, the Together We Play (TWP) service-delivery model, and the CITI Model, among many others.

Staff training is a crucial step in managing the success of an inclusive recreation program. A lack of awareness on the part of staff can have a negative impact on recreation participants; for example, assuming inappropriately that a person with a visual-impairment needs to be spoken to in a loud and slow voice can result in the participant disengaging from the activity. Training recommendations may include addressing both negative attitudes and behaviours through "personal contact and interaction", by working with people with disabilities. Staff are encouraged to promote "self-determination" among recreation participants, which "increases a person's learning and sense of competence".

== Therapeutic recreation ==
Therapeutic recreation is intended to help a patient adapt to a chronic disabling condition. A certified therapeutic recreation specialist uses their specialized training, along with professional standards, to develop programs that can accommodate the particular needs of patients. Therapeutic recreation may be part of a school's special education programming, or it may be part of a hospital's, community's, or organization's programs. Janet Pomeroy was one of the first to pioneer this type of activity, when she opened the Recreation Center for the Handicapped in 1952.

== Adaptive recreation for children ==
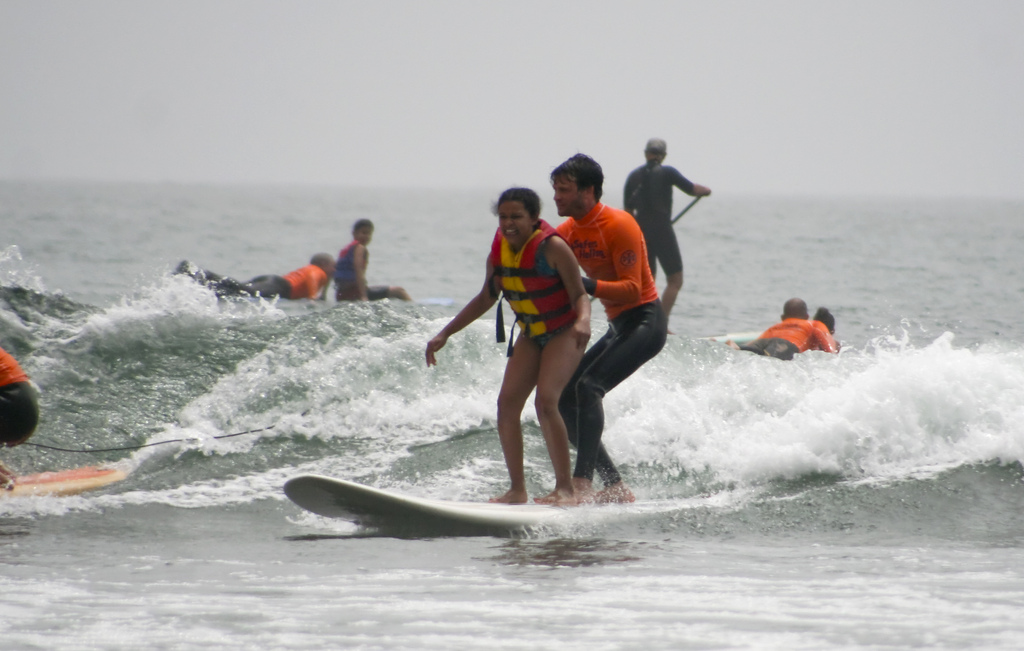
1. Assisted surfing

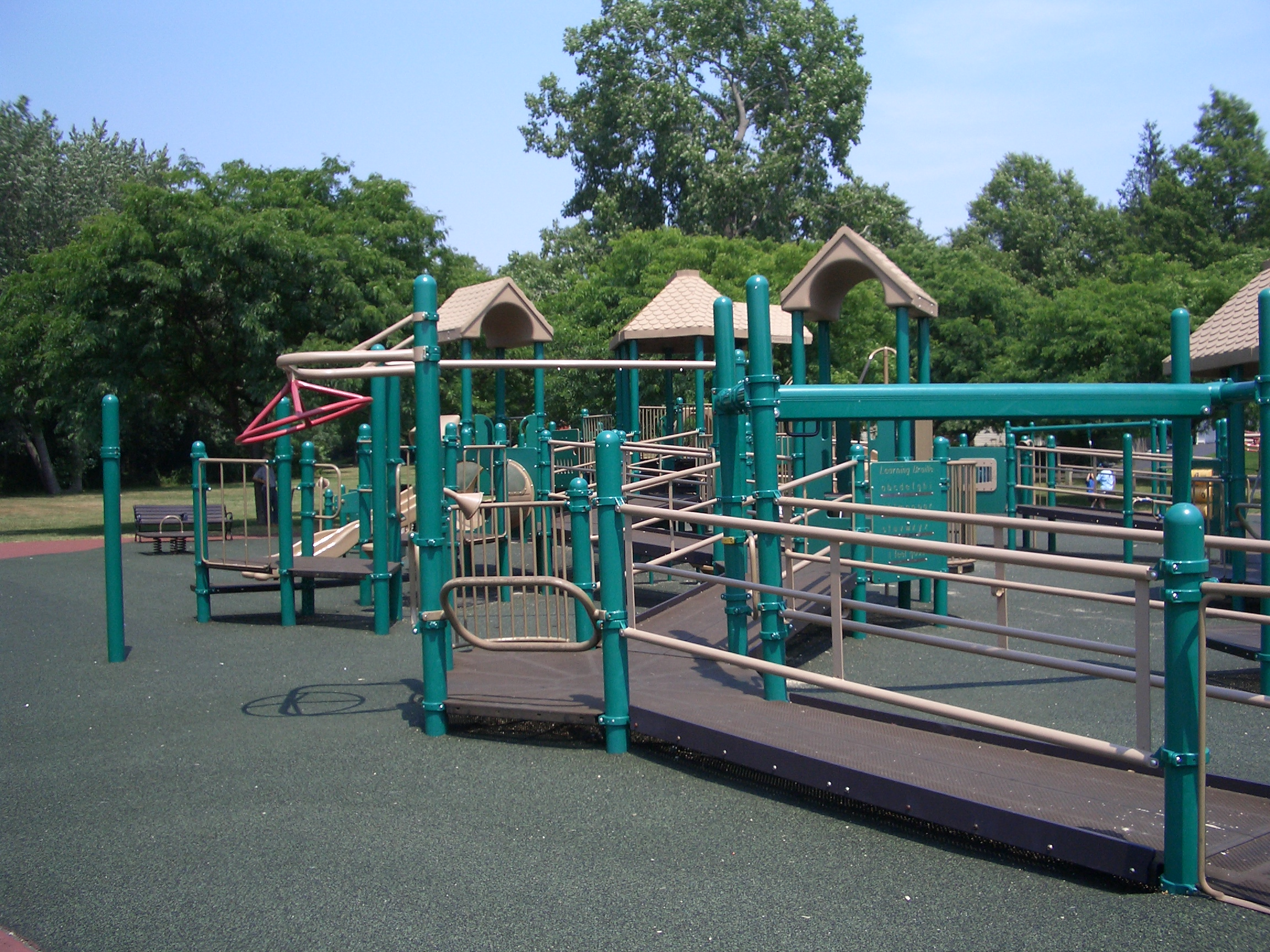
2. Accessible playground equipment

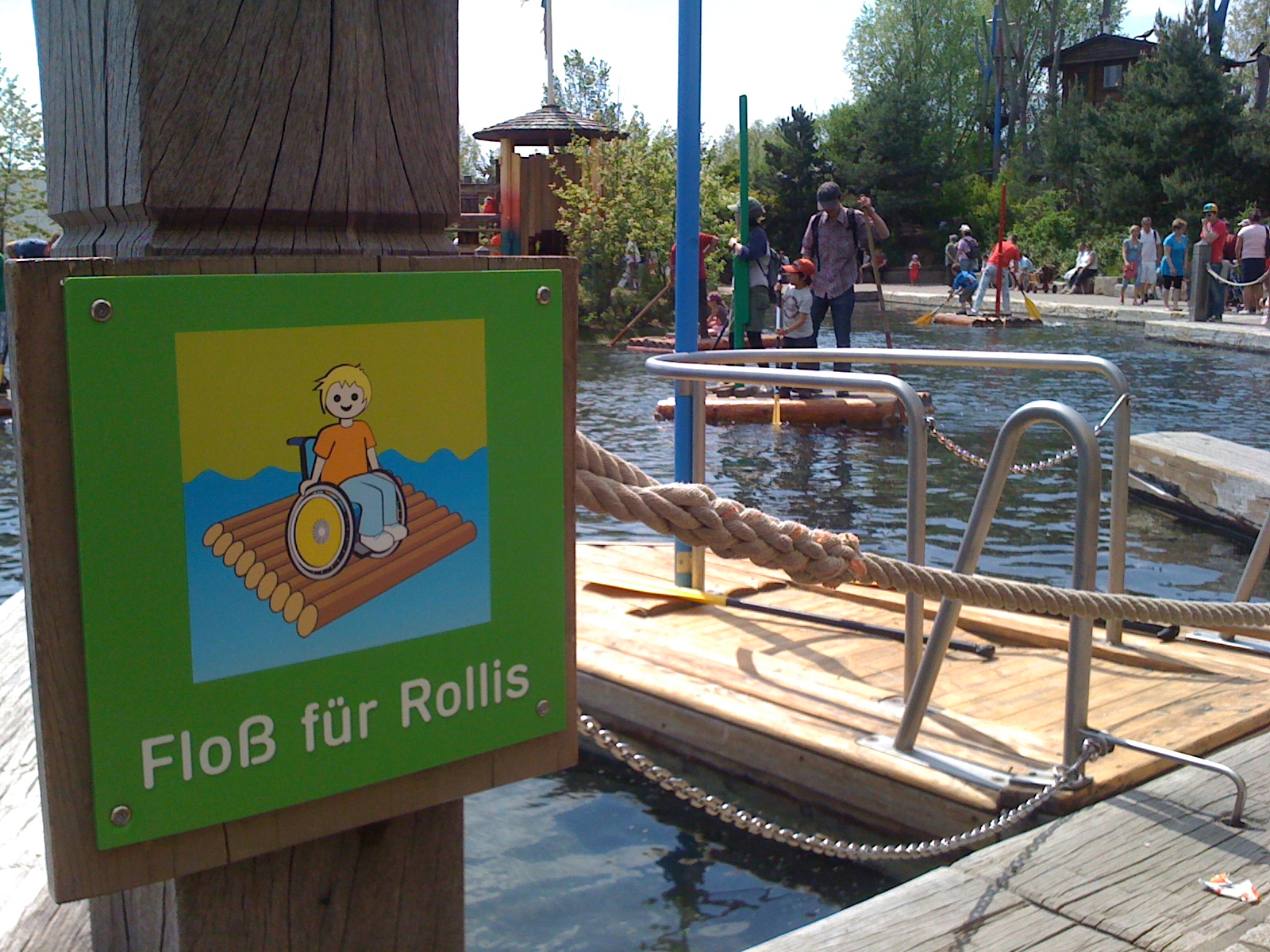
3. A raft designed for transporting wheelchairs.

1. Children with autism spectrum disorders learn to surf with the assistance of trained surfers. 2010 Surfer's Healing Malibu event, Surfrider Beach, California.
2. Playground equipment can be accessible for wheelchairs, with ramps as shown, and other equipment.
3. A floating raft for wheelchair users at the Playmobil Fun Park near Nuremberg, Germany, allows children using wheelchairs to participate in waterpark activities.

== See also ==
- Assistive technology in sport
- Disabled Sports USA
