= 2024 Kerala School Sports Meet =

Multi-sport event in Kerala, India

Kerala School Sports Meet 2024
- Host city: Kochi
- Athletes: 24,000
- Events: 39
- Opening: 4 November 2024
- Closing: 11 November 2024
- Opened by: V. Sivankutty; Minister for General Education
- Closed by: Pinarayi Vijayan; Chief Minister of Kerala
- Torch lighter: P. R. Sreejesh
- Main venue: Maharaja's College Stadium
- Website: Official Website

The Kerala School Sports Meet 2024 (Malayalam: കേരള സ്കൂൾ കായികമേള 2024), marked the first edition of the revamped Kerala State School Athletics and Games, which were held annually until 2023.

The event was held in Kochi from November 4 to 11. It officially began on November 4 with Olympian P. R. Sreejesh lighting the ceremonial lamp, accompanied by Thakkudu, the event's mascot. Actor Mammootty attended as the chief guest at the opening ceremony.

At the conclusion of the event on 11 November 2024, Thiruvananthapuram district claimed the title of overall district champion at the sports meet, with Thrissur and Malappuram districts securing second and third place, respectively. The closing ceremony took place at Maharaja's College Stadium, where Kerala Chief Minister Pinarayi Vijayan presented the trophy.

== Background ==
The Kerala School Sports Meet is a multi-sport event organized by the Kerala Public Education Department. It is a revamped version of the traditional state school sports festival, adopting an Olympic-style format and scheduled to take place every four years.

From the 4.5 million students enrolled in schools under the Public Education Department, 24,000 athletes are participating in the event, which aims to promote physical education and sports at the grassroots level. The competition includes both day and night matches, hosted at 17 venues throughout the city.

For the first time, students from the Gulf region are participating in the Kerala School Sports Meet. A circular from the Director of Public Education invited non-resident students to take part. The United Arab Emirates team is competing as the 15th district in the games, with only boys participating this year. From the next edition, girls will also be included. Six out of the eight UAE schools following the Kerala syllabus took part in the 2024 event. Going forward, non-resident students will be eligible to compete in all categories. In 2024, these students participated in sports such as athletics, football, volleyball, basketball, and badminton. While the students' travel expenses were covered by their respective schools, the state government provided accommodation, meals, and local training support.

On October 29, Olympic medallist and hockey player P. R. Sreejesh was named the ambassador for the Kerala School Sports Meet. Education Minister V. Sivankutty made the announcement, confirming that the opening ceremony will take place on November 4 at Maharaja's College Ground, following a venue change from Jawaharlal Nehru Stadium in Kaloor due to technical issues.

== Medal table ==
=== Overall champions ===
After tallying the total points earned across athletics, aquatics, and games categories by all 14 participating districts, Thiruvananthapuram district emerged as the overall champion of the 2024 edition, securing 1,935 points. Thrissur district claimed the first runner-up position with 848 points, while Malappuram district finished as the second runner-up with 824 points.

District

| Rank | District | Medals awarded | | | Points |
| Rank | District | 1st place, gold medalist(s) | 2nd place, silver medalist(s) | 3rd place, bronze medalist(s) | Points |
|---|---|---|---|---|---|
| 1 | Thiruvananthapuram | 227 | 150 | 164 | 1935 |
| 2 | Thrissur | 80 | 65 | 99 | 848 |
| 3 | Malappuram | 64 | 90 | 138 | 824 |
| 4 | Palakkad | 57 | 69 | 117 | 761 |
| 5 | Kannur | 71 | 63 | 71 | 711 |
| 6 | Ernakulam | 55 | 73 | 80 | 645 |
| 7 | Kozhikode | 47 | 67 | 82 | 608 |
| 8 | Kollam | 27 | 21 | 49 | 317 |
| 9 | Kottayam | 20 | 29 | 41 | 278 |
| 10 | Kasaragod | 28 | 24 | 32 | 270 |
| 11 | Alappuzha | 15 | 29 | 37 | 232 |
| 12 | Wayanad | 16 | 21 | 48 | 199 |
| 13 | Idukki | 12 | 13 | 21 | 120 |
| 14 | Pathanamthitta | 1 | 5 | 16 | 47 |

=== Event category ===
By the conclusion of the event on November 11, 2024, Malappuram district claimed the championship title in the athletics category, while Thiruvananthapuram district emerged as the overall champion in both the aquatics and games categories.

Athletics
Aquatics
Games

Completion Status: 98 out of 98 Events
| Rank | District | Medals awarded | | | Points |
| Rank | District | 1st place, gold medalist(s) | 2nd place, silver medalist(s) | 3rd place, bronze medalist(s) | Points |
|---|---|---|---|---|---|
| 1 | Malappuram | 22 | 32 | 24 | 247 |
| 2 | Palakkad | 25 | 13 | 18 | 213 |
| 3 | Ernakulam | 8 | 9 | 5 | 73 |
| 4 | Kozhikode | 7 | 6 | 10 | 72 |
| 5 | Thiruvananthapuram | 9 | 6 | 4 | 68 |
| 6 | Alappuzha | 1 | 3 | 2 | 16 |
| 7 | Kasargod | 6 | 2 | 2 | 38 |
| 8 | Kannur | 4 | 2 | 5 | 38 |
| 9 | Kottayam | 3 | 4 | 4 | 37 |
| 10 | Thrissur | 3 | 1 | 10 | 34 |
| 11 | Idukki | 1 | 6 | 4 | 27 |
| 12 | Kollam | 0 | 5 | 3 | 21 |
| 13 | Wayanad | 2 | 2 | 2 | 18 |
| 14 | Pathanamthitta | 0 | 1 | 2 | 5 |

Completion Status: 103 out of 103 Events
| Rank | District | Medals awarded | | | Points |
| Rank | District | 1st place, gold medalist(s) | 2nd place, silver medalist(s) | 3rd place, bronze medalist(s) | Points |
|---|---|---|---|---|---|
| 1 | Thiruvananthapuram | 74 | 56 | 60 | 654 |
| 2 | Ernakulam | 13 | 21 | 12 | 162 |
| 3 | Kottayam | 8 | 10 | 6 | 90 |
| 4 | Thrissur | 4 | 8 | 14 | 70 |
| 5 | Palakkad | 0 | 4 | 10 | 26 |
| 6 | Kozhikode | 2 | 2 | 0 | 16 |
| 7 | Malappuram | 1 | 1 | 1 | 9 |
| 8 | Kollam | 1 | 0 | 0 | 5 |
| 9 | Kasargod | 0 | 1 | 0 | 3 |
| —N/a | Alappuzha | 0 | 0 | 0 | 0 |
| —N/a | Idukki | 0 | 0 | 0 | 0 |
| —N/a | Kannur | 0 | 0 | 0 | 0 |
| —N/a | Pathanamthitta | 0 | 0 | 0 | 0 |
| —N/a | Wayanad | 0 | 0 | 0 | 0 |

Completion Status: 526 out of 529 Events
| Rank | District | Medals awarded | | | Points |
| Rank | District | 1st place, gold medalist(s) | 2nd place, silver medalist(s) | 3rd place, bronze medalist(s) | Points |
|---|---|---|---|---|---|
| 1 | Thiruvananthapuram | 144 | 88 | 100 | 1213 |
| 2 | Thrissur | 73 | 56 | 75 | 744 |
| 3 | Kannur | 67 | 61 | 66 | 673 |
| 4 | Malappuram | 41 | 57 | 113 | 568 |
| 5 | Palakkad | 32 | 52 | 89 | 522 |
| 6 | Kozhikode | 38 | 59 | 72 | 520 |
| 7 | Ernakulam | 34 | 43 | 63 | 410 |
| 8 | Kollam | 26 | 16 | 46 | 291 |
| 9 | Kasaragod | 22 | 21 | 30 | 229 |
| 10 | Wayanad | 14 | 19 | 46 | 181 |
| 11 | Alappuzha | 9 | 23 | 34 | 170 |
| 12 | Kottayam | 9 | 15 | 31 | 151 |
| 13 | Idukki | 11 | 7 | 17 | 93 |
| 14 | Pathanamthitta | 1 | 4 | 14 | 42 |

=== Inclusive category ===
The inclusive sports event for children with special needs concluded on November 5, featuring participation from over 1,600 students representing all 14 districts. The following events were held under this category: 100-meter race for the visually impaired, mixed 4 × 100 metres relay, standing broad jump, standing throw, handball, and mixed badminton.

By the end of the event, Thiruvananthapuram emerged as the overall champions, with Palakkad securing second place and Kozhikode taking third.

Overall Champions
Athletics
Games

Completion Status: 6 out of 6 Events
| Rank | District | Medals awarded | | | Points |
| Rank | District | 1st place, gold medalist(s) | 2nd place, silver medalist(s) | 3rd place, bronze medalist(s) | Points |
|---|---|---|---|---|---|
| 1 | Thiruvananthapuram | 7 | 4 | 0 | 54 |
| 2 | Palakkad | 5 | 3 | 3 | 54 |
| 3 | Kozhikode | 2 | 3 | 5 | 46 |
| 4 | Thrissur | 2 | 3 | 0 | 32 |
| 5 | Wayanad | 3 | 2 | 0 | 26 |
| 6 | Ernakulam | 2 | 0 | 1 | 12 |
| 7 | Kasargod | 1 | 0 | 1 | 11 |
| 8 | Kottayam | 0 | 3 | 0 | 12 |
| 9 | Malappuram | 0 | 1 | 3 | 10 |
| 9 | Pathanamthitta | 0 | 1 | 3 | 10 |
| 10 | Alappuzha | 0 | 0 | 2 | 2 |
| 12 | Kannur | 0 | 0 | 1 | 2 |
| 12 | Kollam | 0 | 0 | 1 | 2 |
| 14 | Idukki | 0 | 0 | 0 | 0 |

Completion Status: 10 out of 10 Events
| Rank | District | Medals awarded | | | Points |
| Rank | District | 1st place, gold medalist(s) | 2nd place, silver medalist(s) | 3rd place, bronze medalist(s) | Points |
|---|---|---|---|---|---|
| 1 | Palakkad | 4 | 3 | 0 | 38 |
| 2 | Thiruvananthapuram | 2 | 3 | 1 | 34 |
| 3 | Wayanad | 3 | 2 | 0 | 26 |
| 4 | Kozhikode | 2 | 0 | 4 | 26 |
| 5 | Thrissur | 1 | 3 | 0 | 22 |
| 6 | Ernakulam | 2 | 0 | 1 | 12 |
| 7 | Pathanamthitta | 0 | 1 | 3 | 10 |
| 8 | Kottayam | 0 | 2 | 0 | 6 |
| 9 | Malappuram | 0 | 0 | 3 | 4 |
| 10 | Alappuzha | 0 | 0 | 2 | 2 |
| 11 | Kasaragod | 0 | 0 | 1 | 1 |
| 12 | Idukki | 0 | 0 | 0 | 0 |
| 12 | Kannur | 0 | 0 | 0 | 0 |
| 12 | Kollam | 0 | 0 | 0 | 0 |

Completion Status: 6 out of 6 Events
| Rank | District | Medals awarded | | | Points |
| Rank | District | 1st place, gold medalist(s) | 2nd place, silver medalist(s) | 3rd place, bronze medalist(s) | Points |
|---|---|---|---|---|---|
| 1 | Thiruvananthapuram | 3 | 1 | 0 | 36 |
| 2 | Kozhikode | 0 | 3 | 1 | 20 |
| 3 | Palakkad | 1 | 0 | 3 | 16 |
| 4 | Kasaragod | 1 | 0 | 0 | 10 |
| 5 | Thrissur | 1 | 0 | 0 | 10 |
| 6 | Malappuram | 0 | 1 | 0 | 6 |
| 7 | Kottayam | 0 | 1 | 0 | 6 |
| 8 | Kollam | 0 | 0 | 1 | 2 |
| 9 | Kannur | 0 | 0 | 1 | 2 |
| 10 | Alappuzha | 0 | 0 | 0 | 0 |
| 10 | Ernakulam | 0 | 0 | 0 | 0 |
| 10 | Idukki | 0 | 0 | 0 | 0 |
| 10 | Pathanamthitta | 0 | 0 | 0 | 0 |
| 10 | Wayanad | 0 | 0 | 0 | 0 |

== Development and preparations ==
=== Safety and security ===
Measures were taken to ensure the security and efficient management of the sports event. Special transport services were arranged, and 40 squads led by officials from Kerala Excise and Kerala Police were deployed to handle potential challenges. A central control room facilitated coordination between departments, while health services were available at all venues. Support was provided by agencies like KSEB and the Kerala Water Authority. Additionally, accommodation and sanitation facilities were arranged for participants.

=== Venues ===
The sports events for the Kerala School Sports Meet 2024 were held across various locations in Ernakulam district and its surrounding areas of Fort Kochi, Kadavanthra, Kalamassery, Kothamangalam, and Thoppumpady.

Below is a list of venues along with the events hosted at each location.

| Venue | Events |
|---|---|
| Rajiv Gandhi Indoor Stadium | Taekwondo, Tennis, Table tennis, Badminton, Karate, Kabaddi, Judo |
| Cochin University of Science and Technology | Powerlifting, Weightlifting |
| Maharaja's College Stadium Kochi | Athletics, Cross country running |
| St. Peter's College & St. Peter's Vocational and Higher Secondary School Kolenchery | Ball badminton, Volleyball, Wushu |
| MA College Kothamangalam | Water polo |
| Government Higher Secondary School, Panampilly Nagar | Football |
| Parade Ground, Fort Kochi | Softball, Tug of War |
| Veli Ground, Fort Kochi | Baseball, Throw ball |
| Sacred Heart Higher Secondary School, Thevara | Basketball, Handball |
| Ernakulam Town Hall | Fencing |
| Palace Oval, Tripunithura | Cricket |
| St. Paul's College Ground, Kalamassery | Cricket |
| Mahatma Gandhi Memorial Higher Secondary School Puthencruz | Handball |
| Government Boys Higher Secondary School, Tripunithura | Netball |
| Government Higher Secondary School Kadayiruppu | Boxing |
| Container Terminal Road, Vallarpadam | Cycling |
| Rajiv Gandhi Stadium Thoppumpady | Kho-Kho, Tennikoit |

=== Broadcast ===
The Kerala Infrastructure and Technology for Education (KITE) introduced technological solutions for the state school sports meet, including a dedicated portal and live broadcasts. A helicam captured cycling events on Container Road, providing real-time updates. Commentators from the Athletics Federation of India, such as Sreekumaran Nair, Griselda Xavier, Abhilash, Simi Maryam, and Mahesh, provided coverage for the Kite Victers channel.

== The Games ==
=== Opening ceremony ===
The opening ceremony of the event was held on 4 November 2024 in Kochi, following promotional processions from Kasaragod and Thiruvananthapuram. The ceremony commenced at 4:00 PM with the lighting of the ceremonial lamp by hockey player and brand ambassador P. R. Sreejesh, alongside Education Minister V. Sivankutty. Actor Mammootty inaugurated the cultural segment of the event.

The ceremony featured a student march past and various cultural performances by schoolchildren. Highlights included mass drills, Zumba routines, freehand exercises, and themed artistic displays reflecting local traditions such as the Cochin Carnival and Athachamayam.

A media coordination committee was formed by the Ernakulam Press Club to facilitate event coverage, with provisions for a dedicated media room at Maharaja's College, the main venue.

=== Mascot ===
The logo and mascot for the State School Sports Festival – Kochi'24 was unveiled, with "Thakkudu," a lively "Annarakannan" (squirrel), serving as the official mascot. The logo was designed by Rishi Kallada, while Vinoj Surendran created the mascot. The launch was officiated by Ministers P. Rajeeve and V. Sivankutty.

=== Trophy ===
The Kerala Education Department announced the institution of the Kerala State School Olympics Gold Cup, an award to be presented to the overall champions of the annual Kerala State School Olympics. Inspired by the trophy awarded at the Kerala State School Arts Festival, the Gold Cup is named in honour of the Chief Minister of Kerala and is intended as an Ever Rolling Trophy for the highest-scoring district.

Although the cup was planned for the inaugural edition in 2024, it was not presented due to time constraints. Officials have confirmed that it will be introduced in future editions of the event.

=== Closing ceremony ===
On November 11, 2024, Chief Minister Pinarayi Vijayan inaugurated the closing ceremony of the sports meet at the main venue, Ernakulam Maharaja's College ground. Education Minister V. Sivankutty presided over the event, with Indian footballer I.M. Vijayan and actor Vinayakan serving as the chief guests. During the ceremony, Sports Minister V. Abdurahiman, along with Ministers P. A. Mohammed Riyas, Kadannappalli Ramachandran, G. R. Anil, and J. Chinchu Rani, distributed the prizes. The district securing the top spot was awarded the Chief Minister's Ever-rolling Trophy. Trophies were also presented to the top three winners in the under-14, under-17, and under-19 categories, as well as for outstanding performances in athletics and aquatic competitions at the school and district levels.

== Challenges ==
Due to logistical challenges and technical difficulties at the Kochi venue, the scheduled competitions for the inaugural Kerala School Sports Meet 2024 is expected to face adjustments. Despite completing the sub-district, education district, and revenue district-level competitions in athletics and swimming by the October 10 deadline, the constraints in Kochi prevents several sports events from being held simultaneously as planned.

As a result, some events were relocated to alternative venues. Notably, the hockey matches, originally set to take place in Kochi starting from November 4, were shifted to Kollam for technical reasons. Competitions for Under-14, Under-17, and Under-19 boys and girls will now be held in Kollam from October 20 to 24.

=== Controversies ===
A protest erupted during the closing ceremony, led by students, teachers, and parents from Malappuram's Tirunavaya Navamukunda HSS and Kothamangalam's Mar Basil HSS. The protest centered around the inclusion of sports schools in the overall school rankings, sparking controversy over the final results. The dispute arose when GV Raja Sports School from Aruvikkara was awarded second place, despite allegedly not being listed in the initial rankings. Tensions escalated, leading to a scuffle between students and the police.

Navamukunda HSS and Mar Basil HSS expressed their dissatisfaction with the final points tally, in which Navamukunda ranked second with 44 points, and Mar Basil came third with 43 points, while GV Raja Sports School was controversially awarded second place.
