= Thrissur Aquatic Complex =

Swimming pool complex in Thrissur, Kerala, India

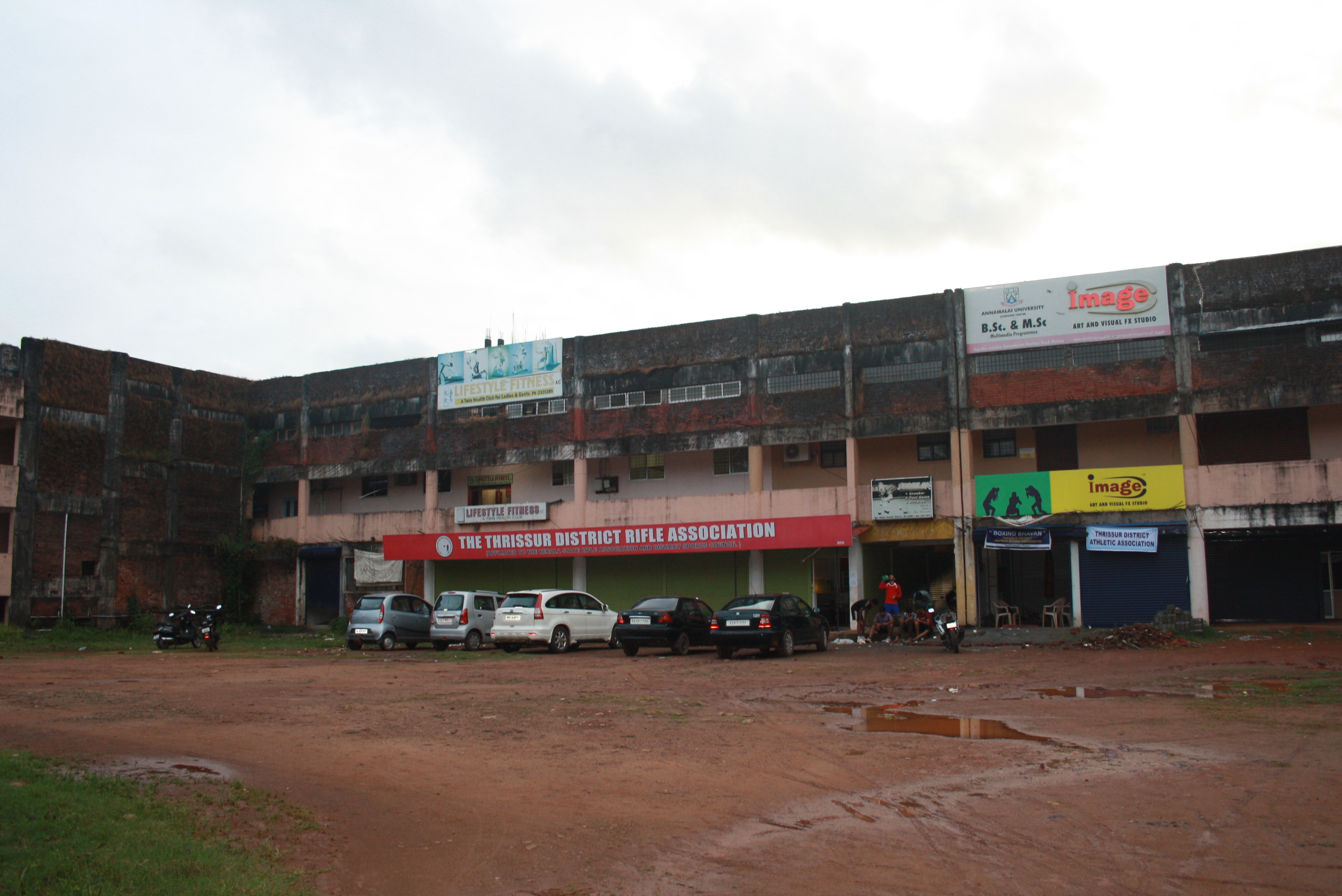
- Front view of the pool complex
- Full name: Thrissur Aquatic Complex
- Address: Thrissur, India
- Owner: Thrissur District Sports Council
- Capacity: 10,000

Construction
- Built: 1987
- Opened: 1987
- Architect: Professor C.S. Menon

Thrissur Aquatic Complex is a swimming pool complex situated in Thrissur city of Kerala in India.

== History ==
The complex was built in 1987 in three and half acres of land and was inaugurated by former Kerala Chief Minister K. Karunakaran. Vinod Rai, then Collector of Thrissur District was instrumental in building the aquatic complex. It was the second aquatic complex built in India after the 1982 Asian Games. National Games of 1987 was the first event held in the complex. Race pool, diving pool, indoor practice pool, gymnasium are the other facilities available in the complex.

== Events held ==
- National Games of India: 1987
- National Aquatic Championships (Organized by Railways): 1991
- All India Inter-Varsity Championships: 1992
- All India Inter-Varsity Championships: 1994
- 56th Senior National Aquatic Championships: 2002
