= P. R. Sreejesh =

Indian field hockey player (born 1988)

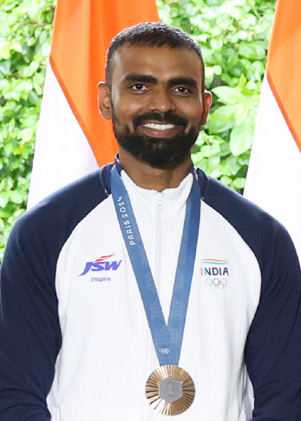
- Sreejesh in 2024

Personal information
- Full name: Parattu Raveendran Sreejesh
- Nickname: Great Wall of India
- Born: 8 May 1988 (age 38) Kochi, Kerala, India
- Field hockey career
- Height: 1.84 m (6 ft 0 in)
- Weight: 90 kg (198 lb)
- Sport: Field hockey
- Position: Goalkeeper
Senior career
Years	Team	Caps	Goals
2005–2011	Chandigarh Comets	17	0
2011–2013	Indian Overseas Bank	32	0
2013–2014	Mumbai Magicians	12	0
2015–2017	Uttar Pradesh Wizards	33	0
2017–2024	Physical Education & Sports Kerala	-	-
National team
Years	Team	Caps	Goals
2004–2006	India U21		-
2006–2024	India	336	(0)
Coaching career
- 2024–2026: India U21
Medal record
Men's field hockey
Representing India
Olympic Games
Bronze medal – third place	2020 Tokyo
Bronze medal – third place	2024 Paris
Pro League
Bronze medal – third place	2021–22 Rotterdam
World League
Bronze medal – third place	2014–15 Raipur
Champions Trophy
Silver medal – second place	2016 London
Silver medal – second place	2018 Breda
Hockey Series
Gold medal – first place	2018–19
Commonwealth Games
Silver medal – second place	2014 Glasgow
Silver medal – second place	2022 Birmingham
Asian Games
Gold medal – first place	2014 Incheon
Gold medal – first place	2022 Hangzhou
Bronze medal – third place	2018 Jakarta
Asian Indoor Games
Bronze medal – third place	2007 Macau
Asia Cup
Silver medal – second place	2013 Ipoh
Asian Champions Trophy
Gold medal – first place	2011 Ordos City
Gold medal – first place	2016 Kuantan
Gold medal – first place	2018 Muscat
Gold medal – first place	2023 Chennai
Silver medal – second place	2012 Doha
Junior Asia Cup
Gold medal – first place	2008 Hyderabad
Junior World Cup (as coach)
Bronze medal – third place	2025 Tamil Nadu

Parattu Raveendran Sreejesh (born 8 May 1988) is an Indian field hockey coach and former player. He captained the India national field hockey team and was a member of the squads that won bronze medals at the 2020 and 2024 Olympic Games. He received the FIH Men's Goalkeeper of the Year award in 2020, 2022, and 2024. Sreejesh was honoured with the Arjuna Award in 2015, Padma Shri in 2017, Khel Ratna in 2021, and Padma Bhushan in 2025 for his contributions to Indian field hockey. He served as the head coach of the Indian men's U21 team and Delhi SG Pipers in the Hockey India League. As head coach he guided the Indian team to win bronze at the 2025 FIH Junior World Cup in Tamil Nadu.

== Early life ==
Sreejesh was born 8 May 1988, in Kizhakkambalam, a suburb of Kochi in the state of Kerala, to P. V. Raveendran and Usha, a family of farmers. He completed his primary education in St. Antony's Lower Primary School in Kizhakkambalam. He studied until the sixth standard in St. Joseph's High School in Kizhakkambalam. His brother Sreejith lives in Canada.

As a child, he trained as a sprinter, before moving on to long jump and volleyball. At 12, he joined the G. V. Raja Sports School in Thiruvananthapuram. This was where his coach suggested that he take up goalkeeping. He became a professional after he was picked by hockey coach Jayakumar at the school, following which he played at the school before playing at the Nehru Cup. He completed his graduation in History from Sree Narayana College, Chempazhanthy, Kerala.

== Career ==
=== International career ===
Sreejesh made the Junior national team in 2004, in a match against Australia in Perth, in 2004. He made his debut in the senior national team in 2006, at the South Asian Games in Colombo. Following India's win at the 2008 Junior Asia Cup, he was awarded the 'Best Goalkeeper of the Tournament'. Having been a part of the Indian team for six years, though often losing his place to senior goalkeepers, Adrian D'Souza and Bharat Chettri, he has been a regular member since 2011, after saving two penalty stroke in the Asian Champions Trophy Final in Ordos City, China, against Pakistan, a match-winning performance. His second 'Best Goalkeeper of the Tournament' award came at the 2013 Asia Cup, with India finishing second in the tournament. He was a part of the team that won silver medals at the

Sreejesh had earlier played for India at the 2012 Summer Olympics in London, and then World Cup in 2014. At the 2014 Asian Games in Incheon, South Korea, he starred in Indian's gold medal win, when he saved two penalty strokes against Pakistan in the final. At the 2014 Champions Trophy and 2018 Champions Trophy, he was adjudged "Goalkeeper of the Tournament". Following impressive performances in 2014, he was nominated for the award of Best Male Goalkeeper; he eventually lost to Jaap Stockmann of the Netherlands. He was the captain of the team that won the silver medal at the 2016 Men's Hockey Champions Trophy held at London.

On 13 Jul 2016, Sreejesh took over as captain of the Indian hockey team from Sardar Singh. At the 2016 Olympics in Rio, Sreejesh led the Indian hockey team to the quarterfinals of the tournament .

At the Tokyo Olympics, on 5 August 2021, Sreejesh played a key role in defeating Germany to clinch the bronze medal for India, their first Olympic medal in hockey for 41 years. Sreejesh was a part of the team that won 2022 Commonwealth Games Silver, 2023 Asian Champion Trophy tite and 2022 Asian Games hockey gold medal.

He also played a key role in India's bronze medal-winning journey at the 2024 Summer Olympics in Paris. He retired from his international career post the Olympics games.

=== Club career ===
At the auction of the inaugural season of the Hockey India League, Sreejesh was bought by the Mumbai franchise for US$38,000. He played two seasons for their team, Mumbai Magicians. In 2014, he was bought by Uttar Pradesh Wizards for US$69,000 and since the 2015 season, has been playing for them. Sreejesh became the second Indian to win the "World Athlete of the Year" after Rani Rampal.

== Personal life ==
Sreejesh married his longtime girlfriend Aneeshya, a former long jumper and an Ayurveda doctor. Their daughter Anusree was born in 2014. Their son Sreeansh was born in 2017.

== Other activities ==
Sreejesh is currently employed as a joint director at the Government of Kerala's Department of General and Higher Education.

Sreejesh acted in many advertisement films and part of many reality shows, sports shows, podcasts, endorsements in the various medias including TV Channels and Social Media.

He is also involved in many social activities.

== Awards and nominations ==
Year	Award	Category	Result	Ref(s)
2014	FIH Awards	Male Goalkeeper of the Year	Nominated	
2016	FIH Awards	Male Goalkeeper of the Year	Nominated	
2017	Padma Sri	Distinguished Contribution in Sports	Won	
2020–2021	FIH Awards	Male Goalkeeper of the Year	Won	
2021	Khel Ratna Award	Spectacular Performance in the Field of Sports	Won	
2022	World Games Awards	Athlete of the Year	Won	
2022	FIH Awards	Male Goalkeeper of the Year	Won	
2024	FIH Awards	Male Goalkeeper of the Year	Won	
2025	Padma Bhushan	Distinguished Service of a High Order	Won	
2025	Hockey India Awards	Goalkeeper of the Year	Nominated	
