= Janet Pomeroy =

American advocate

- Born: Esther Janet Akers; 1911 or 1912
- Died: November 26, 2005 (aged 93); Hillsborough, California, U.S.

Janet Pomeroy (1911 or 1912 – November 26, 2005) was an American advocate for individuals with disabilities and the founder of one of the first recreation centers dedicated to providing inclusive opportunities for people with physical and developmental disabilities.

== Life ==
Born Esther Janet Akers, she was raised in a large family on a farm near San Antonio, Texas. At the age of 10, she contracted polio, which left her with a partially immobilized arm. After moving to Hillsborough, California, she volunteered with the Red Cross and began working with children who had cerebral palsy, an experience that inspired her to create her own recreation center in San Francisco. In Hillsborough, she also met and married Morris Pomeroy.

Pomeroy earned a bachelor's degree in recreation in 1953 and a master’s degree in therapeutic recreation in 1962, both from San Francisco State University. In the 1970s, she helped develop programs designed to assist disabled individuals transitioning from state institutions into more independent living arrangements, ultimately aiding more than 15,000 people.

Pomeroy was a devout Christian. She died in her sleep on November 26, 2005, at her home in Hillsborough, California, at the age of 93.

== Recreation Center for the Handicapped ==
In 1952, at a time when societal attitudes often confined disabled individuals to their homes or institutional care, Pomeroy pioneered the idea that they could engage in recreational activities. This belief led her to establish the Recreation Center for the Handicapped in San Francisco. Initially starting with just six children in a small room near Fleishhacker Pool, Pomeroy’s program quickly gained attention. As more families sought services for their disabled children, the center expanded, becoming a model for similar organizations across the country and internationally. The center offered its clients access to activities such as camping, swimming, horseback riding, painting, dancing, and theatre.

The center was renamed the Janet Pomeroy Center in 2003, and later renamed again to the Pomeroy Recreation and Rehabilitation Center. Since its founding, the center has provided recreational and vocational opportunities to thousands of children and adults with disabilities. As of 2003, the center served around 2,000 individuals each week. The facility, now located on a 5.5-acre site on Skyline Boulevard, includes a playground, theater, gymnasium, wheelchair-accessible pool and garden and employs more than 200 staff members.

== Awards and recognition ==
Pomeroy received numerous awards in recognition of her contributions, including an honorary degree from the University of California, San Francisco, the San Francisco State Alumni of the Year award, and the St. Francis of Assisi humanitarian service award.

== Publications ==
Pomeroy authored several publications, including the textbook Recreation for the Physically Handicapped (1964) and a memoir titled Among the Roses (1993).

=== Articles ===
- Pomeroy, Janet (December 1969). "Graduation in Recreation Program". Journal of Health, Physical Education, Recreation. 40 (9): 79–80. doi:10.1080/00221473.1969.10613933. ISSN 0022-1473.
- Pomeroy, Janet (February 1972). "Recreation for Severely Handicapped Persons in a Community Setting". Journal of Visual Impairment & Blindness. 66 (2): 50–58. doi:10.1177/0145482X7206600205. ISSN 0145-482X.
- Pomeroy, Janet (May 1975). "Recreation Unlimited: An Approach to Community Recreation for the Handicapped". Journal of Physical Education and Recreation. 46 (5): 30–31. doi:10.1080/00971170.1975.10610880. ISSN 0097-1170.
- Pomeroy, Janet (October 1977). "Outreach: An Approach to Serving the Leisure Needs of the Isolated Elderly". Journal of Physical Education and Recreation. 48 (8): 45–47. doi:10.1080/00971170.1977.10621148. ISSN 0097-1170.
