= Power hockey =

Electric wheelchair hockey sport

Power hockey, also known as powerchair hockey, is a competitive, fast-paced hockey game based on the use of a power wheelchair. The foundation of the sport derives from ice hockey and floor hockey, but with adapted rules to enable people with disabilities, who use a power wheelchair, to play and be active in a competitive team setting. The sport is also referred to as electric wheelchair hockey or electric wheelchair floorball in various parts of the world.

== History of power hockey ==
In the 1970s, some public schools began providing sports lessons for pupils with disabilities. The majority of the children had physical disabilities that greatly hindered their movement (muscular dystrophy, cerebral palsy) and were not capable of participating in mainstream sports. This type of sport was well suited for adaptation because it could be played by solely utilizing the maneuverability of the wheelchair, and not focus on gross motor movement and muscle power.

There are similarities with floorball. Power Hockey is also referred to as "electric wheelchair hockey", and the name has some history behind it. With its great similarity to ice hockey, it was initially just called "wheelchair hockey", but later, in order to indicate the use of an electric wheelchair, the word "electric" was added.

Power hockey (electric wheelchair hockey) began to receive public interest in the late 1980s, when tournaments were established in Germany and the Netherlands. However, it wasn't until the 1990s that power hockey began to receive international attention. In 1998, the first ever World Games for power hockey were held in Utrecht, Netherlands. In 2001, a big international power hockey tournament took place in Minneapolis. In the following years, World Championships, European Championships, and more tournaments were formed in other European countries such as Belgium, Finland, and Italy.

== Positions ==
The number of players on a specific team can change, but at any given time there are five players on the floor. There is usually one head coach and one assistant coach to direct the movements of the team members.

- One center
- One goaltender
- Two winger positions (left and right)
- One defenseman position

== Rule changes ==
- A basketball court is used instead of ice.
- A plastic ball is used instead of a hockey puck.
- The hockey stick that is used is made entirely from plastic.
- Players with excessive limited range and movement can play with a T-stick.
- Due to the goalies' limited ability to move, they do not freeze the ball. Instead, the official blows the whistle to stop play when the ball is underneath the goaltender's wheelchair, and play restarts with a keeperball.
- "Each playoff game will consist of three fifteen-minute non-stop time periods. The last two minutes of the third period will be played on a stop-time basis" ("CEWHA Official Tournament Rules and Regulations"). If the score is tied at the end of the game, teams will play for additional five minutes, and whichever team that scores first will win ("CEWHA Official Tournament Rules and Regulations").

== Equipment ==
- "All players must use a power wheelchair. Manual wheelchairs and electric scooters are not permitted" ("CEWHA Official Tournament Rules and Regulations").
- All players are required to wear their team sweaters that are distinct from the other teams' at all times ("CEWHA Official Tournament Rules and Regulations").
- All players need to be fully equipped with protective eyewear and a seat belt ("CEWHA Official Tournament Rules and Regulations").

== World Cup ==
Year	Date	Host	Result				
Year	Date	Host	World champion	2. Place	3. Place	4. Place	Top scorer
2004	11–13 June	Helsinki (Finland)	Netherlands	Germany	Italy	Australia	Germany Paul Emmering (11 Goals); Netherlands April Ranshuysen (11 Goals); Belgium Lars Reniers (11 Goals)
2010	1–8 November	Lignano Sabbiadoro (Italy)	Germany	Netherlands	Finland	Italy	Belgium Bjorn Sarrazijn (44 Goals)
2014	6–10 August	Munich (Germany)	Netherlands	Belgium	Finland	Denmark	Belgium Björn Sarrazijn (20 Goals)
2018	24 September – 1 October	Lignano Sabbiadoro (Italy)	Italy	Denmark	Netherlands	Germany	Netherlands Dennis van der Boomen (20 Goals)
2022	9–14 August	Sursee (Switzerland)	Denmark	Netherlands	Switzerland	Finland	Denmark Anders Berenth (32 Goals)
2026	24 May – 1 June	Nastola (Finland)	Switzerland	Netherlands	Italy	Germany	Switzerland Jan Schäublin (56 Goals)

== North America Powerhockey Cup ==
Year	Host	Champion	Runner-Up	Top Scorer
2025	Philadelphia	Philadelphia Flyers Powerplay	Michigan Mustangs	Jake Saxton (Philadelphia Flyers Powerplay) (20)
2018	Plymouth, Michigan	Philadelphia Flyers Powerplay	Michigan Mustangs	Jake Saxton (Philadelphia Flyers Powerplay) (26) Alex Pitts (Philadelphia Flyers Powerplay) (26)
2016	Philadelphia	Minnesota Saints	Philadelphia Flyers Powerplay	Kevin Konfara (Michigan Mustangs) (32)
2014	Saint Paul, Minnesota	Minnesota Saints	Philadelphia Flyers Powerplay	Chad Wilson (Minnesota Saints) (24)
2012	Ottawa	Minnesota Saints	Michigan Mustangs	Chad Wilson (Minnesota Saints)
2010	Toronto	Minnesota Saints	Michigan Mustangs	Chad Wilson (Minnesota Saints)
2008	Minneapolis	Calgary Selects	Minnesota Stars	Chad Wilson (Minnesota Saints)

== See also ==
- Wheelchair Sports, USA
- Sledge hockey
