= Kerala School Kalolsavam 2025 =

Multi-arts festival in Kerala, India

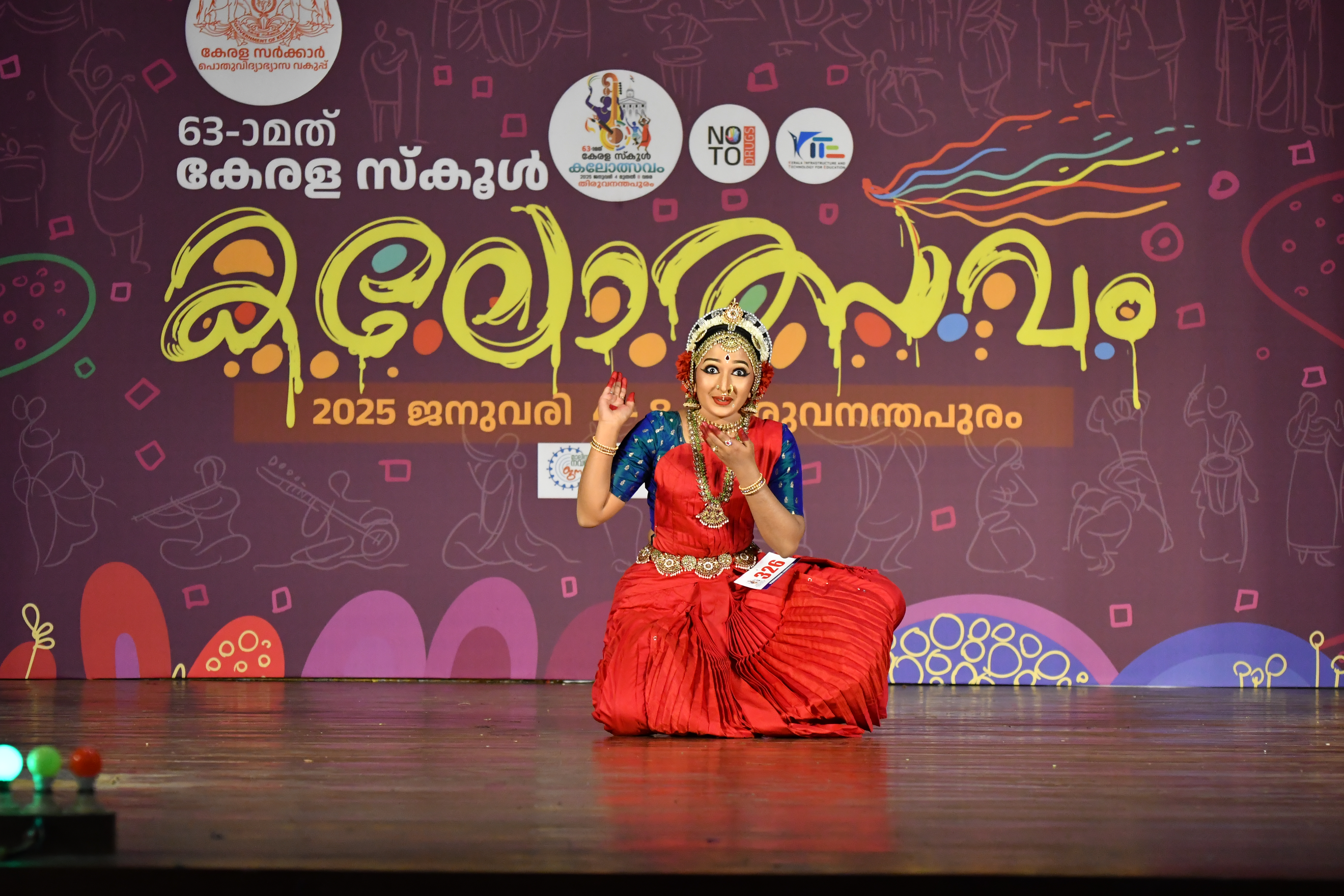
- Status: Concluded
- Genre: School arts festival, culture of Kerala, tribal art, School Kalolsavam
- Begins: 4 January 2025
- Ends: 8 January 2025
- Frequency: Annual
- Venue: Ananthapuri
- Locations: Thiruvananthapuram, Kerala
- Country: India
- Years active: 1957 – present
- Inaugurated: 26 January 1957
- Founder: C.S. Venkiteswaran
- Next event: 64th Kerala School Kalolsavam
- Participants: 15,000
- Organiser: Government of Kerala
- Website: Official website

The Kerala School Kalolsavam 2025 (Malayalam: കേരള സ്കൂൾ കലോത്സവം 2025), also referred to as the Kerala State School Arts Festival 2025, was the 63rd edition of the Kerala School Kalolsavam. It took place from 4 to 8 January in Thiruvananthapuram, the state capital. The festival was inaugurated by Kerala Chief Minister Pinarayi Vijayan at Central Stadium. Over 15,000 participants competed in 250 events held across 25 venues.

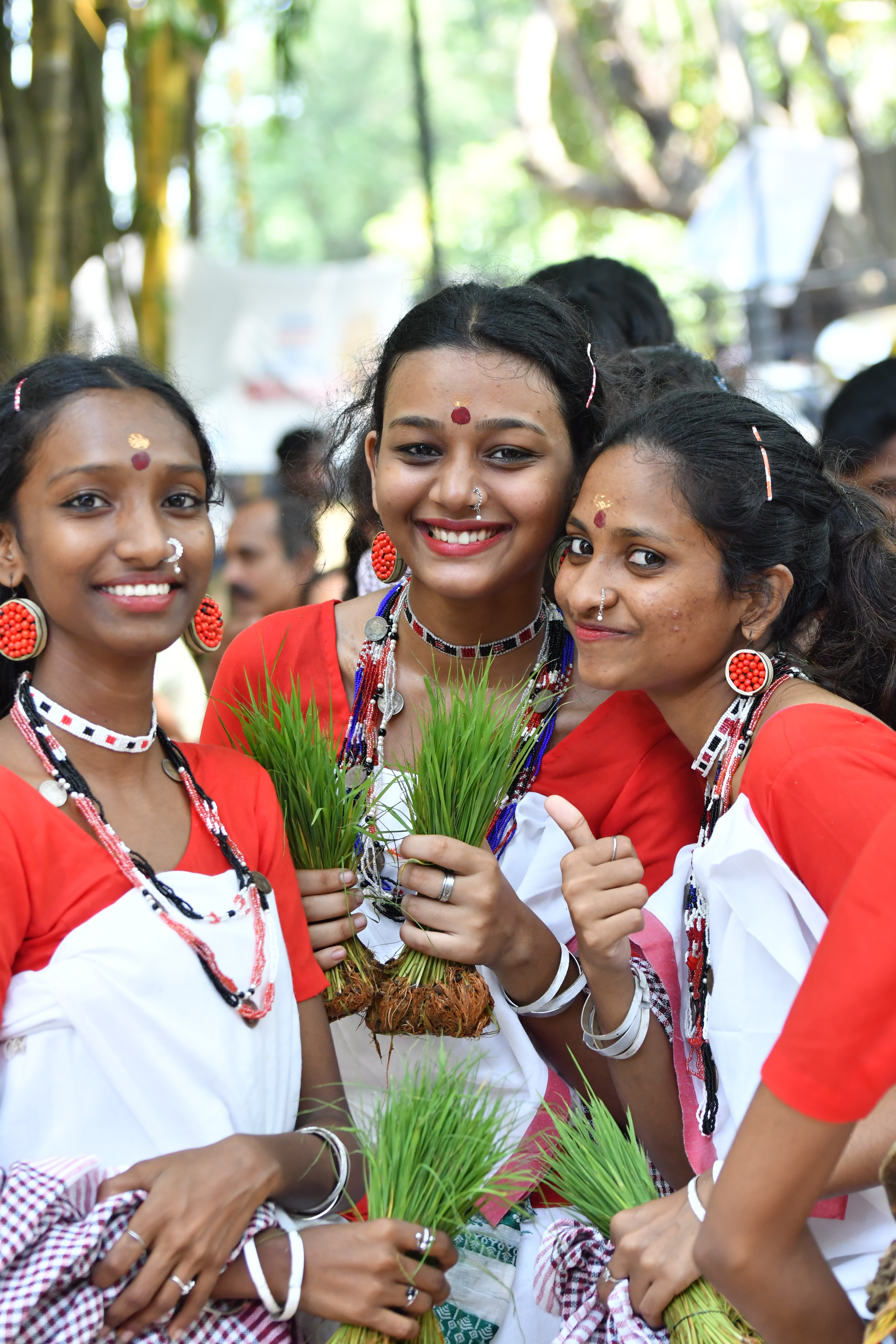
Dancers of tribal dance of Kerala in traditional costumes at Kerala School Kalolsavam 2025

During the closing ceremony at the Central Stadium, V. Sivankutty, the Minister for General Education and Labour of Kerala, presented the golden trophy to the winning district. The ceremony was attended by Malayalam film actors Asif Ali and Tovino Thomas, along with other prominent politicians from Kerala.

At the conclusion of the five-day event on 8 January 2025, Thrissur district won the championship for the 6th time in the 63-year history of the Kalolsavam. This victory comes 25 years after their last win in 1999. Thrissur secured 1008 points, with Palakkad as the first runner-up with 1007 points, and Kannur as the second runner-up with 1003 points.

The 63rd Kerala State School Arts Festival in 2025 is the first arts festival to include tribal arts. This year's festival gave special importance to the rich artistic traditions of tribal communities, incorporating their art forms into the main events. This initiative marks a significant step in preserving and promoting the cultural heritage of Kerala's tribal communities. The inclusion of tribal arts celebrates cultural diversity and provides a prominent platform for tribal artists to showcase their unique traditions. This effort has been widely appreciated as a milestone in recognizing and honoring the cultural contributions of tribal communities in Kerala.

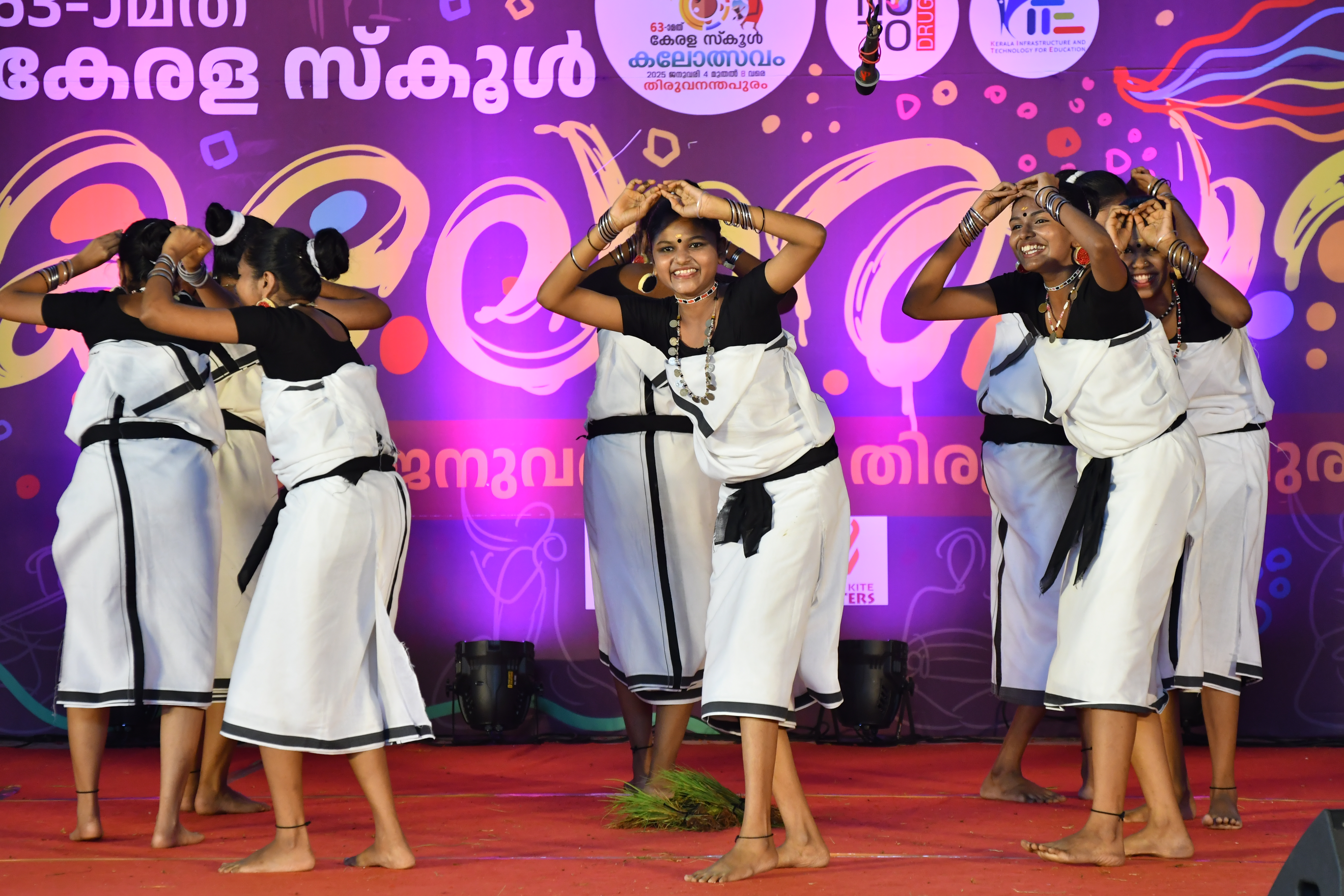
Tribal dance

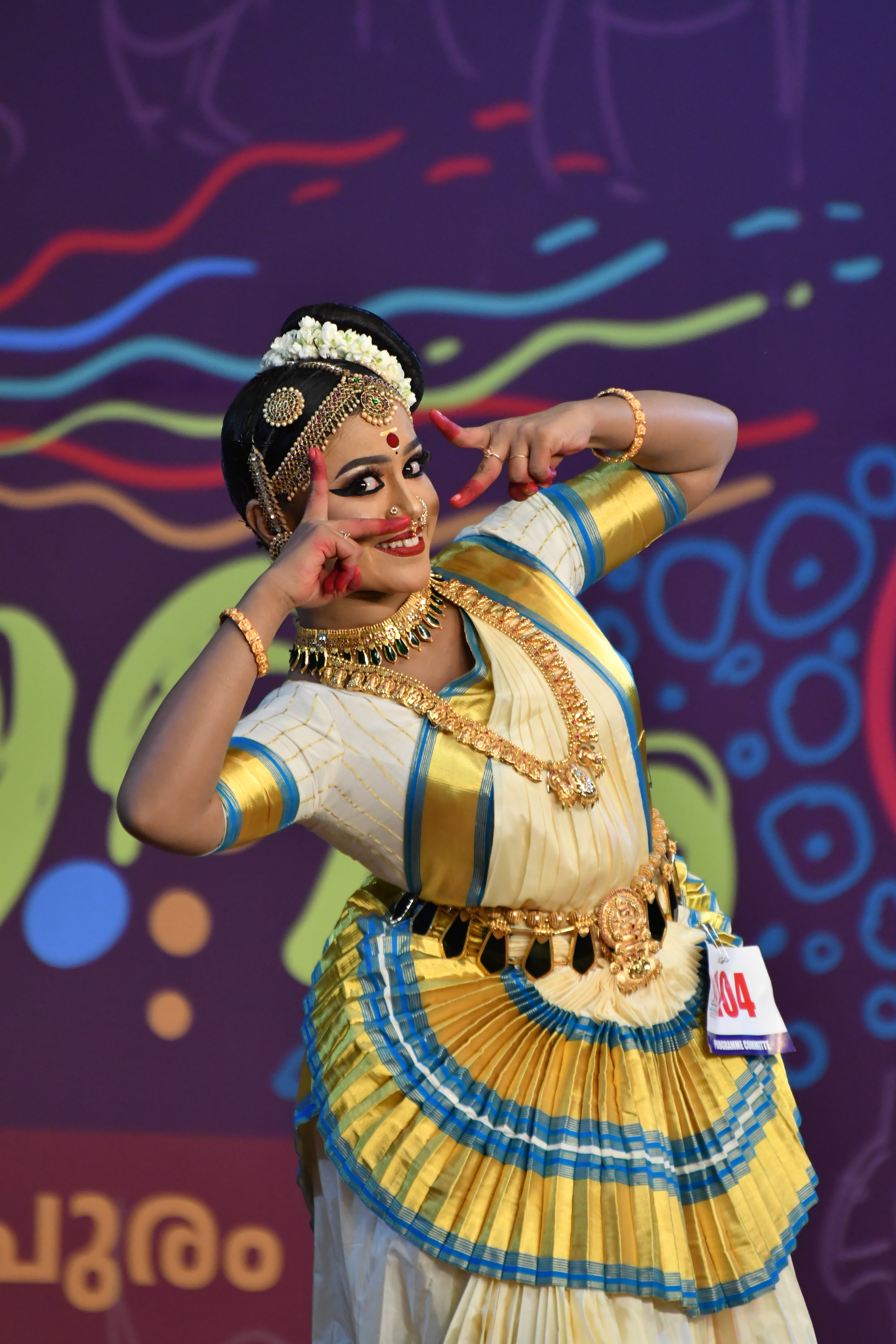
Mohiniyattam

== Background ==
Kerala School Kalolsavam, considered one of the largest school arts festivals in Asia, organised by the Government of Kerala in association with the Department of General Education, was originally scheduled to take place from December 3 to 7 for its 63rd edition. However, the Government of Kerala postponed the event to avoid a conflict with the National Achievement Survey examination. The festival was then held in Ananthapuri, Thiruvananthapuram district, featuring 25 venues for 250 events.

For the first time in the festival's history, five tribal art forms are included in the competition. These are Mangalamkali, a traditional dance of the Mavilan and Malavettuvan communities from Kasaragod and Kannur districts; Paniya Nritham, a dance of the Paniya community in Wayanad district; Malapulayattam, an art form of the Malapulaya community in Idukki district; Irula Nritham, a dance of the Irula community from Attappady in Palakkad district; and Paliya Nritham, an art form of the Paliya community in Idukki district.

=== Opening ceremony ===
The event began with the flag hoisting by the director of general education at the Central Stadium, which served as the main venue for the festival. The official inauguration took place at MT Nila in the Central Stadium. The ceremony was led by the minister of general education, V. Sivankutty, with principal secretary of general education, Rani George, in attendance. Several other officials, including Ministers G. R. Anil, K. Rajan, A. K. Saseendran, Roshy Augustine, K. N. Balagopal, and other notable guests, were also present.

The event included a special welcome song for the Kalamotsavam, composed by Sreenivasan Thuneri and arranged by Kavalam Sreekumar. The performance featured children from Kerala Kalamandalam and public schools. A group dance by students from Wayanad Vellarimala GHSS was also part of the opening ceremony.

=== Venues ===
The Kerala School Kalolsavam 2025 was held at 25 locations in the Thiruvananthapuram district. Each venue is named after one of Kerala's major rivers. The list of venues and their corresponding names is as follows:

Stage name	Venue	City/town
Bharathappuzha	Central Stadium	Palayam
Periyar	Government College for Women	Vazhuthacaud
Pambayar	Tagore Theatre	Vazhuthacaud
Achankovil	Karthika Thirunal Theatre	East Fort
Karamanayar	Government Higher Secondary School	Manacaud
Bhavani Nadhi	St. Joseph's Higher Secondary School	Palayam
Vamanapuram Nadhi	Government Model Girls Higher Secondary School	Pattom
Pallikkalar	Nirmala Bhavan Higher Secondary School	Kowdiar
Kalladayar	Government Higher Secondary School for Girls, Cotton Hill	Cotton Hill
Manimalayar	Swathi Thirunal College of Music	Swathi Thirunal
Meenachalar	The Institution of Engineers	Vellayambalam
Muvattupuzhayar	Samskarika Kendram	Poojappura
Chalakudy Puzha	Carmel Higher Secondary School	Vazhuthacaud
Karuvannur Puzha	Bharat Bhavan	Thycaud
Kabini Nadhi	Nishagandhi Auditorium	Nanthancodu
Chaliyar	Sisu Kshema Samithi Hall	Thycaud
Kadalundi Puzha	Government Model Boys Higher Secondary School	Thycaud
Kuttiady Puzha	Government Model LPS	Thycaud
Mayyazhipuzha	Mahatma Ayyankali Hall	Palayam
Thalassery Puzha	Government Higher Secondary School	Chala
Valapattanam Puzha	Government Model Boys Higher Secondary School (Classroom 1)	Thycaud
Ramapuram Puzha	Government Model Boys Higher Secondary School (Classroom 2)	Thycaud
Peruvemba Puzha	Government Model Boys Higher Secondary School (Classroom 3)	Thycaud
Kallayi Puzha	Government Model Boys Higher Secondary School (Classroom 4)	Thycaud
Chittari Puzha	St. Mary's Higher Secondary School	Pattom

=== Closing ceremony ===
The closing ceremony of the event took place on January 8, 2025, at the Central Stadium in Thiruvananthapuram. Malayalam film actors Asif Ali and Tovino Thomas were the chief guests. Several politicians from Kerala attended, including Finance Minister K. N. Balagopal, Minister G. R. Anil, Speaker A. N. Shamseer, and other ministers: K. Krishnankutty, Kadannappalli Ramachandran, P. A. Mohammed Riyas, P. Prasad, O. R. Kelu, and Dr. R. Bindu. Members of the Kerala Legislative Assembly and V. D. Satheesan Leader of the Opposition in the Kerala Assembly, including A. A. Rahim, along with chairpersons of various Kalolsavam committees, such as Antony Raju, K. Ansalan, C. K. Hareendran, V. Joy, V. K. Prasanth, O. S. Ambika, Chief Secretary Sarada Muraleedharan, Principal Secretary of the General Education Department Rani George, Director S. Shanavas, and Additional Director R. S. Shibu, were also present.

Chirayinkeezhu Sreekandan Nair, the designer of the golden cup, was presented with a gold medal at the ceremony. Pazhayidom Mohanan Namboothiri, marking 25 years in the culinary field, and Haritha Karmasena, recognized for their contributions to the smooth operation of the festival's pandal, light, and sound systems, were also honored. 78 awards were distributed across various categories. Additionally, media awards for the 62nd State School Kalolasavam and the 2024 Kerala School Sports Meet held in Kochi were presented.

== Performance table ==
The table below provides an overview of the performance of each of the 14 districts, showing the final points earned each day from January 4 to 8. The time at which the data was collected is also indicated (in brackets) for each day.

No. of days District(s)	Day 1 (7.00 PM IST)	Day 2 (11.00 PM IST)	Day 3 (10.30 PM IST)	Day 4 (12.00 PM IST)	Day 5 (4.15 PM IST)	Final result
No. of days District(s)	4 January	5 January	6 January	7 January	8 January	
Alappuzha	58	415	670	909	953	8th place
Ernakulam	63	413	671	930	980	5th place
Idukki	57	340	570	778	817	13th place
Kannur	66	439	713	961	1003	2nd RUNNER-UP
Kasaragod	57	386	642	876	913	10th place
Kollam	66	411	672	921	964	6th place
Kottayam	58	387	639	881	924	9th place
Kozhikode	68	436	708	959	1000	4th place
Malappuram	64	417	681	934	980	5th place
Palakkad	64	430	702	961	1007	1st runner-up
Pathanamthitta	55	361	596	807	848	12th place
Thiruvananthapuram	56	409	666	913	957	7th place
Thrissur	66	438	708	960	1008	Winner
Wayanad	52	382	637	865	895	11th place
In the table above, the blue numbers represent the lowest points and the red numbers represent the highest points.; W – winner; 1RU – 1st runner-up; 2RU – 2nd runner-up; — host district

=== Category-wise performance ===
The following is a list of winners by school and district in each of the four categories at the 2025 Kalolsavam. For multiple winners listed, it indicates they had the same number of points. BSS Gurukulam Higher Secondary School from Palakkad won the overall school championship with 171 points. Carmel Higher Secondary School from Thiruvananthapuram placed as the first runner-up with 116 points, and MGM Higher Secondary School from Wayanad took the second runner-up position with 106 points.

Category
Category	1st place		2nd place		3rd place	
Category	School(s)	District(s)	School(s)	District(s)	School(s)	District(s)
High School General	MGM Higher Secondary School, Mananthavady	Palakkad, Thrissur	BSS Gurukulam Higher Secondary School, Alathur	Kollam, Kozhikode	Durga Higher Secondary School, Kanhangad	Kannur
Higher Secondary School General	Nair Samajam Higher Secondary School, Mannar	Thrissur	BSS Gurukulam Higher Secondary School, Alathur	Palakkad	Carmel Girls Higher Secondary School, Vazhuthacaud	Kannur
High School Arabic	Government Higher Secondary School, Kallar	Ernakulam, Kannur, Kozhikode	Hayathudeen High School, Erattupetta	Kasaragod, Malappuram, Wayanad	Muslim Girls Higher Secondary School, Erattupetta	Kollam, Thrissur
High School Sanskrit	Amrita Sanskrit Higher Secondary School, Parippally	Malappuram, Palakkad, Kasaragod	Mannam Memorial High School, Nariampara	Kannur, Kollam, Kozhikode	TD Higher Secondary School, Thuravoor	Thrissur

== Gallery ==
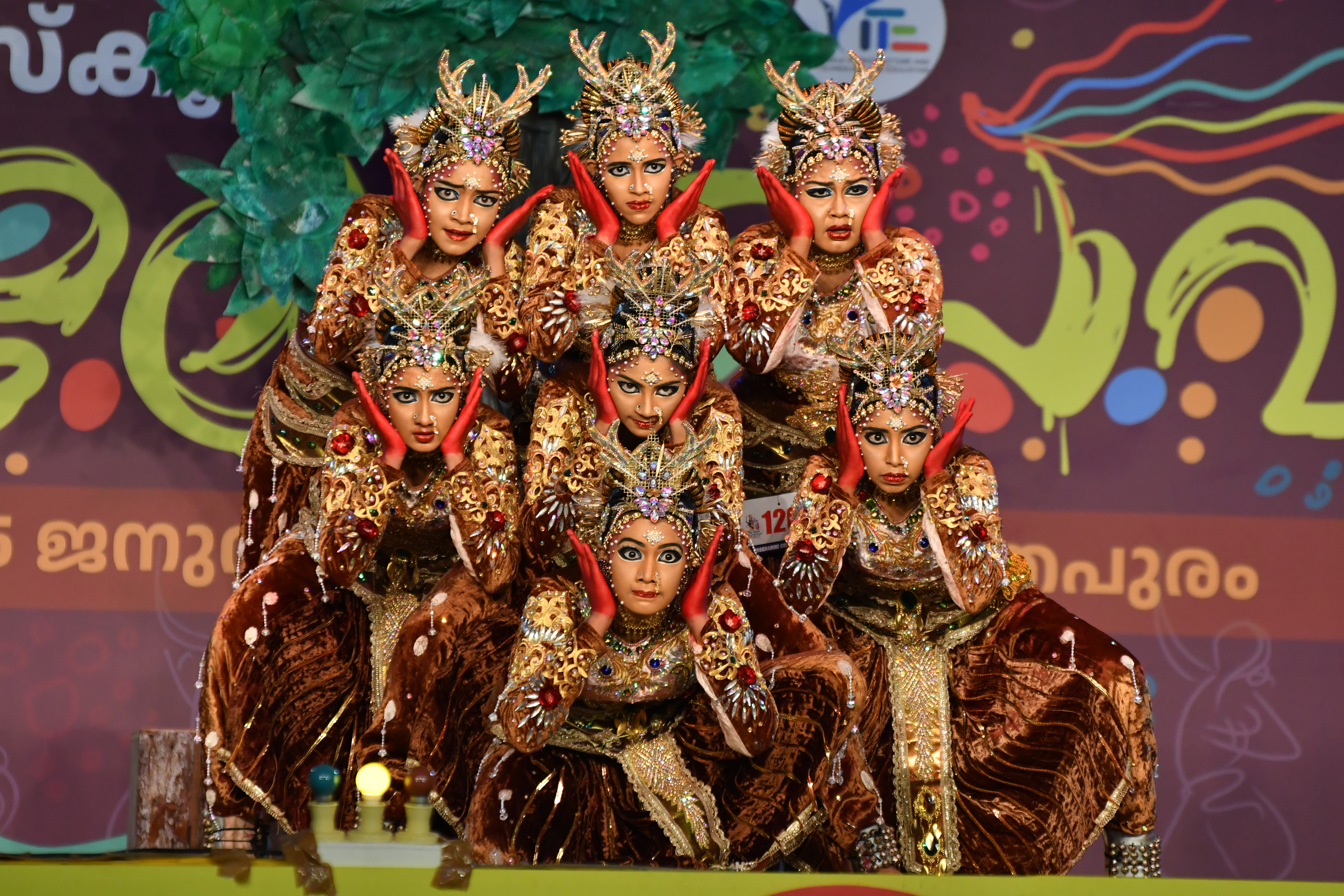
Folk dance (group)

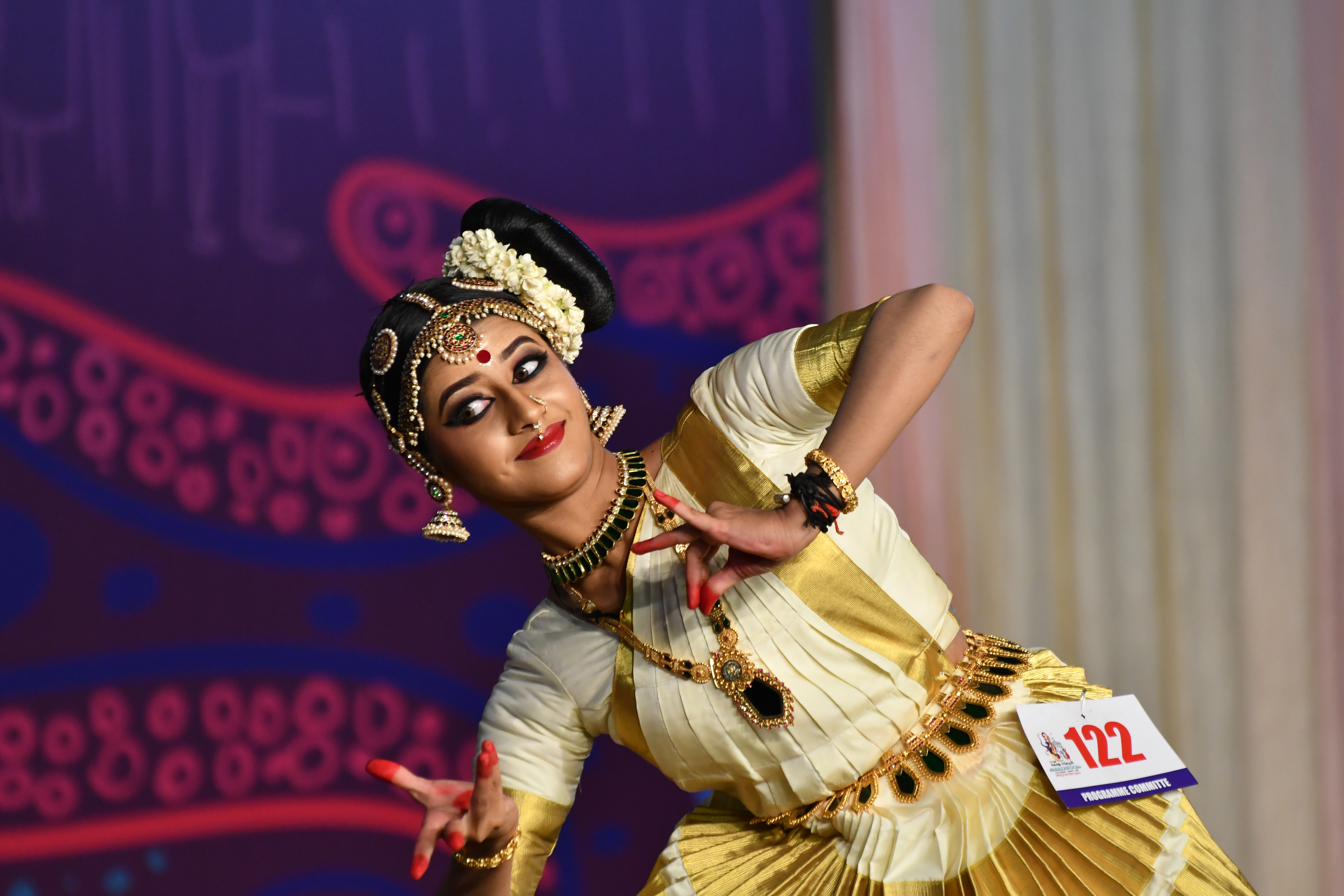
Mohiniyattam

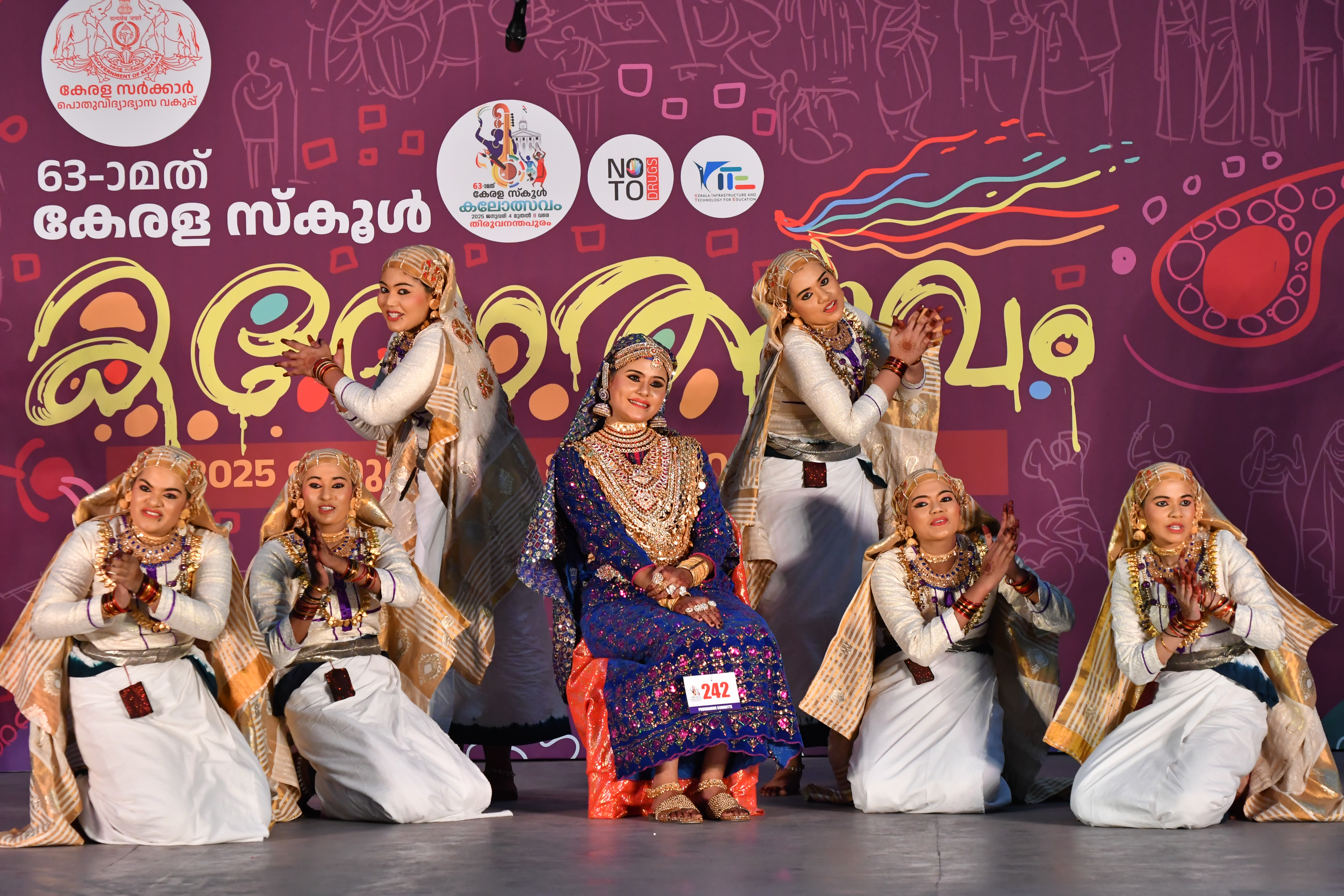
Oppana

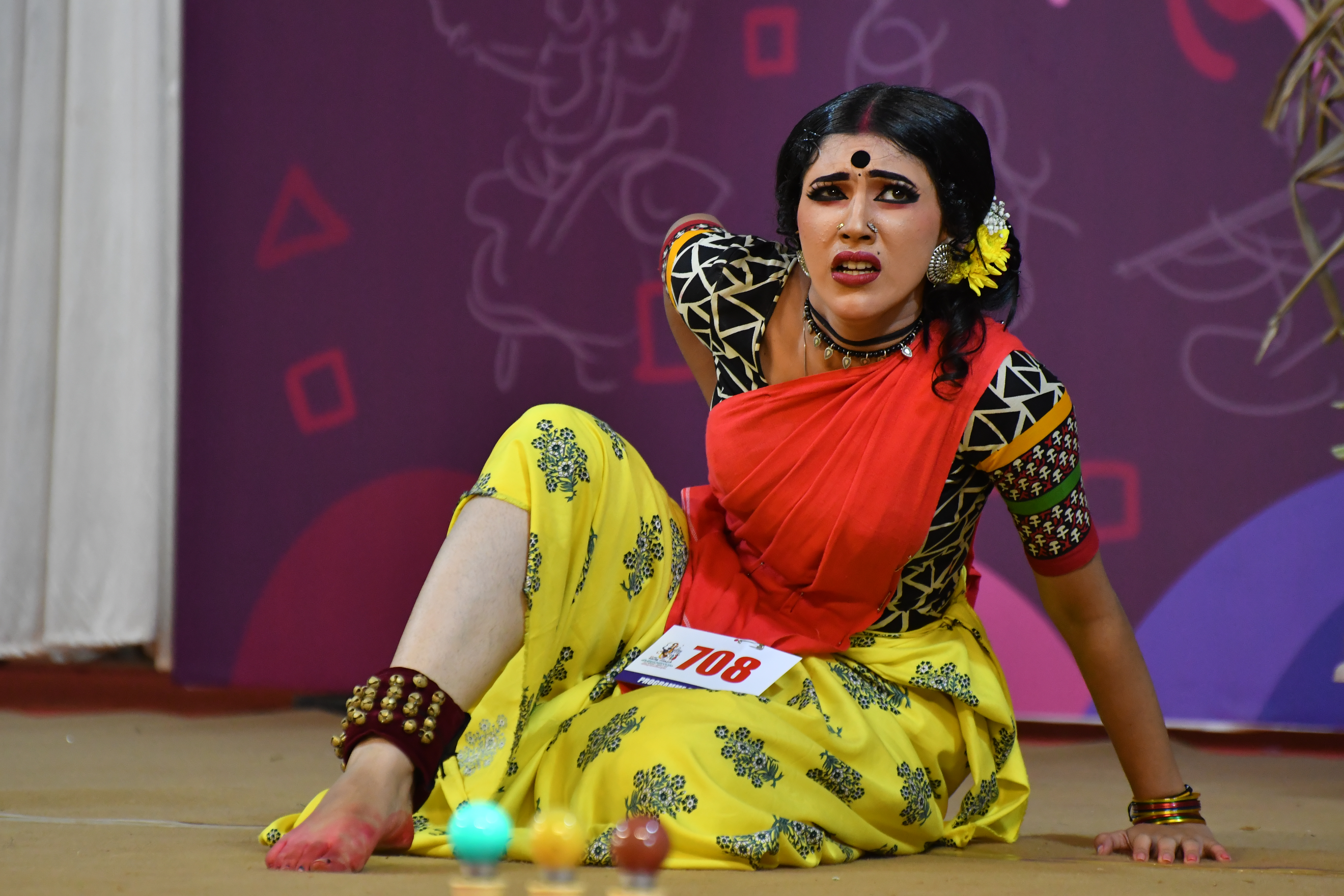
Folk dance(Solo)

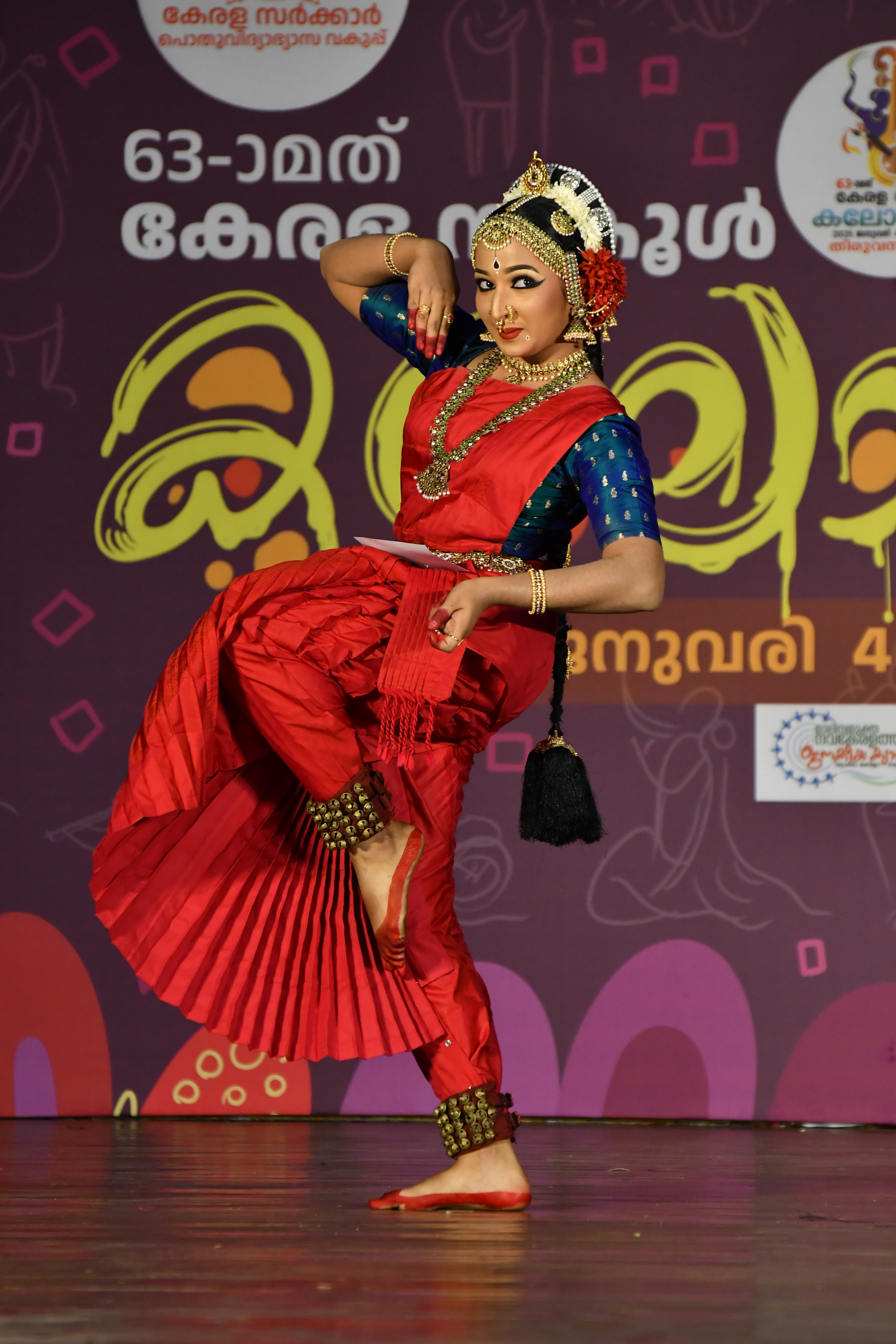
Kuchipudi

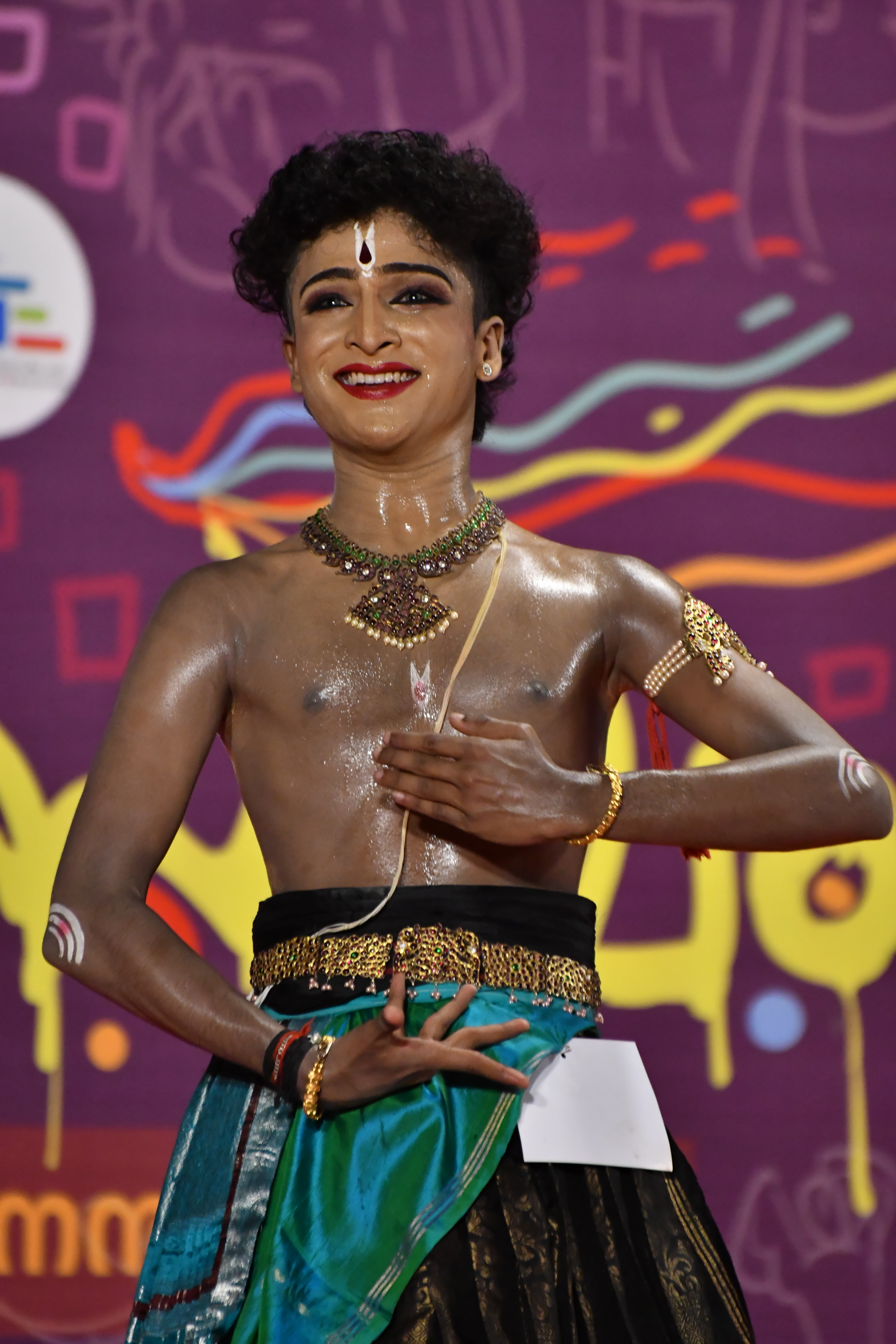
Bharathanatyam

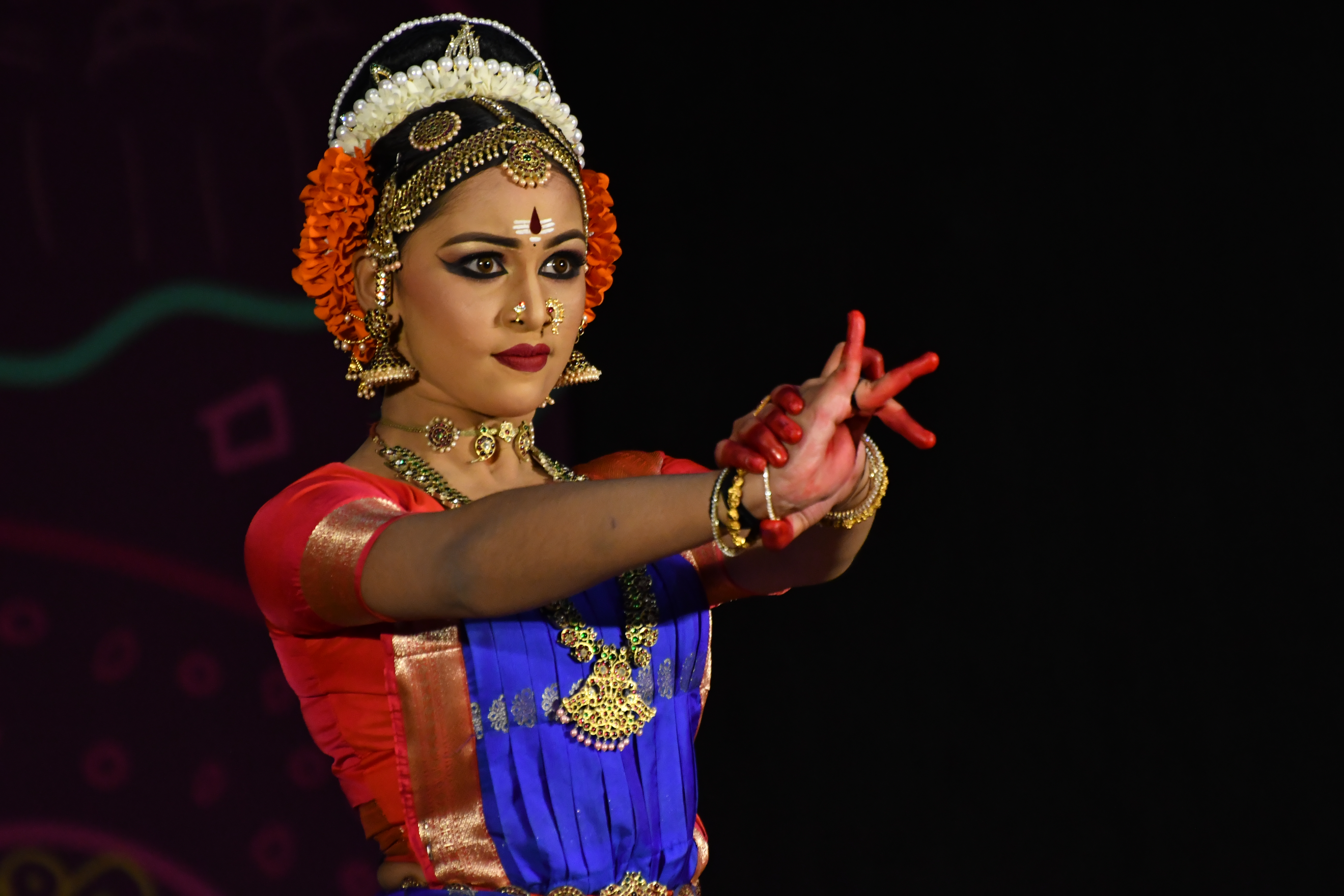
Bharathanatyam

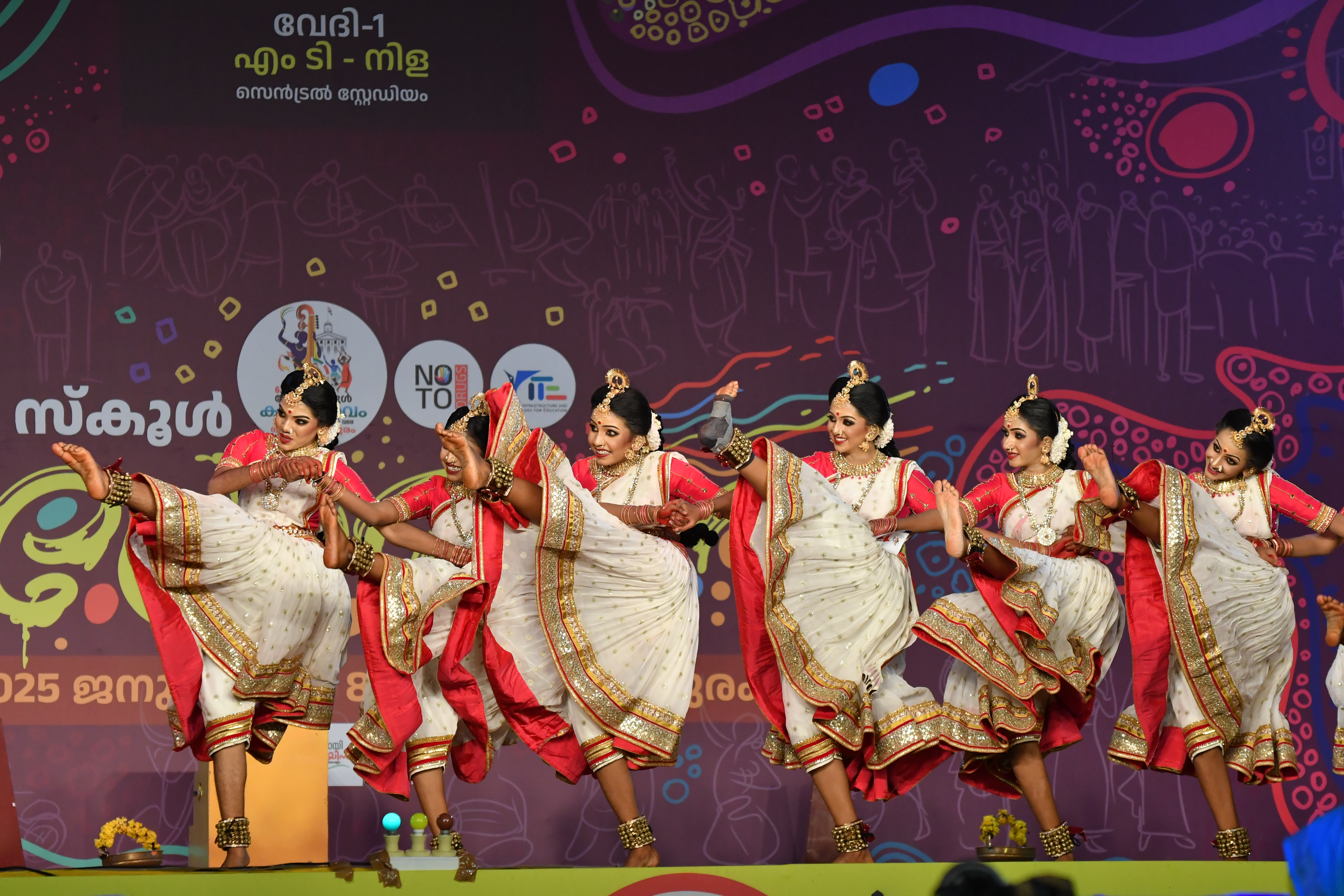
Folk dance (group)

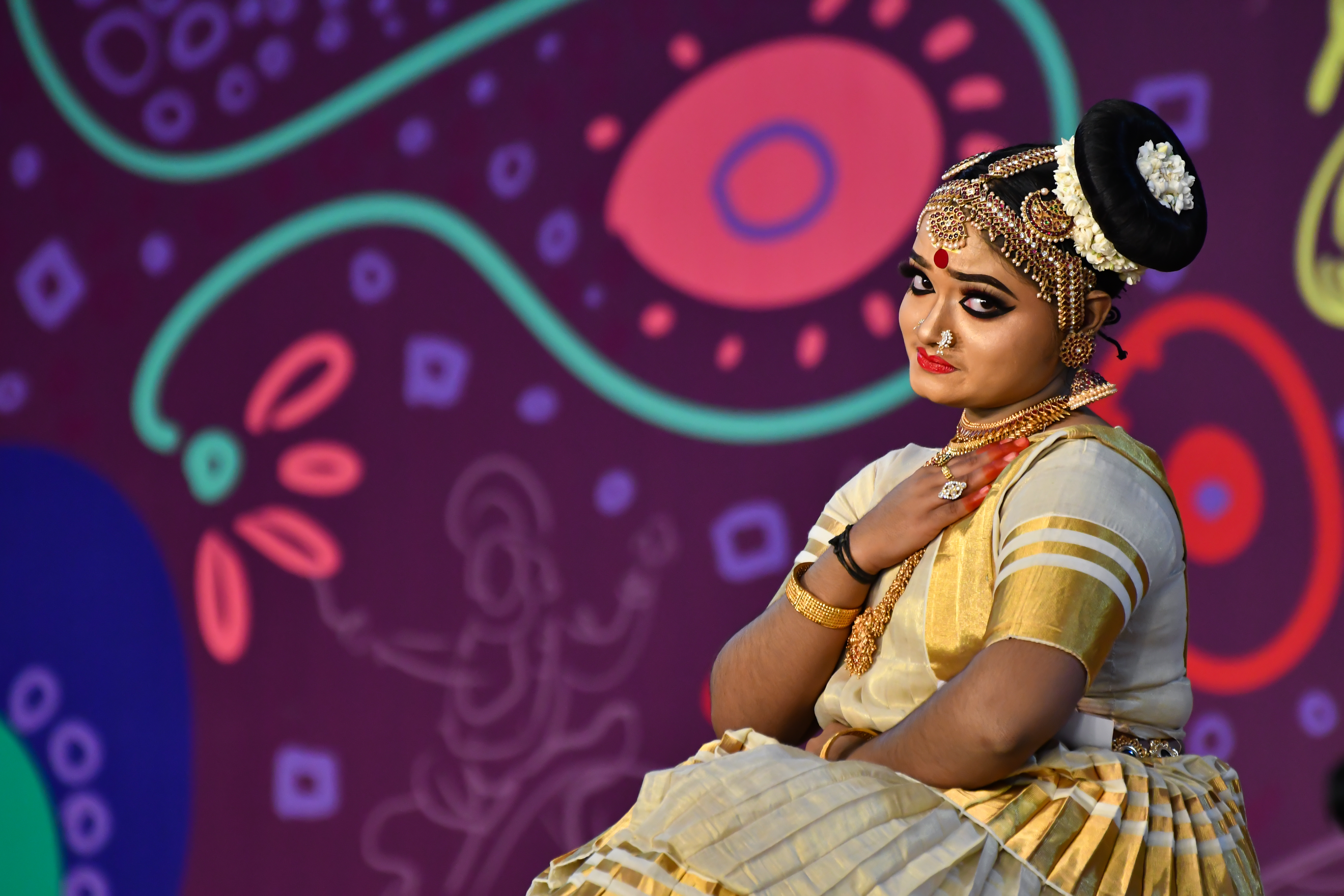
Mohiniyattam
