= BSS Gurukulam Higher Secondary School =

Location
- Kindimukku, Alathur; India; 10.6483°N 76.5565°E

Information
- Type: Govt. Un-Aided Management
- Motto: Ya Vidhya Sa Vimukthaya; An old lamp with new flame Quality is the motto
- Established: 1971
- Founder: Swami Nirmalanda Yogi
- School district: Palakkad
- Principal: Vijayan V. Anand
- Grades: LKG to +2
- Enrollment: 1700+
- Colors: Red, Blue, Green, Yellow
- Athletics: Athletics, Volleyball, Basketball, Kabaddi, Football, Kho kho
- Affiliation: Department of General Education (SCERT, DHSE)
- Website: bssgurukulam.com

Brahmananda Swami Sivayogi Gurukulam Higher Secondary School is an ISO 9001:2008 certified smart school. It is situated in Alathur in Palakkad district of Kerala state in India. It is 20 kilometers away from Palakkad on the side of NH-544. The school offers education from LKG to +2 grades.

== Overview ==
The school was established in 1971 by Swami Nirmalanda Yogi, who is a disciple of Brahmananda Swami Sivayogi. It is a recognized unaided institution. It's also a residential and co-educational school with English medium parallel divisions in all standards. It is conducted by 'BSS Educational Society', Alathur, Kerala. The school provides teaching facilities from LKG to XII. The syllabus followed here is the same as in other state recognized schools in Kerala. The school is an ISO certified and British Council accredited institution.

== Admission ==
Admissions and withdrawals are made strictly in accordance with Kerala educational rules. But the number of admission is limited to each class with reference to the accommodation. The admission to school is carried out through merit and management quota for all streams. The school management can also allot admission to certain number of students in each stream, under management quota, apart from merit quota.

== Performances in Arts and Science ==
The school gives predominant consideration in the field of arts. For the last nine years the school tops in the state school arts fest. The school topped in High school section in the 52nd Kerala School Kalolsavam which was held at Thrissur, in the 53rd KSK held at Malappuram and in the 56th KSK held at Thiruvananthapuram. The school was listed at 4th position on HSS section in 52nd KSK and 3rd in 53rd KSK. It was first time in the history of Palakkad that a school from the district acquired such reputed rankings. The school secured the highest points in the 60th KSK 2019 held in Kanhangad and in KSK 2023 held at Kozhikode by securing 156 points. In the Kerala School Kalolsavam 2025, BSS Gurukulam topped in the school category with 171 points.

BSS Gurukulam won the overall championship for the best school at the Kerala State School Science Festival 2019.
