= 64th Kerala School Kalolsavam =

Multi-arts festival in Kerala, India

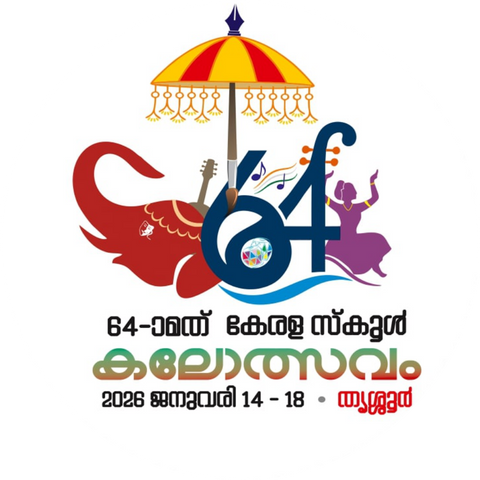
- Logo of the 64th Kerala School Kalolsavam
- Status: Concluded
- Genre: School arts festival, culture of Kerala, tribal art, School Kalolsavam
- Begins: 14 January 2026
- Ends: 18 January 2026
- Frequency: Annual
- Venue: Thrissur
- Locations: Thrissur, Kerala
- Country: India
- Years active: 1957–present
- Previous event: 63rd
- Participants: 14,000+
- Organiser: Government of Kerala
- Website: ulsavam.kite.kerala.gov.in

64th Kerala School Kalolsavam also referred to as the Kerala State School Arts Festival 2026, was the 64th edition of the Kerala School Kalolsavam. It was held from 14 to 18 January 2026 in Thrissur, Kerala. The festival featured competitions across 239 items at 25 venues, with the main venue at the Pooram Exhibition Ground in Thekkinkadu Maidan.

The festival was inaugurated by Chief Minister Pinarayi Vijayan. At the conclusion of the five-day event, Kannur district won the championship with 1,028 points, followed by host district Thrissur with 1,023 points and Kozhikode district with 1,017 points.

A notable development during the edition was the first remote participation in the festival's history, when a student from Kasaragod district was allowed to compete online on medical grounds and secured an A grade.

== Background ==
The 64th edition of the festival was scheduled to be held in Thrissur after the General Education Department announced the host city in July 2025. The event schedule was formally released in December 2025, fixing the festival from 14 to 18 January 2026 across 25 venues in the city.

The 2026 edition was organised under the theme Responsible Kalolsavam. Organisers framed the event around responsible consumption, responsible food habits and responsible competition, while also introducing green measures such as discouraging plastic use and regulating sound systems.

The festival continued the inclusion of tribal art forms introduced in the previous edition. Contemporary reporting noted stronger participation across all five tribal performance items in 2026, indicating wider adoption by schools across districts.

=== Opening ceremony ===
The festival was inaugurated on 14 January 2026 at the main venue in Thrissur by Chief Minister Pinarayi Vijayan. In his inaugural address, Vijayan described the festival as a space for artistic expression and social harmony, and called for art to be used against divisive tendencies in society.

=== Venues ===
The 64th Kerala School Kalolsavam was held at 25 venues in and around Thrissur. The venues were named after flowers, with the main venue at the Pooram Exhibition Ground in Thekkinkadu Maidan named Sooryakanthi.

=== Festival arrangements ===
A common dining facility was arranged at Palace Ground, while registration functioned at Government Model Boys HSS and the programme office at Government Model GVHSS. The festival kitchen, led by Pazhayidam Mohanan Namboothiri, was designed to serve thousands of participants daily, with the dining pavilion accommodating 4,000 people at a time.

=== Online participation ===
During the festival, Class X student Siya Fathima of Kasaragod district became the first participant in the history of the Kerala School Kalolsavam to compete remotely. She was granted special permission by the General Education Department after being diagnosed with vasculitis and placed under strict quarantine. Participating via video conference in Arabic poster designing, she secured an A grade.

=== Closing ceremony ===
The closing ceremony was held on 18 January 2026, with actor Mohanlal attending as chief guest. Kannur district won the overall championship with 1,028 points, narrowly ahead of host district Thrissur on 1,023 points; Kozhikode finished third with 1,017 points.

== Performance table ==
The table below provides an overview of the performance of each of the 14 districts, showing the final points earned.

Categories District(s)	HS General	HSS General	HS Arabic	HS Sanskrit	Gold Cup Point	Final results
Alappuzha	443	489	91	91	932	12th place
Ernakulam	464	514	95	95	978	7th place
Idukki	403	448	87	80	851	14th place
Kannur	494	534	95	95	1028	WINNER
Kasaragod	453	494	95	93	947	9th place
Kollam	471	517	95	95	988	5th place
Kottayam	467	475	91	91	942	10th place
Kozhikode	479	538	95	95	1017	2nd RUNNER-UP
Malappuram	468	513	93	95	981	6th place
Palakkad	474	539	95	95	1013	4th place
Pathanamthitta	433	462	64	95	895	13th place
Thiruvananthapuram	461	516	95	93	977	8th place
Thrissur	489	534	95	95	1023	1st RUNNER-UP
Wayanad	457	478	95	90	935	11th place
W – winner; 1RU – 1st runner-up; 2RU – 2nd runner-up; — host district

== Gallery ==
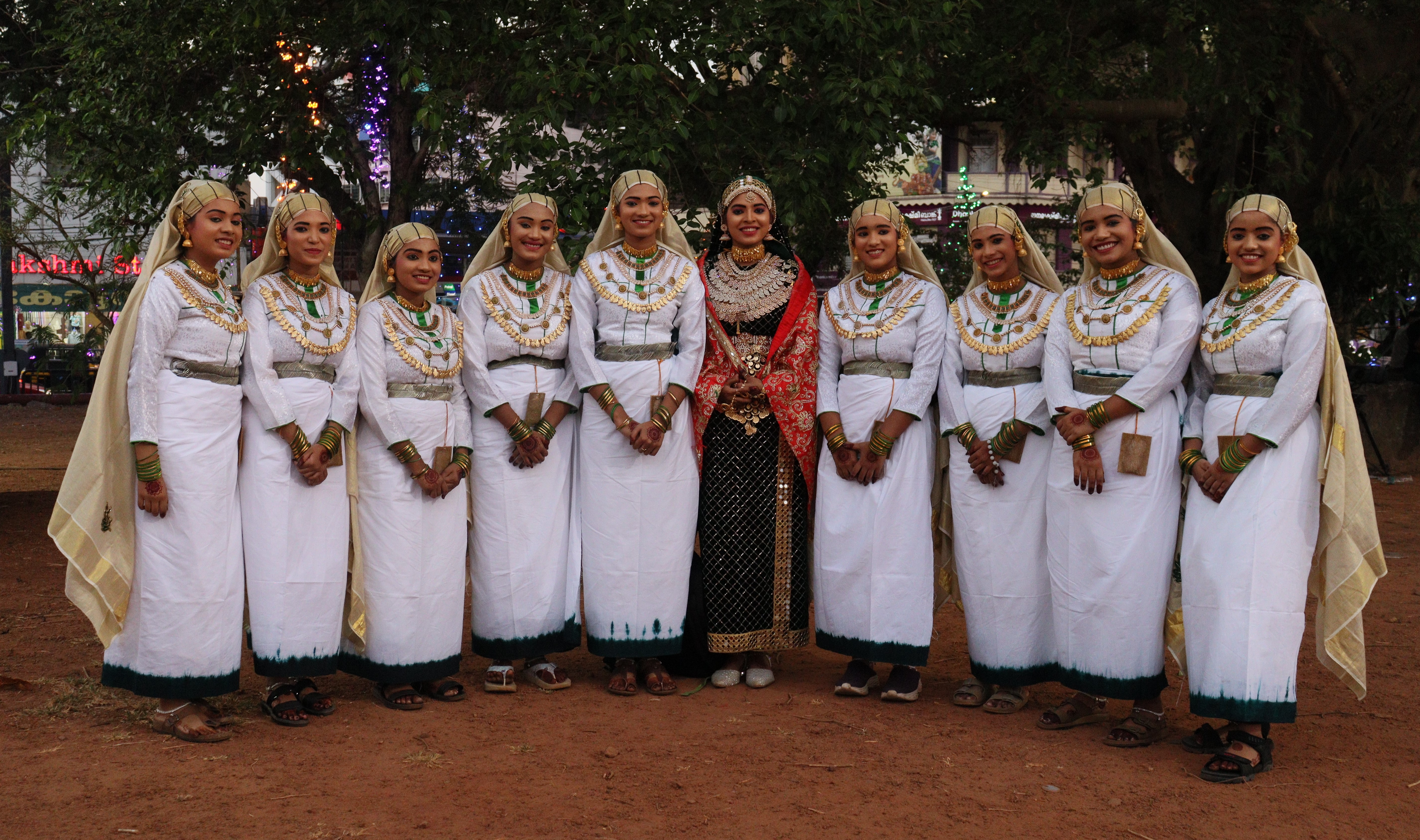

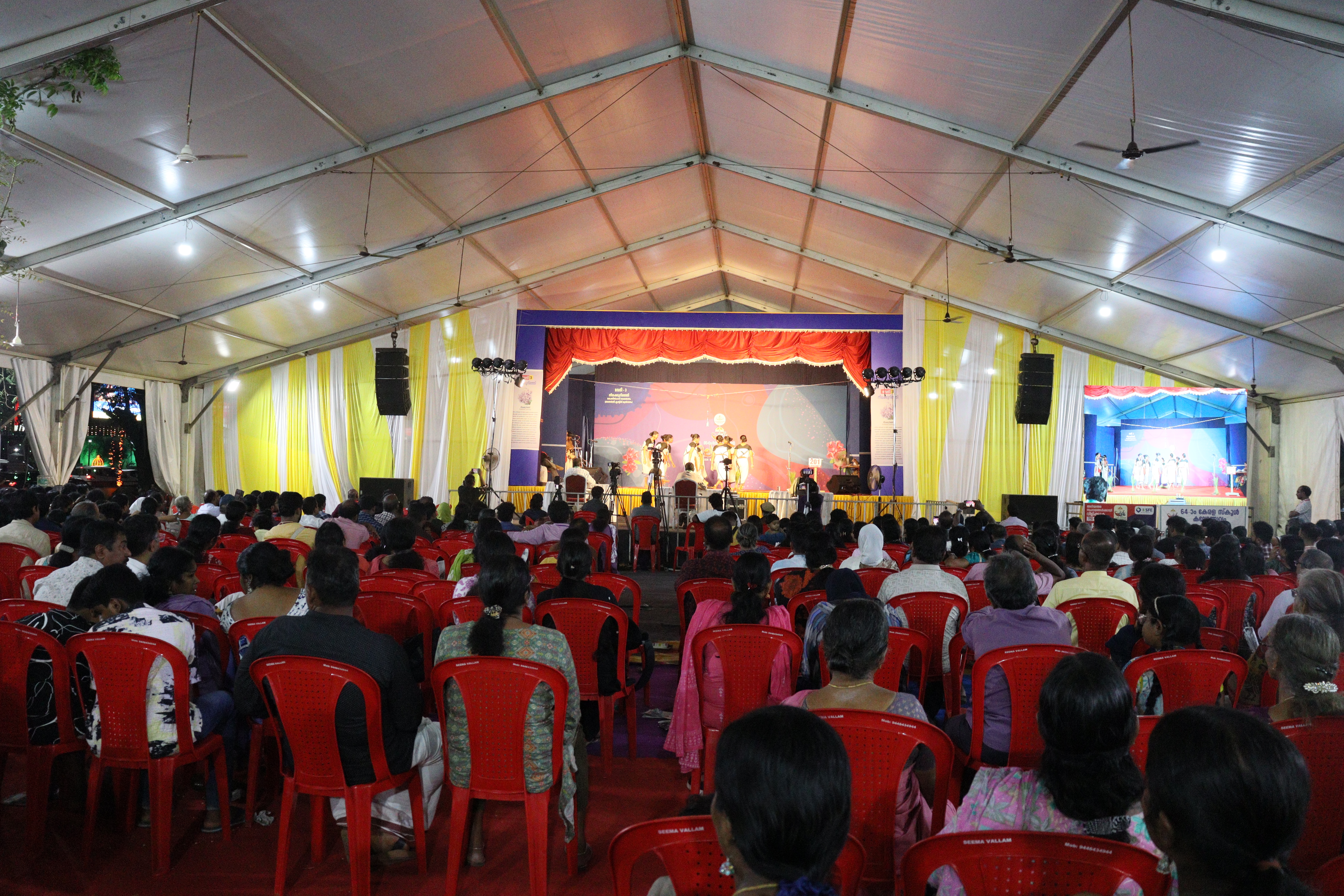

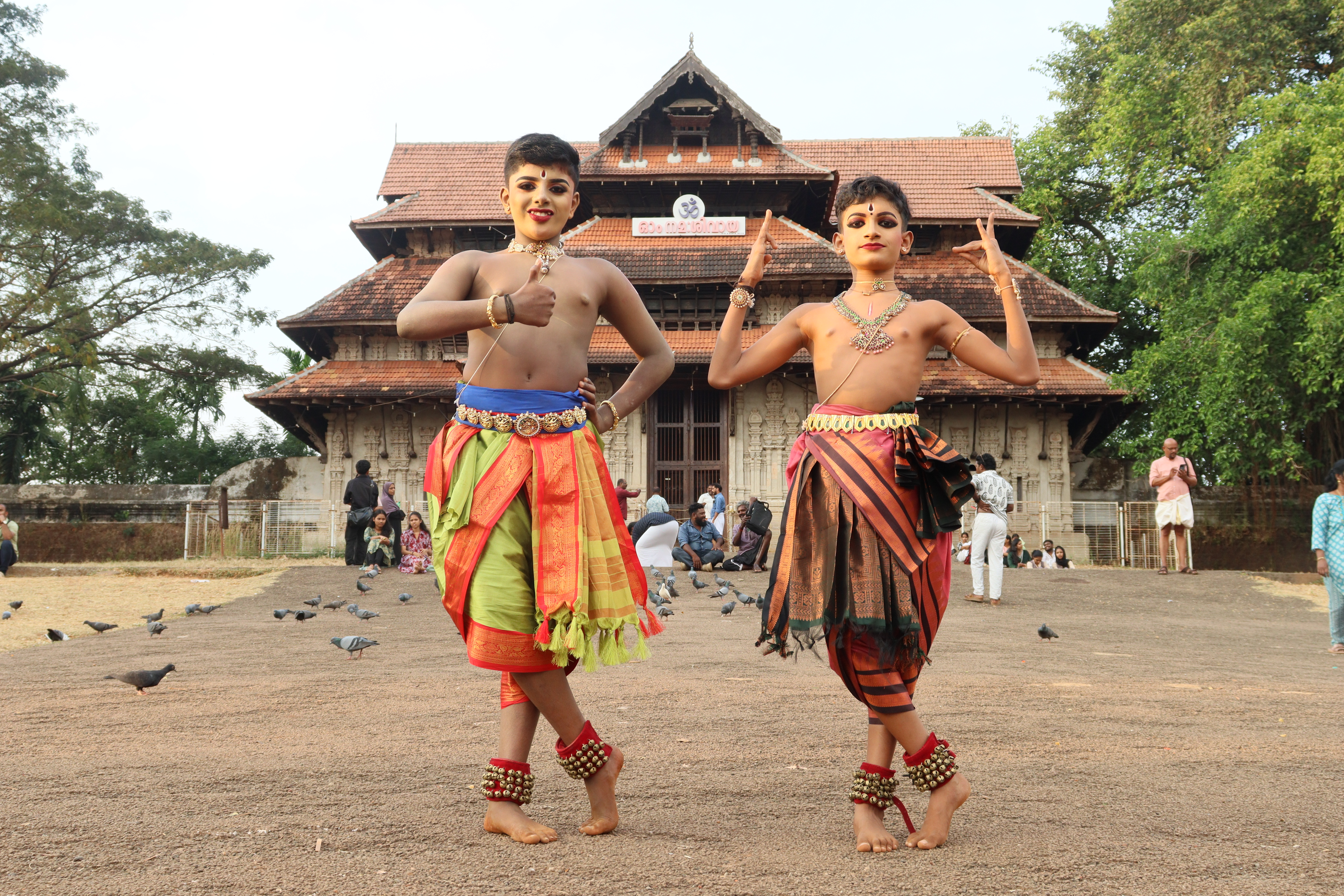

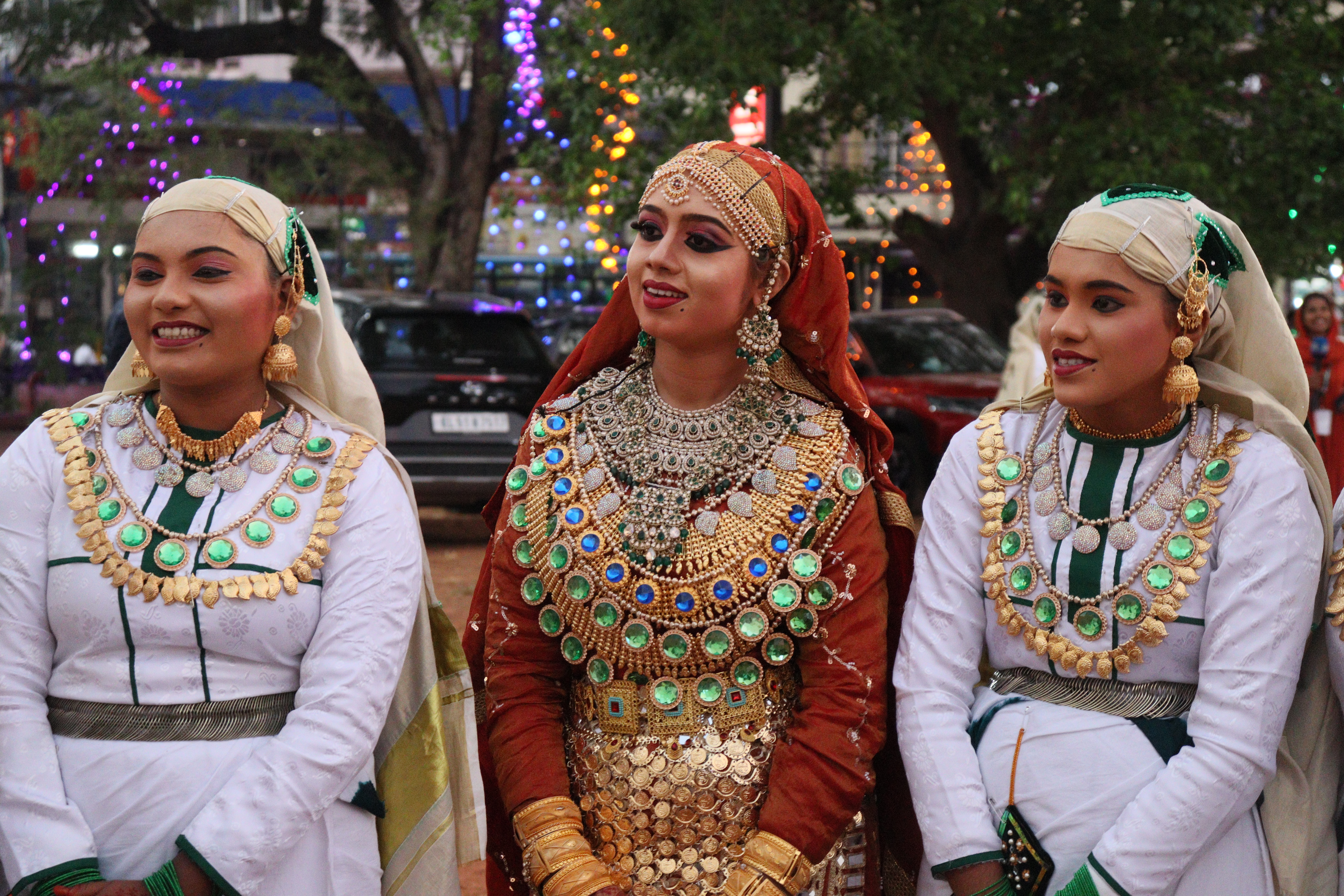
