= Vazhuthacaud =

- Neighborhood
- Location in Kerala, India
- Coordinates: 8°30′05″N 76°57′34″E
- Country: India
- State: Kerala
- District: Thiruvananthapuram

Languages
  - Official: Malayalam, English
- Time zone: UTC+5:30 (IST)
- PIN: 695 010, 695 014
- Telephone code: 0471
- Vehicle registration: KL-01
- Coastline: 0 kilometres (0 mi)
- Nearest city: East Fort, Thycaud, Vellayambalam
- Lok Sabha constituency: Thiruvananthapuram
- Climate: Tropical monsoon (Köppen)
- Avg. summer temperature: 35 °C (95 °F)
- Avg. winter temperature: 20 °C (68 °F)
- Website: www.vazhuthacaudcouncillor.com

Vazhuthacaud is located in Thiruvananthapuram, the capital of Kerala, India. The place is located 3 kilometres from the Thiruvananthapuram Central Railway Station and 8 kilometres from the Thiruvananthapuram International Airport.

Vazhuthacaud is a residential as well as commercial area. The All India Radio center in Trivandrum is in Vazhuthacaud. It is home to many major educational as well as cultural institutions. Govt. College for Women, Cottonhill School, Trivandrum Club, Sree Moolam Club, Subramaniam Hall are situated here. The Kerala Forest Department has its headquarters here. Government College for Women, Thiruvananthapuram, also known as H.H. The Maharaja's College for Women, is one of the oldest undergraduate and postgraduate women's college located in Trivandrum, Kerala. It was established in the year 1864. Cotton Hill Girls Higher Secondary School, the largest girls school in Asia, is located here. The Tagore theatre situating here is one of the longstanding cultural edifices of Thiruvananthapuram city.

Seven-century-old temple of Lord Sree Mahaganapathi is situated at Vazhuthacaud.

In the past, during the Murajapa of Sree Padmanabhaswamy Temple, people from present-day Kasaragod district used to reach Thiruvananthapuram by boat. Thus, Vazhuthakad Potty had a close connection with Nagancheri Illam. Since he had no descendants, he entrusted the then Karanavar of Naagancheri Illam to conduct the daily puja of his Thevaaramurthy Lord Ganapathi, and other sub-deities.

After the demise of Vazhuthakad Potty, an attempt was made to take the said Thevaaramurthy to Perumbavoor by boat, but when it reached Kollam district, the boatman temporarily lost his sight and had to bring it back to Vazhuthakad to conduct the pujas. Over time, the responsibility of running the Naagancheri Illam temple was entrusted to Brahmasree Shambhu Potty of Periyamana Illam. His descendants also used to worship in this temple. After two centuries it was again managed by Nagancherry Illam and in 1981 it was handed over to Public Trust.
