= Malapulayattam =

Indian folk dance

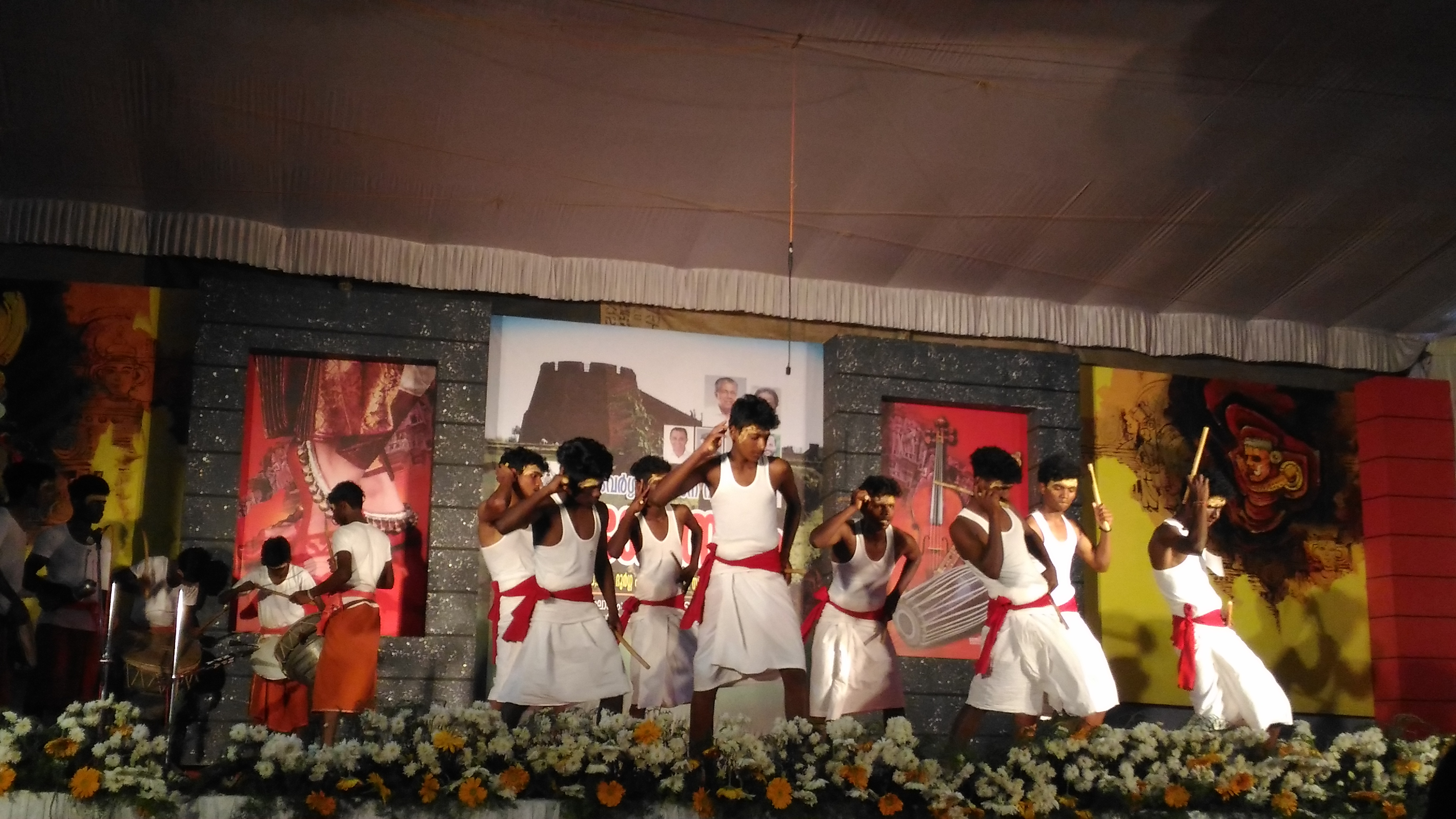
- Malapulayattam performance
- Native name: മലപ്പുലയാട്ടം (Malayalam)
- Genre: Ritual
- Instrument(s): tribal instruments like chik vadyam, kitimitti, kuzhal, kattavadyam, urumi etc.
- Origin: Kerala, India

Malapulayattam also known as Chikk Attam is a tribal dance performed by the Malapulayan tribals of Idukki district in Kerala, as part of worshiping the deities Mariamman, Kaliyamman and Meenakshi in their caste-related festivals.

This ritualistic dance is also performed in public spaces outside Idukki as part of public programs and tribal festivals.

== Overview ==
Malappulyars are a tribal community living in Marayur, Idukki district in Kerala. They are immigrants from Tamil Nadu. Their worship idols are deities like Mariamman, Kaliyamman and Meenakshi. Malappulayattam is a tribal dance form performed as part of worshiping the deities in their caste-related festivals.

There is a festival held in the Tamil month of Chithirai in connection with the Mariyamman temple in Malapulayan tribal area. Malapulayattam is mainly held as a part of this.

Malapulaya people also perform Malapulayattam or Chik Attam at all important events in their daily life including marriage, birth and even death and girl child's first menstruation. Only death has a different rhythm. Malapulayattam is a very physically demanding folk dance.

This ritualistic tribal dance is also performed in public spaces outside Idukki as part of public programs and tribal festivals.

== Dance ==
In Malappulayattam, everyone, including the elderly and the disabled, of the tribal colony, together steps in front of their clan deity. Males and females will step together in traditional attire. The dance is not supported by vocal singing. Both men and women dance together and dancers change frequently. Watchers later become dancers and dancers become watchers.

Dancers move their bodies forward and backward from a circle. The pace of the dance will also increase according to the pace of rhythms.

== Instruments ==
Tribal musical instruments such as chik vadyam, kitimitti, kuzhal, kattavadyam, urumi etc. are used for rhythm. While dancing, they do not sing any songs, instead they dance in a circle to the rhythm of musical instruments.

== Noted performances ==
In the 2022 national level tribal dance fest held in Visakhapatnam, Andhra Pradesh, which featured tribal dances from 19 states of India, the official group of Kerala, Malappalaya Dance Group from Kummittamkuzhi, Marayur, won the best team award.

== See also ==
- Irula Nritham
