= Kerala School Kalolsavam =

Secondary school art competitions in India

- Status: Active
- Genre: Youth Festival
- Frequency: Annually
- Venue: Kerala
- Country: India
- Founded: 1956; 70 years ago
- Founder: Dr. C. S. Venkiteswaran
- Most recent: 2025
- Participants: 14000+
- Area: High School, Higher Secondary school students (Class 8 to 12)
- Organiser: Department of General Education, Government of Kerala
- Sponsor: Kerala Infrastructure and Technology for Education (KITE)
- Website: ulsavam.kite.kerala.gov.in

The Kerala School Kalolsavam is an annual event organized by the Government of Kerala, featuring various art competitions for high school and higher secondary students across the state of Kerala. Established in 1956, it was known as the "Kerala State School Youth Festival" until 2024. The participants, students of classes 8 to 12, compete at the state level after advancing from their respective district competitions. The event typically takes place in December and January and is considered one of the largest cultural gatherings in Asia.

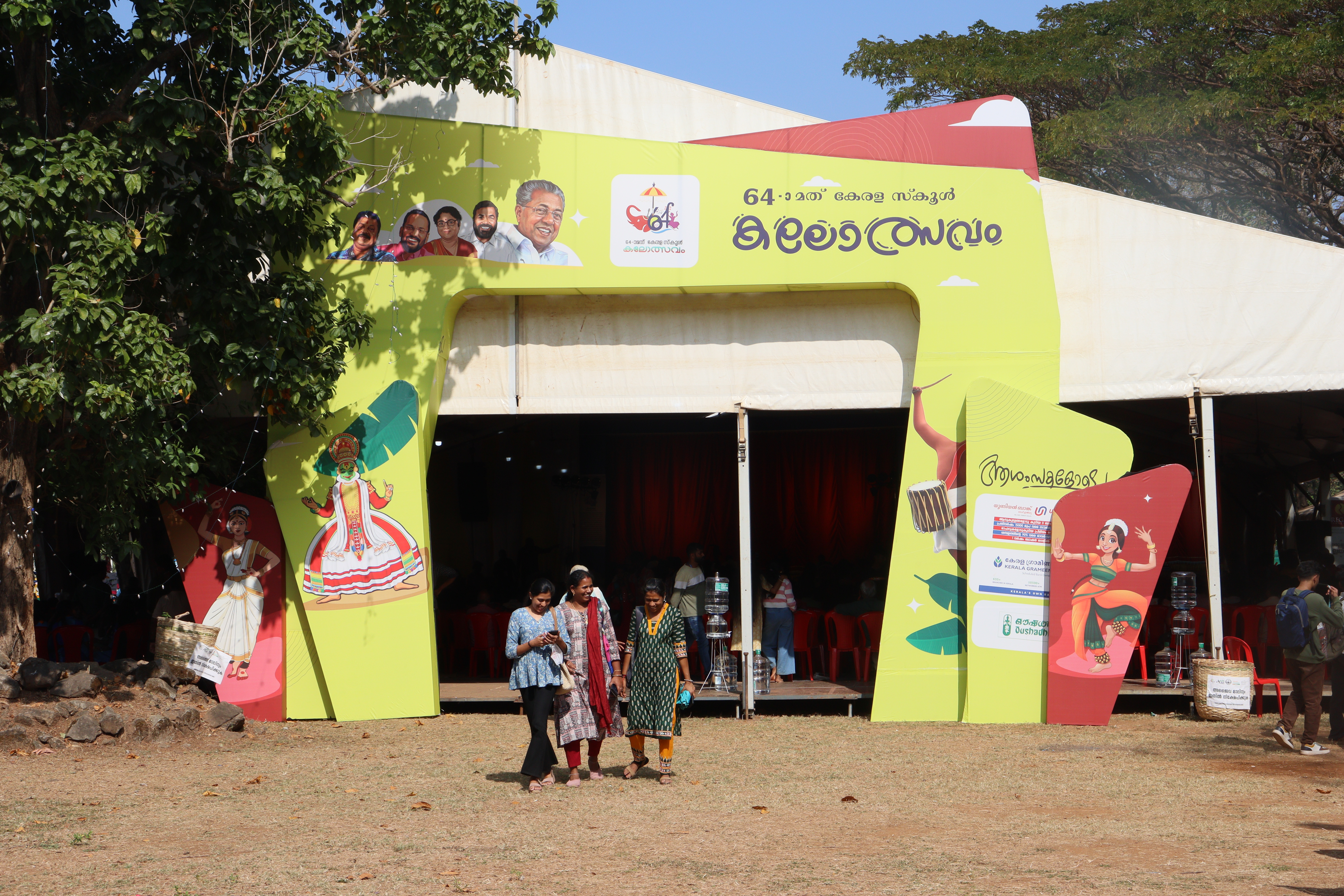
64th Kerala School Kalolsavam Venue

The current champions are Kannur District, who won the 64th Kerala School Kalolsavam held in Thrissur from January 14 to 18, 2026. This was the district's sixth victory overall, after their last win in 2024.

== History ==
Kerala School Kalolsavam is a unique festival in its structure and organization, overseen by the General Education Department as per guidelines drafted by experts. This annual event provides a platform for students to showcase their talents at various levels, from school to the state. Over its 53-year history, the festival has evolved significantly in both scope and spirit, becoming a hallmark of student talent in Kerala.

The event traces its roots back to 1956-57, when it was known as the 'School Yuvajanolsavam'. The idea for the festival was conceived by C. S. Venkiteswaran, who was inspired by an inter-university festival in Delhi. The first event, held at Sree Rama Varma High School in Ernakulam, was a modest one-day program with 200 participants. Over the years, more competitions were added, and the event expanded in both scale and duration, now spanning five days with around 10,000 participants.

From its early days, the festival has seen considerable growth. Initially a small event, it has become a major cultural festival supported by the government, local authorities, and representatives from various levels, including the Grama Panchayat, Corporation, and state legislators. In 2008-09, the event reached a milestone with a participant count of nearly 10,000, compared to the 200 participants in its inaugural year.

The year 1975 marked a turning point for the Kalolsavam, when traditional Kerala art forms like Kathakali music, Mohiniyattam, and Aksharaslokam were introduced. The festival continued to grow, incorporating more art forms such as Margamkali, Kuchipudi, and Yakshaganam. By the late 1980s, a prestigious Golden Cup made of 117.5 sovereigns of gold was introduced for the overall winning district, designed by Chirayankeezhu Srikandan Nair.

In 2000, the Millennium Trophy, featuring a dancing Nataraja figure, was introduced. Today, the Kalolsavam rewards winners with various trophies, cash prizes, and grace marks. Trichur Trophies has been the official provider of awards for the past 12 years, and in 2022 alone, around 14,000 trophies were distributed at the state level. The earlier system of awarding titles like 'Kalathilakam' and 'Kalaprathibha' has been discontinued to prevent unhealthy competition.

The School Wiki initiative by KITE features literary works of students from the Kerala School Kalolsavam from 2017 onwards.

The 63rd Kerala School Kalolsavam was held in Thiruvananthapuram from January 4 to 8, 2025 and Thrissur district crowned the championship. This was the district's sixth overall victory, with their last win in 1999.

The 64th edition of the Kerala School Kalolsavam took place from 14 to 18 January in Thrissur, the cultural capital of Kerala. This year the Kalolsavam marked a historic milestone when Siya Fathima, a Class 10 student from Kasaragod district was allowed to participate in the festival online, becoming the first student to do so in its history. The special permission was granted by the Kerala General Education Department after the student was diagnosed with vasculitis, a rare autoimmune disease, which prevented her from travelling to the event venue due to medical treatment and isolation requirements. With technical assistance from KITE, she took part in the competition remotely through live video conferencing, while judges assessed her performance in real time. Despite participating online, the student secured an A grade in her event, an achievement that was widely reported as a significant step towards inclusivity and the use of digital technology in Kerala’s premier school arts festival.

== Events ==
Events held at Kalolsavam, are grouped by art forms, with multiple competitions in each of the categories. The categories are folk arts, literary arts, musical arts, verbal arts, visual arts, and theatre arts. Some events are restricted to specific participants, with certain events only for boys, others only for girls, and some for both. Additionally, some events are exclusive to students from Arabic and Sanskrit medium schools.

== List of winners ==
The following list details the overall district winners of the Kerala State School Youth Festival (Kalolsavam) since its inception in 1957. Until 2009, only the top-performing district was recognized with a title. Starting in 2009, the introduction of the runner-up category expanded the awards to include second-place and third-place honors as well.

=== 2020s ===
Edition	Year	Final Result			Date(s)	Venue
Edition	Year	Winner(s)	1st Runner-Up	2nd Runner-Up	Date(s)	Venue
65th	2027	TBA	TBA	TBA	4-8 January	Ernakulam
64^{th}	2026	Kannur	Thrissur	Kozhikode	14-18 January	Thrissur
63^{rd}	2025	Thrissur	Palakkad	Kannur	4–8 January	Thiruvananthapuram
62^{nd}	2024	Kannur	Kozhikode	Palakkad	4–8 January	Kollam
61^{st}	2023	Kozhikode	Kannur & Palakkad	Thrissur	3–7 January	Kozhikode
60^{th}	2020	Palakkad	Kozhikode	Kannur	28 November – 1 December	Kasaragod (Kanhangad)

Note – Due to the impact of COVID-19 pandemic, no editions of the event were held in years 2021 and 2022.

=== 2010s ===
Edition	Year	Final Result			Date(s)	Venue
Edition	Year	Winner(s)	1st Runner-Up	2nd Runner-Up	Date(s)	Venue
59	2019	Palakkad	Kozhikode	Malappuram	7–9 December	Alappuzha
58	2018	Kozhikode	Palakkad	Malappuram	6–10 January	Thrissur
57	2017	Kozhikode	Palakkad	Kannur	16–22 January	Kannur
56	2016	Kozhikode	Palakkad	Kannur	19–25 January	Thiruvananthapuram
55	2015	Kozhikode & Palakkad	Thrissur	Kannur	3–7 January	Kozhikode
54	2014	Kozhikode	Palakkad	Thrissur	19–25 January	Palakkad
53	2013	Kozhikode	Thrissur	Malappuram	14–20 January	Malappuram
52	2012	Kozhikode	Thrissur	Malappuram	16–22 January	Thrissur
51	2011	Kozhikode	Thrissur	Kannur	18–23 January	Kottayam
50	2010	Kozhikode	Kannur	Thrissur	9–15 January	Kozhikode

=== 2000s ===
Edition	Year	Final Result			Venue
Edition	Year	Winner(s)	1st Runner-Up	2nd Runner-Up	Venue
49	2009	Kozhikode	Thrissur	Kannur	Thiruvananthapuram
48	2008	Kozhikode	Not awarded		Kollam
47	2007	Kozhikode	Not awarded		Kannur
46	2006	Palakkad	Not awarded		Ernakulam
45	2005	Kozhikode	Not awarded		Malappuram (Tirur)
44	2004	Kozhikode	Not awarded		Thrissur
43	2003	Ernakulam	Not awarded		Alappuzha
42	2002	Kozhikode	Not awarded		Kozhikode
41	2001	Kozhikode	Not awarded		Idukki (Thodupuzha)
40	2000	Ernakulam & Kannur	Not awarded		Palakkad

=== 1990s ===
Edition	Year	Final Result	Venue
Edition	Year	Winner	Venue
39	1999	Thrissur	Kollam
38	1998	Kannur	Thiruvananthapuram
37	1997	Kannur	Ernakulam
36	1996	Thrissur	Kottayam
35	1995	Ernakulam	Kannur
34	1994	Thrissur	Kozhikode
33	1993	Kozhikode	Thrissur
32	1992	Kozhikode	Malappuram (Tirur)
31	1991	Kozhikode	Kasaragod
30	1990	Ernakulam	Alappuzha

=== 1980s ===
Edition	Year	Final Result	Venue
Edition	Year	Winner	Venue
29	1989	Thiruvananthapuram	Ernakulam
28	1988	Thiruvananthapuram	Kollam
27	1987	Thiruvananthapuram	Kozhikode
26	1986	Thiruvananthapuram	Thrissur
25	1985	Thiruvananthapuram	Ernakulam
24	1984	Thiruvananthapuram	Kottayam
23	1983	Thiruvananthapuram	Ernakulam
22	1982	Thiruvananthapuram	Kannur
21	1981	Thiruvananthapuram	Palakkad
20	1980	Thiruvananthapuram	Thiruvananthapuram

=== 1970s ===
Edition	Year	Final Result	Venue
Edition	Year	Winner	Venue
19	1979	Kottayam	Kottayam
18	1978	Thiruvananthapuram	Thrissur
17	1977	Thiruvananthapuram	Ernakulam
16	1976	Thiruvananthapuram	Kozhikode
15	1975	Kottayam	Kottayam (Pala)
14	1974	Thiruvananthapuram	Alappuzha (Mavelikkara)
13	1971	Alappuzha	Alappuzha
12	1970	Thrissur (Irinjalakkuda)	Thrissur (Irinjalakkuda)

Note – Due to political and administrative issues in the state, no editions of the event were held in years 1972 and 1973.

=== 1960s ===
Edition	Year	Final Result	Venue
Edition	Year	Winner	Venue
11	1969	Thrissur (Irinjalakkuda)	Kottayam
10	1968	Alappuzha	Thrissur
09	1965	Kollam	Palakkad (Shoranur)
08	1964	Alappuzha	Pathanamthitta (Thiruvalla)
07	1963	Thiruvananthapuram	Thrissur
06	1962	Alappuzha	Kottayam (Changanassery)
05	1961	Thiruvananthapuram	Thiruvananthapuram
04	1960	Kannur (Thalassery)	Kozhikode

Note – Due to political and administrative issues in the state, no editions of the event were held in years 1966 and 1967.

=== 1950s ===
Edition	Year	Final Result	Venue
Edition	Year	Winner	Venue
03	1959	Kozhikode	Palakkad (Chittur)
02	1958	Thiruvananthapuram	Thiruvananthapuram
01	1957	North Malabar (Kasaragod, Kannur & Wayanad)	Ernakulam

=== District Ranking ===
The following is a list of district-wise winners of the Kerala School Kalolsavam since its inception. The winner of the first edition, North Malabar, is not included in this list as it represented a group of multiple districts.

No.	District(s)	1st place, gold medalist(s)	2nd place, silver medalist(s)	3rd place, bronze medalist(s)	Total Victory	Best result
1º	Kozhikode	21	3	0	24	Winner (1959 • 1991–1993 • 2001 • 2002 • 2004 • 2005 • 2007–2018 • 2023)
2º	Thiruvananthapuram	17	0	0	17	Winner (1958 • 1961 • 1963 • 1974 • 1976–1978 • 1980–1989)
3º	Thrissur	6	5	3	14	Winner (1969 • 1970 • 1994 • 1996 • 1999 • 2025)
4º	Kannur	6	2	7	14	Winner (1960 • 1997 • 1998 • 2000 • 2024 • 2026)
5º	Palakkad	4	6	1	11	Winner (2006 • 2015 • 2019 • 2020)
6º	Ernakulam	4	0	0	4	Winner (1990 • 1995 • 2000 • 2003)
7º	Alappuzha	4	0	0	4	Winner (1962 • 1964 • 1968 • 1971)
8º	Kottayam	2	0	0	2	Winner (1975 • 1979)
9º	Kollam	1	0	0	1	Winner (1965)
10º	Malappuram	0	0	4	4	2nd Runner-up (2012 • 2013 • 2018 • 2019)
11º	Kasaragod	0	0	0	0	8th (2016)
12º	Wayanad	0	0	0	0	9th (2020)
13º	Pathanamthitta	0	0	0	0	12th (2011–2013 • 2015 • 2025)
14º	Idukki	0	0	0	0	13th (2015 • 2025)

== Notable participants ==
The following is a list of notable people who participated in the Kerala School Kalolsavam (formerly the Kerala State School Youth Festival) and later became prominent in cinema, music, television, or public life.

=== Celebrities who won Kalathilakam or Kalaprathibha ===
Celebrity	Title	Year	Known for
Vineeth Radhakrishnan	Kalaprathibha	1986	Actor, classical dancer
Vineeth Kumar	Kalaprathibha	1988	Actor, director
Divyaa Unni	Kalathilakam	1990, 1991	Actress, dancer
Vinduja Menon	Kalathilakam	1991	Actress
Manju Warrier	Kalathilakam	1992, 1995	Actress, dancer
Shivajith Padmanabhan	Kalaprathibha	1998, 1999	Actor, dancer
Ambili Devi	Kalathilakam	2001	Film and television actress

=== Celebrities with other awards ===
Celebrity	Title	Year	Known for
K. J. Yesudas	First prize, Classical Music	1958	Playback singer
P. Jayachandran	First prize, Mridangam	1958	Playback singer
Perumbavoor G. Raveendranath	First prize, Classical Music	1960	Music director
E. T. Mohammed Basheer	First prize, Elocution	1962	Politician
Sujatha Mohan	First prize, Light Music	1974	Playback singer
K. S. Chithra	First prize, Light Music	1978	Playback singer
M. Jayachandran	Multiple prizes in music	1983–1985	Music director
Veena George	First prize, Mono Act	1992	Politician, former journalist
Vineeth Sreenivasan	First prize, Mappila Song	2000	Actor, singer, director
Sooraj Thelakkad	Fifth place, A grade, Mimicry	2012	Actor, television personality

=== Celebrities who held district-level titles or participated ===
Celebrity	Achievement(s)	Known for
Navya Nair	Alappuzha district Kalathilakam, 2001; state participant	Actress
Kavya Madhavan	Multiple sub-district Kalathilakam titles	Actress
Jomol	Member of Kozhikode Providence School dance team	Actress
Reshmi Soman	Ottan Thullal winner, 1995 and 1996	Television actress
Anju Aravind	Participant	Actress
Thara Kalyan	Participant	Actress, dancer
Guinness Pakru	Participated in Mono Act and Kathaprasangam	Actor, comedian
Sharreth	First prize in a music competition	Music director, singer
M. K. Sankaran Namboothiri	Participant	Classical vocalist
A. K. Antony	Elocution participant	Former Kerala Chief Minister

== Gallery ==
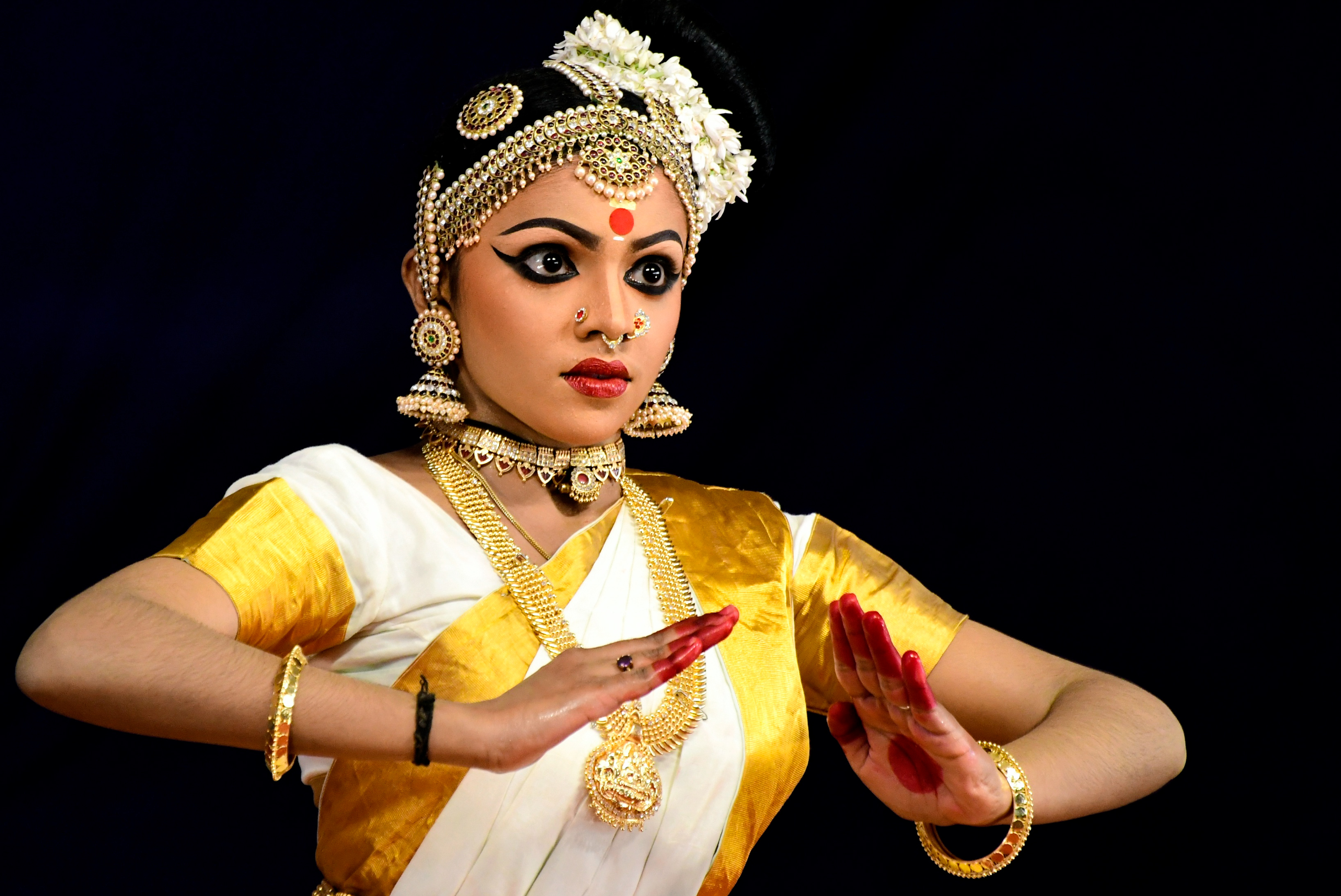

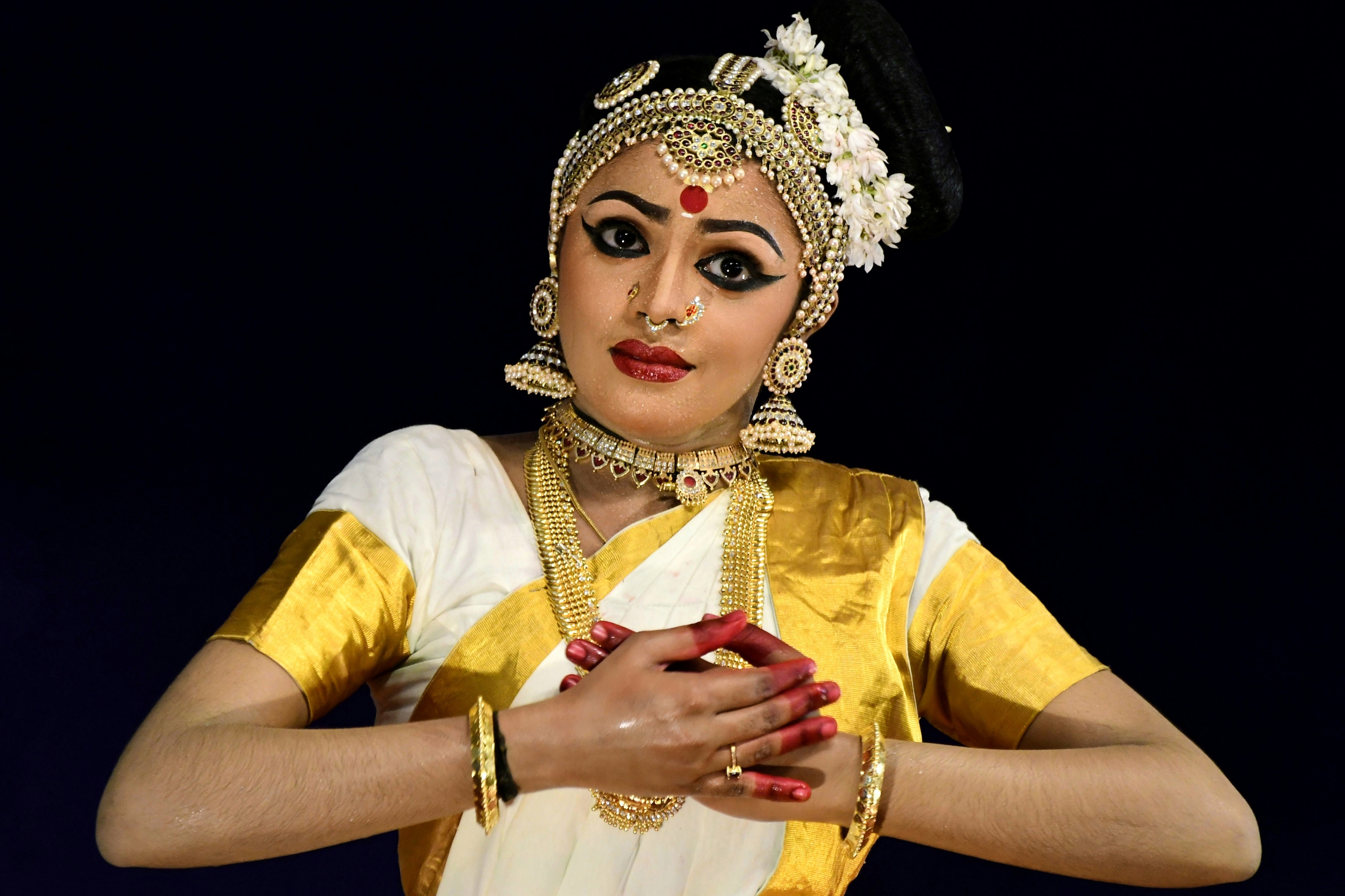

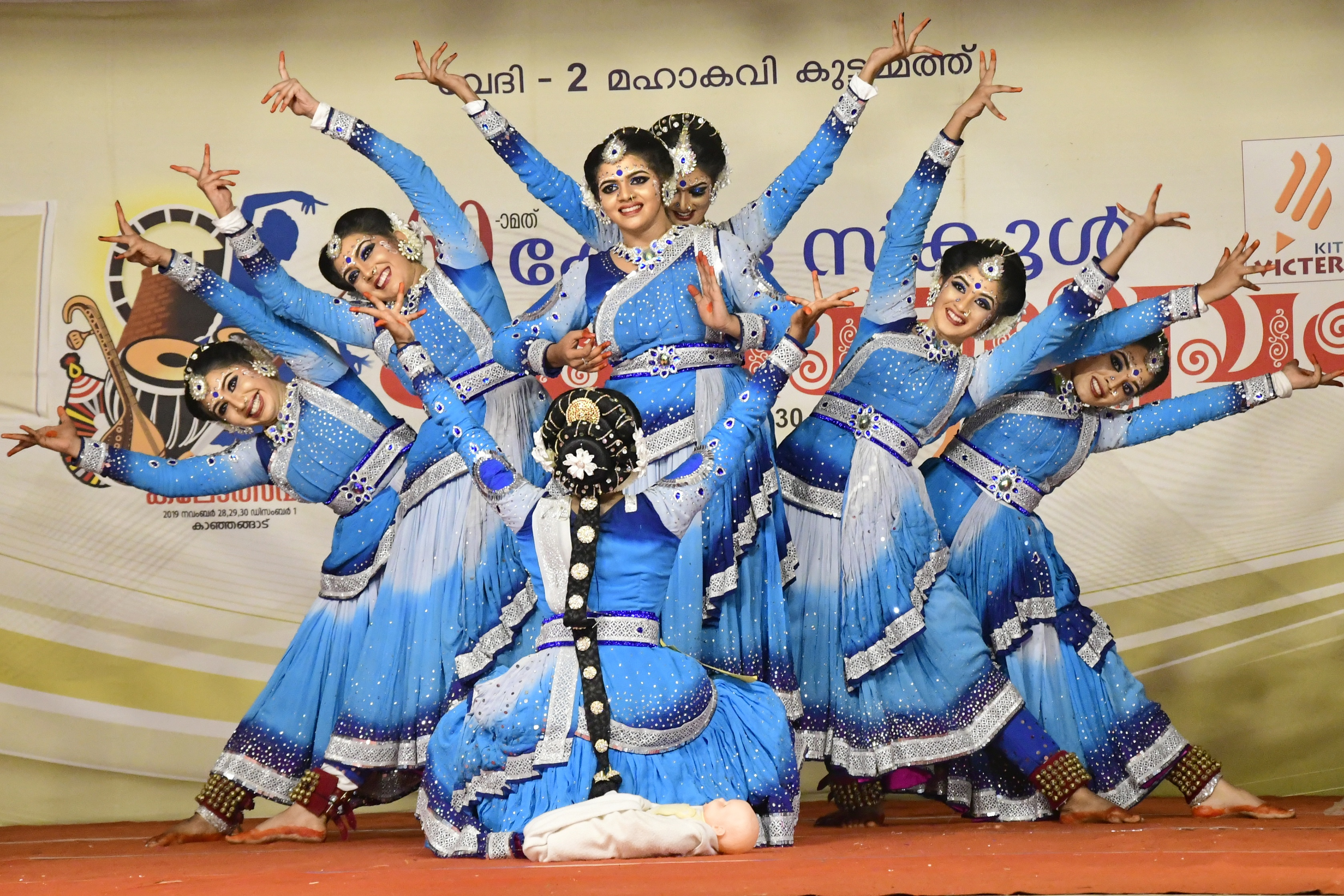

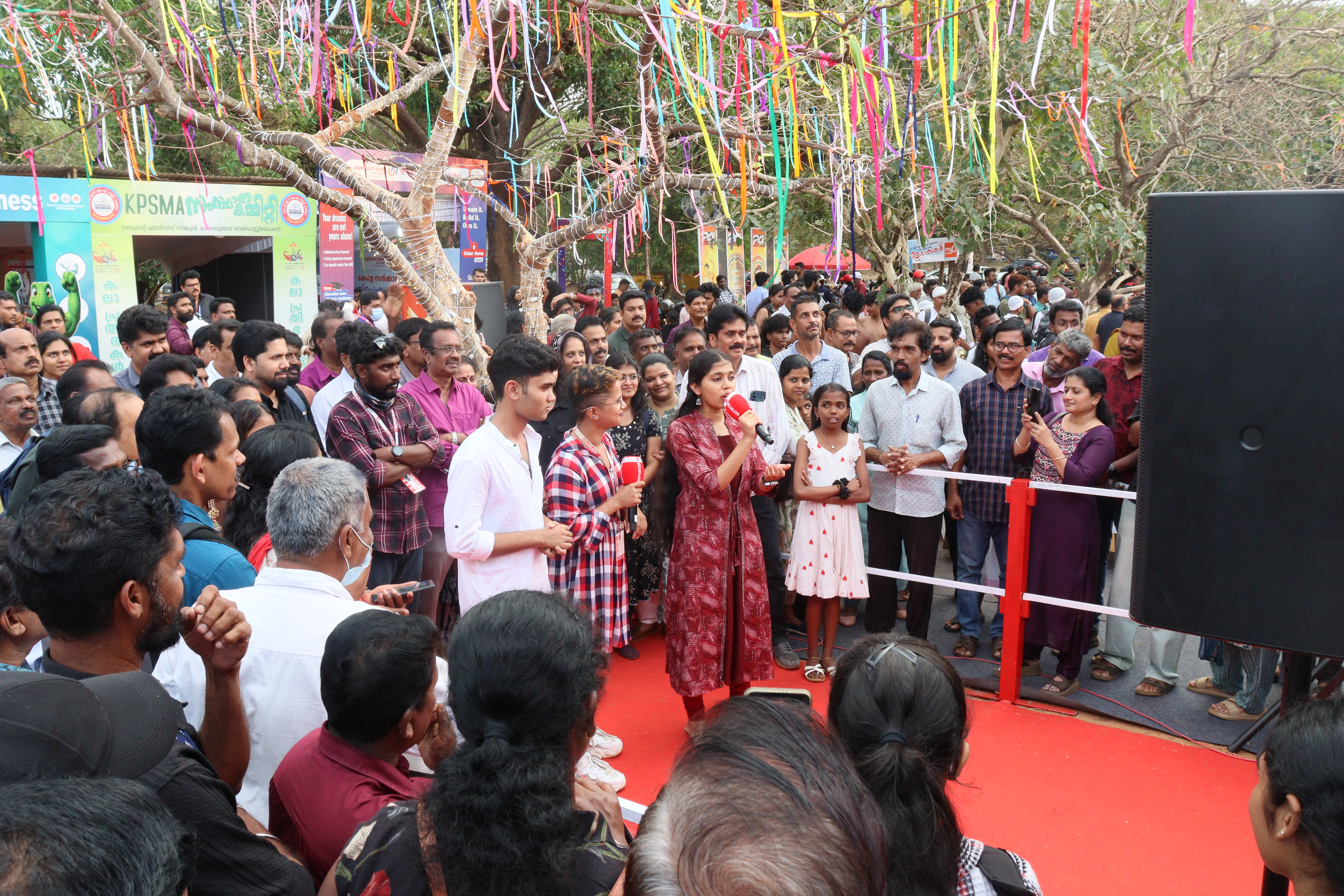

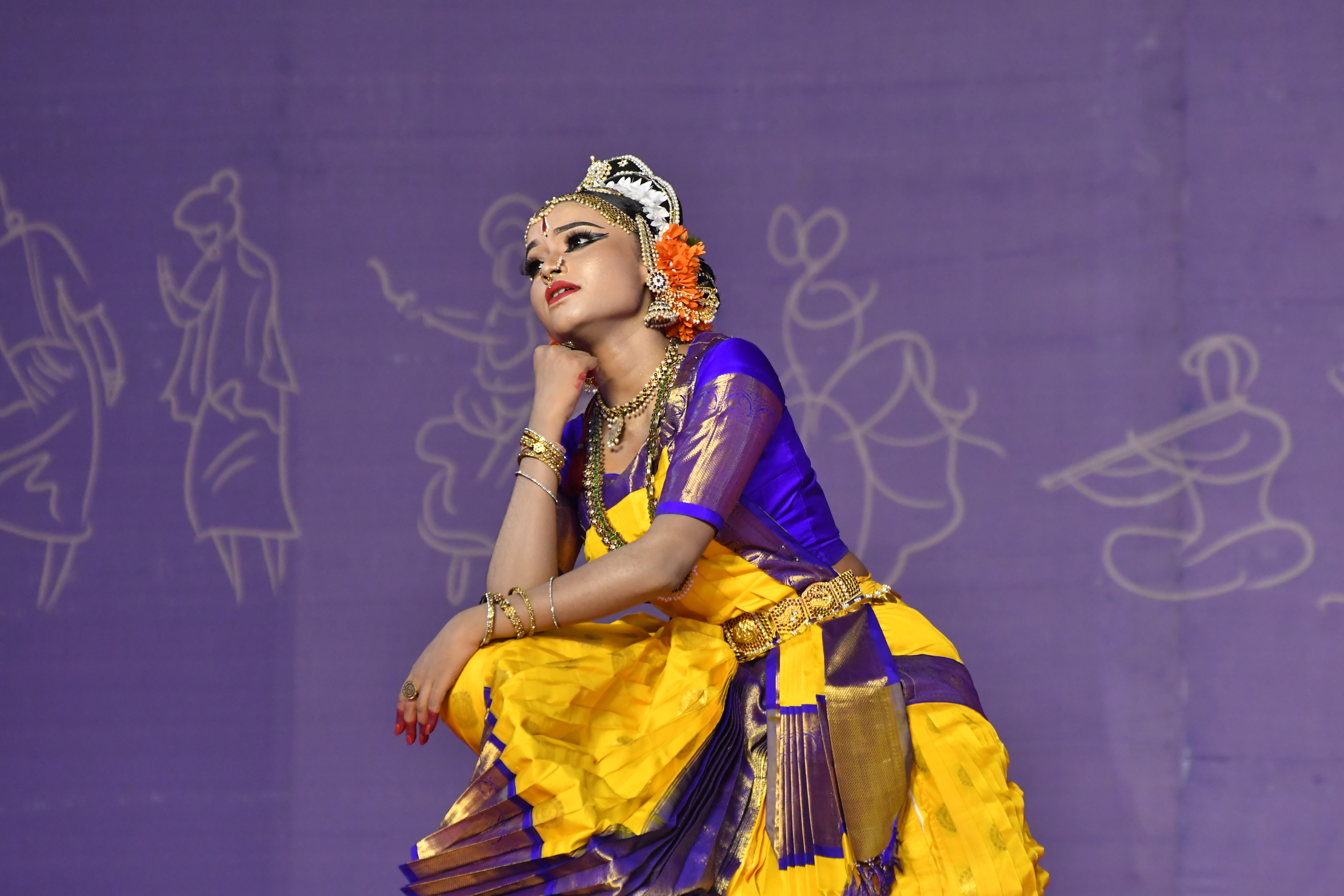

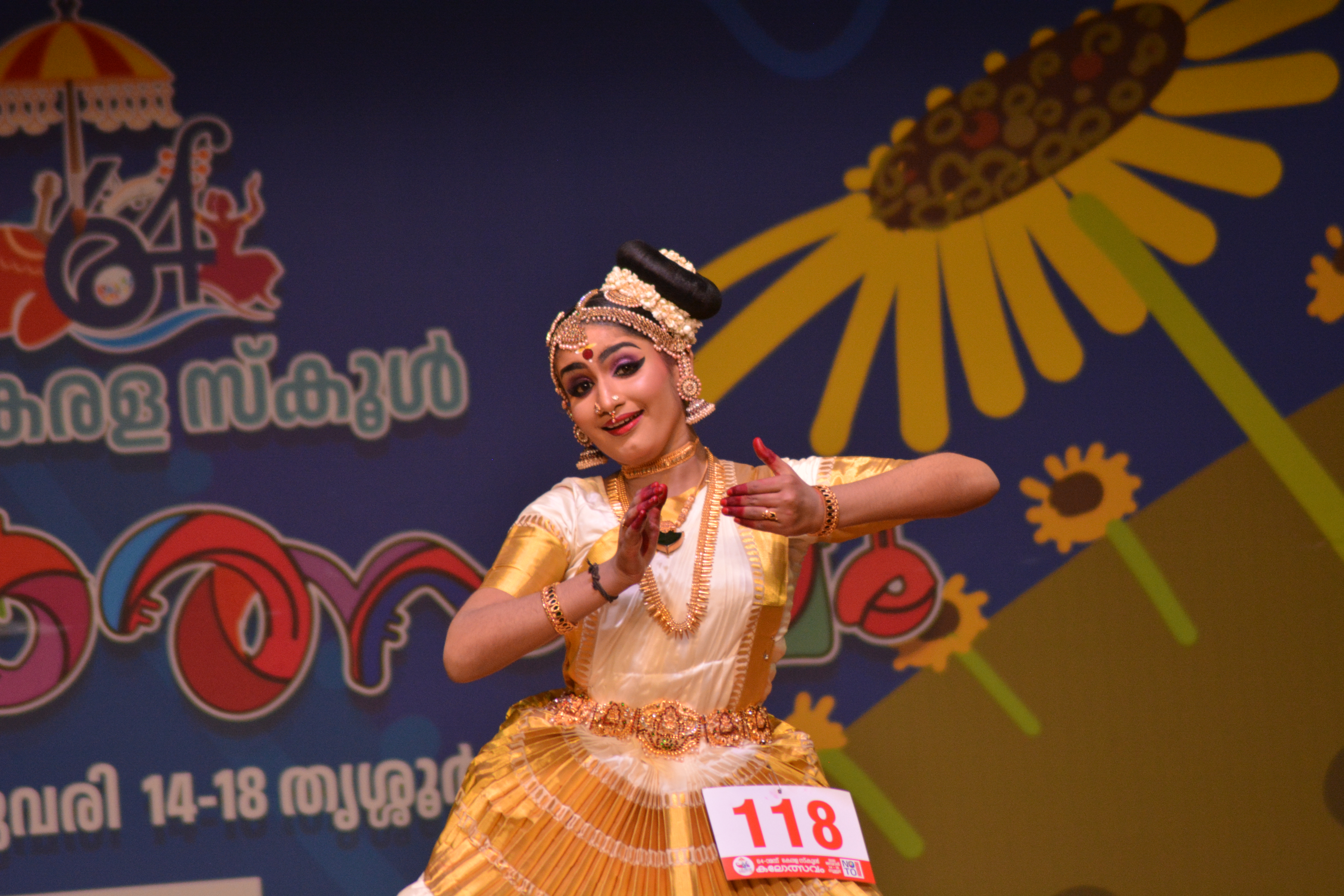

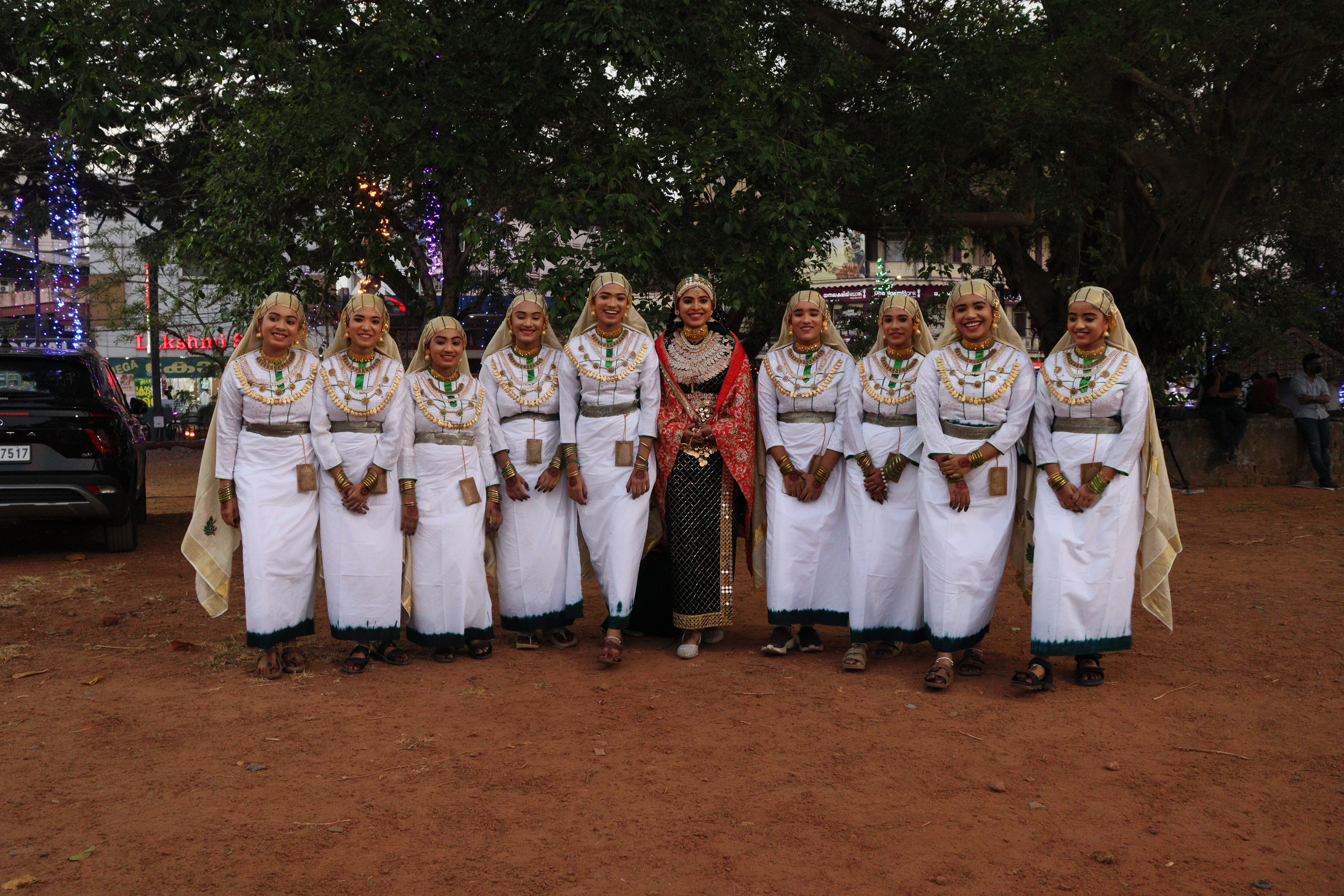

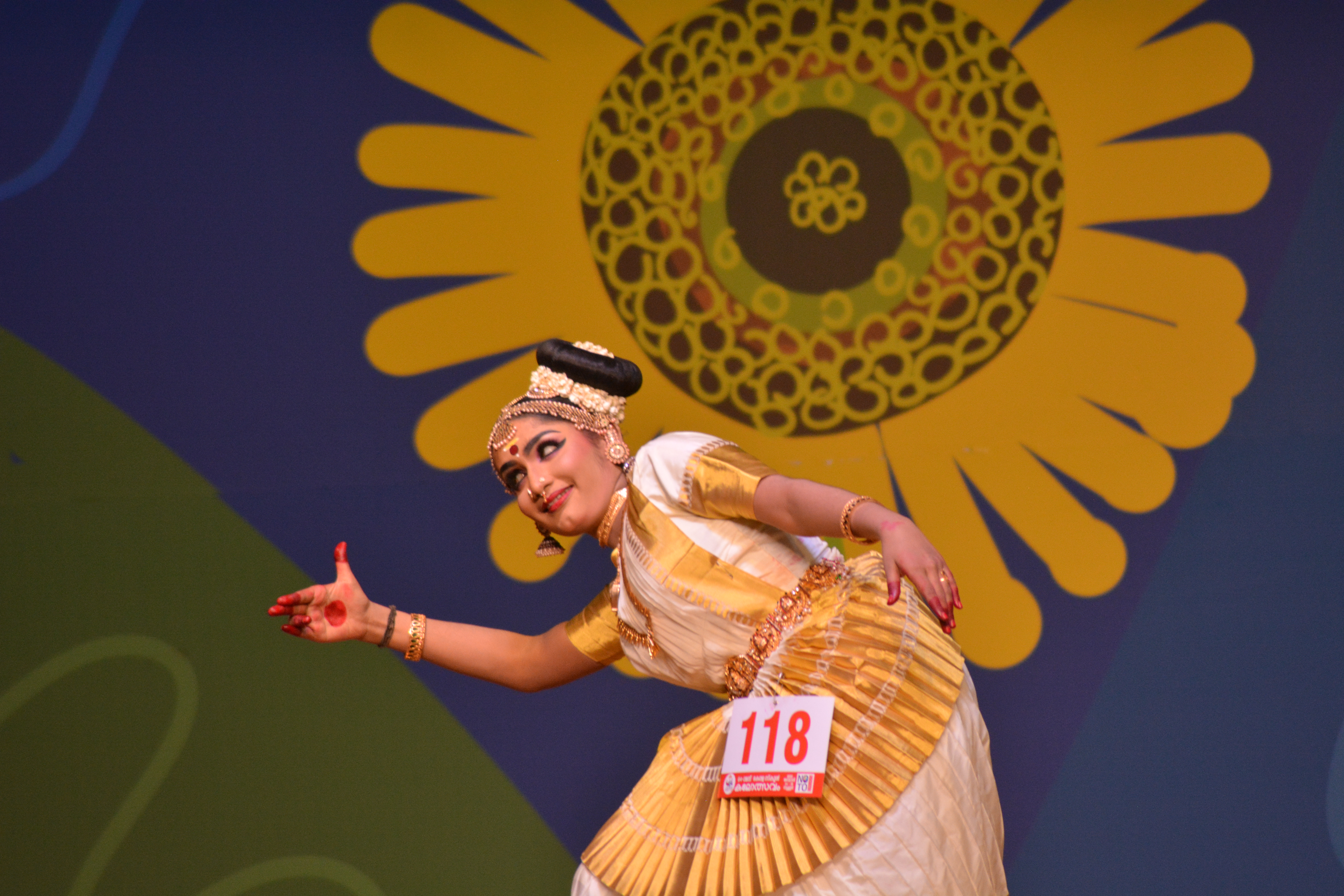
