= Demographics of Kerala =

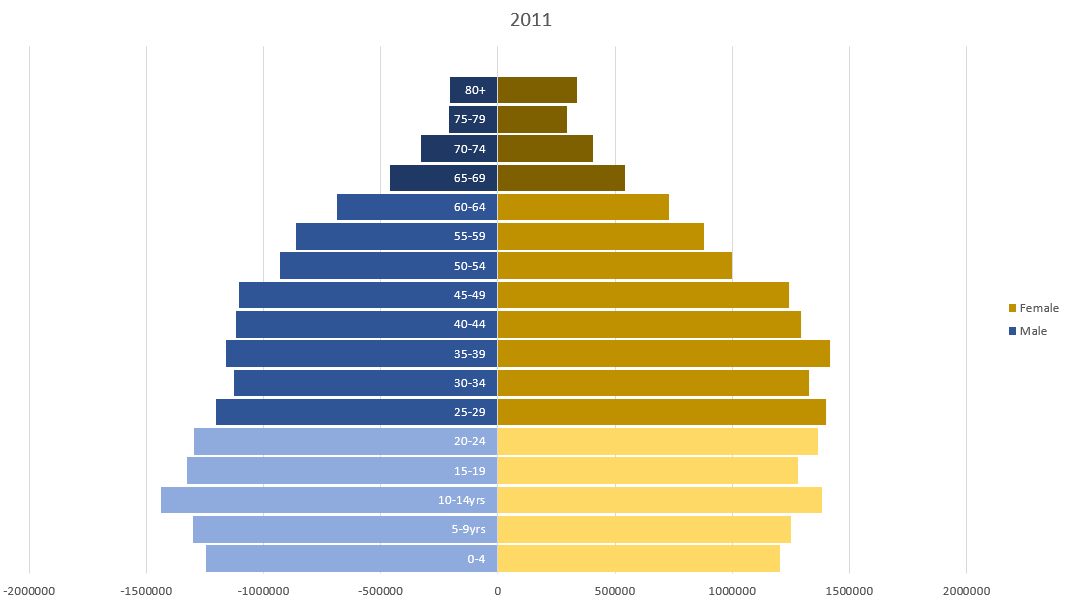
- Population pyramid taken from the 2011 census
- Population: 357.58 lakhs (2024 estimate)
- Density: 859 per sq.km
- Growth rate: 3.31% yearly (2021 estimate)
- Birth rate: 9.64 per 1000 pop. (2024 estimate)
- Death rate: 8.77 per 1000 pop. (2024 estimate)
- Life expectancy
  - male: 75 years
  - female: 80.15 years
- Fertility rate: 1.19 births per woman (2024 estimate)
- Infant mortality: 5.03 per 1000 live births (2024 estimate)
- Net migration rate: −0.08 per 1000 (2019 estimate)

Age structure
- 0–14 years: 19%
- 15–64 years: 70%
- 65 and over: 12%

Sex ratio
- Total: 0.97 males/female
- At birth: 1.04 males/female

Kerala is a state in south-western India. Most of Kerala's 33.4 million people (as per 2011 census) are ethnically Malayalis (Malayalam speakers). Additional ancestries derive from millennia of trade links across the Arabian Sea, whereby people of Arab, Jewish, Syriac, Portuguese, English, Chinese and other ethnic groups settled in Kerala. Many of these immigrants intermarried with native Malayalam speakers resulting in formation of many Muslim and Christian groups in Kerala.

Malayalam is Kerala's official language and is spoken by at least 97% of the people of Kerala; the next most common language is English. Tamil is spoken mainly in the districts bordering Tamil Nadu, especially Idukki and Palakkad. Tulu is spoken in the northern parts of Kasaragod district. In addition, Kerala is home to 321,000 indigenous tribal Adivasis (1.10% of the populace). Some 63% of tribals reside in the eastern districts of Wayanad (where 35.82% are tribals), Palakkad (1.02%), and Idukki (15.66%). These groups, including the Paniyars, Mooppans, Irulars, Kurumbars, and Mudugars, speak their own native languages. Cholanaikkan tribe in the Silent Valley National Park were contacted only in the 1970s and they are the most isolated tribe in the state.

== Population ==
Population density of Kerala
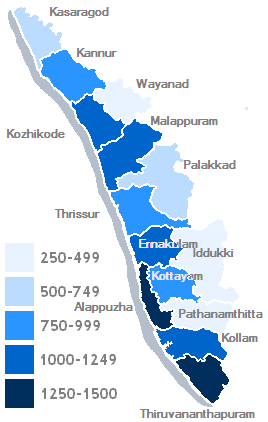
Kerala's districts, shaded by population density (inhabitants per km^{2})

Kerala is home to 2.76% of India's population, and at 859 persons per km^{2}; its land is three times as densely settled as the rest of India. Kerala's western coastal regions are the most densely settled with population of 2,022 persons per km^{2}, 2.5 times the overall population density of the state, 859 persons per km^{2}, leaving the eastern hills and mountains comparatively sparsely populated. However, Kerala's population growth rate is far lower than the national average, although Kerala's population more than doubled between 1951 and 1991 – adding 15.6 million people to reach a total of 29.1 million residents in 1991 – the population stood at 31.8 million by 2001 and 33.3 million in 2011. Kerala's people are most densely settled in the coastal region, leaving the eastern hills and mountains comparatively sparsely populated. Kerala is the second-most urbanised major state in the country with 47.7% urban population according to the 2011 Census of India.

Hinduism is followed by the majority of Keralites (54.7%). The major religions followed in Kerala are Hinduism (54.7% — Hinduism in Kerala), Islam (26.6%) and Christianity (18.4%).

Kerala also had a tiny Jewish population until recently, said to date from 587 BC when they fled the occupation of Jerusalem by Nebuchadnezzar. The 2001 Indian census recorded only 51 Jews in Kerala. The Paradesi Synagogue in Kochi is the oldest synagogue in the Commonwealth of Nations.

The state has many famous temples, mosques, and churches. The oldest church in India is found in Kerala, believed to be established by St. Thomas, the disciple of Jesus Christ and the Cheramaan Juma Mosque is considered to be the oldest mosque in the Indian subcontinent which was built by an Islamic missionary Malik Dinar.

Historical population
Year	Population	Decadal growth
2011	33,406,061	4.91
2001	31,841,374	9.43
1991	29,098,518	14.32
1981	25,453,680	19.24
1971	21,347,375	26.29
1961	16,903,715	24.76
1951	13,549,118	22.82
1941	11,031,541	16.04
1931	9,507,050	21.85
1921	7,802,127	9.16
1911	7,147,673	11.75
1901	6,392,620	–

=== Population graph of Kerala from 2005 to 20 ===
Source:

== Features ==
Distribution of Population in Malappuram, the most populous district of Kerala (2011). The distribution is similar to this pattern in every part of the state. The western Arabian Sea coastline is densely populated while the eastern hilly region adjacent to the Western Ghats is sparsely populated compared to its western coastal counterpart.

=== Social development ===
Kerala ranks highest in India with respect to social development indices such as elimination of poverty, primary education and healthcare. This resulted from significant efforts begun in 1911 by the erstwhile Princely states of Cochin and Travancore to boost healthcare and education among the people. This central focus – deemed unusual in India – was then maintained after Kerala's post-independence inauguration as a state. Thus, Kerala has the highest literacy rate in India of 93.91% (2011); and life expectancy is now the highest in India. The suicide rates in Kerala are the highest in India. As per the 2011 census, Kerala and Puducherry are the only domiciles in India with a female-to-male ratio higher than 0.99. The ratio for Kerala is 1.084 – 1084 females per 1000 males – while the national figure is 0.940. It is also one of the states in India to have sub-replacement fertility.

UNICEF and the World Health Organization (WHO) designated Kerala as the world's first "baby-friendly state" via its "Baby Friendly Hospital Initiative". The state is also known for Ayurveda, a traditional system of medicine – this traditional expertise is currently drawing increasing numbers of medical tourists. However, drawbacks to this situation includes the population's steady ageing – indeed, 11.2% of Keralites are age 60 or over.

Kerala's unusual socioeconomic and demographic situation was summarised by author and environmentalist Bill McKibben:

=== Expatriation and Emigration ===
As of 2011, a total of 2,280,000 Keralites reside outside India. Largest populations are found in UAE (883,313) and US (68,076).

The major concentrations of expat Keralites are in the following nations: (figures as of 2011)

- UAE – 883,313
- United States – 68,076 (mainly U.S. Citizens)
- KSA – 574,739
- Oman – 195,300
- Qatar – 410,000
- Kuwait – 127,782
- Bahrain – 216,000
- United Kingdom – 44,640
- Canada – 28,000
- Australia – 50,000
- Portugal – 2,000
- Italy – 25,000
- Germany – 10,000

=== Diversity ===
There are more than 2,500,000 recent migrants living in Kerala, mostly from Assam and West Bengal, constituting more than 8% of the population. There are also migrants from Bihar, Jharkhand, Chhattisgarh, Orissa, and the North East.

Studies indicate that by the time of 2026 state elections, migrants will become a crucial voting block in many of the constituencies in Thiruvananthapuram, Kollam, Kochi, Kozhikode, Thrissur and Kannur districts.

== Lists ==
=== Urban centres ===
According to 2011 Census of India, Kerala has six 1.5 million-plus urban agglomerations: Kochi, Kozhikode, Kollam, Kannur, Thiruvananthapuram, and Thrissur, all of which has a population of at least 1.5 million. Over a third of Keralites live in these large cities (a higher percentage than any other state), and over half the population lives in urban centres.

Thiruvananthapuram is the largest city in Kerala in terms of population

Largest cities or towns in Kerala 2011 Census of India As per the population within their respective municipal corporation/municipality limits
Rank		District	Pop.
1	Thiruvananthapuram	Thiruvananthapuram district	968,990
2	Kozhikode	Kozhikode district	609,224
3	Kochi	Ernakulam district	602,046
4	Kollam	Kollam district	388,288
5	Thrissur	Thrissur district	315,957
6	Kannur	Kannur district	232,486
7	Alappuzha	Alappuzha district	180,856
8	Kottayam	Kottayam district	138,283
9	Palakkad	Palakkad district	131,019
10	Manjeri	Malappuram district	97,102

The above table lists Kerala cities in terms of their respective corporation statistics.

According to the 2011 Census, 7 of the top 50 most populous metropolitan areas in India belong to Kerala. They are Kochi, Kozhikode, Kollam, Malappuram, Thiruvananthapuram, Kannur and Thrissur ranking 17, 19, 21, 25, 26, 27 and 48 respectively.

=== Most populous urban agglomerations ===
The following is a list of most populous urban agglomerations in the Kerala state of India. Population statistics indicated are as of 2011 census.

(Note that this is a list of metropolitan (UA) population and does not indicate the corporation populations. Cities in India are officially ranked in terms of these numbers)

Rank	UA	Population (2025)	Population (2011)	Population (2001)	District
1	Kozhikode	6,123,872	2,030,519	715,681	Kozhikode
2	Kochi	5,077,670	2,117,990	1,355,972	Ernakulam
3	Kollam	3,074,562	1,110,005	380,091	Kollam
4	Thiruvananthapuram	2,946,119	1,679,754	1,089,635	Thiruvananthapuram
5	Malappuram	2,409,567	1,698,645	170,409	Malappuram
6	Thrissur	2,371,675	1,854,783	103,122	Thrissur
7	Kannur	1,812,143	1,642,892	498,207	Kannur
8	Kottayam	1,043,314	357,533	172,878	Kottayam
9	Thalassery	1,038,647	642,892	448,407	Kannur
10	Ponnani	1,033,647	548,892	298,207	Malappuram
11	Cherthala	555,408	455,408	141,558	Alappuzha
12	Kayamkulam	547,091	527,091	68,585	Alappuzha
13	Palakkad	393,566	293,566	283,369	Palakkad
14	Alappuzha	341,072	241,072	282,675	Alappuzha
15	Ottappalam	338,238	238,238	49,242	Palakkad
16	Kanhangad	329,706	229,706	129,367	Kasaragod
17	Kasaragod	292,761	192,761	75,968	Kasaragod
18	Changanassery	227,971	127,971	51,967	Kottayam
19	Chalakkudy	214,901	114,901	48,380	Thrissur
20	Kothamangalam	214,574	114,574	37,173	Ernakulam

=== Ethnic groups ===
The vast majority of residents of Kerala are Malayalis, but there are many smaller ethnic groups including Tuluvas, Tamils, Kannadigas, Konkanis and various tribals. In addition, as of early 2013 there are close to 2.5 million (7.5% of state population) migrant workers from other states of India in Kerala.

=== Language ===
Languages of Kerala (2011)
1. Malayalam (97.0%)
2. Tamil (1.49%)
3. Others (1.50%)

Kerala is the most unilingual state of India in which about 97% of the total population speak Malayalam as their Native language. In addition, there is a significant Tamil population in Idukki district, which accounts for 17.48% of its total population. Tulu and Kannada are spoken in the northern portions of Kasaragod district, each of which account for 8.77% and 4.23% of total population in the district respectively. Konkani speakers are scattered throughout with major concentration in Kochi and Kasargod. Kochi also as a few Gujarati and Kacchhi speakers. There are also various minor tribal languages like Irula, Kuruma, Malavedan, Kanikkaran, Kurichiya, etc., found in the mountainous regions, particularly in Wayanad and Idukki. Dakhini Urdu is spoken In Manjeshwar, Uppala and Kasaragod by the Muslim population.

=== Religion ===
Hindus constitute 54.7% of the population of Kerala, followed by Islam with 26.6% population and Christianity at third with 18.4% population as per 2011 census.

Religious Demographics of Kerala (1901–2011)
Census Year	Hindus		Decadal Growth rate (%)	Muslims		Decadal Growth rate (%)	Christians		Decadal Growth rate (%)	Total Population		Decadal Growth rate (%)
1901	4,378,305	68.5%	N/A	1,119,473	17.5%	N/A	891,767	13.9%	N/A	6,389,545	100.0%	N/A
1911	4,762,393	66.8%	+8.77	1,263,602	17.7%	+12.87	1,101,289	15.5%	+23.50	7,127,284	100.0%	+11.55
1921	5,052,039	64.9%	+6.08	1,360,180	17.5%	+7.64	1,376,354	17.7%	+24.98	7,788,573	100.0%	+9.28
1931	6,021,982	63.4%	+19.20	1,624,112	17.1%	+19.40	1,856,024	19.5%	+34.85	9,502,118	100.0%	+22.00
1941	6,699,600	61.8%	+11.25	1,883,786	17.4%	+11.60	2,263,888	20.9%	+21.98	10,847,274	100.0%	+14.16
1951	8,344,351	61.6%	+24.55	2,374,598	17.5%	+26.05	2,825,720	20.9%	+24.82	13,544,669	100.0%	+24.87
1961	10,282,568	60.9%	+23.23	3,027,639	17.9%	+27.50	3,587,365	21.2%	+26.95	16,897,572	100.0%	+24.75
1971	12,683,277	59.4%	+23.35	4,162,718	19.5%	+37.49	4,494,089	21.1%	+25.28	21,340,084	100.0%	+26.29
1981	14,801,347	58.2%	+16.70	5,409,687	21.3%	+30.00	5,233,865	20.6%	+16.46	25,444,899	100.0%	+19.24
1991	16,668,587	57.3%	+12.62	6,788,354	23.3%	+25.49	5,621,510	19.3%	+7.41	29,078,451	100.0%	+14.28
2001	17,920,105	56.3%	+7.51	7,863,842	24.7%	+15.84	6,057,427	19.0%	+7.75	31,841,374	100.0%	+9.50
2011	18,282,492	54.9%	+2.02	8,873,472	26.6%	+12.84	6,141,269	18.4%	+1.38	33,406,061	100.0%	+4.91
Indicates Least growth rate			Indicates Most growth rate			Source: Census of India (1901–2011)						

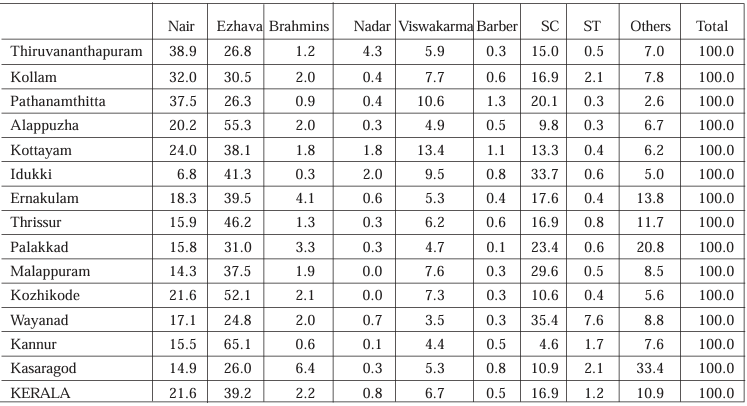
Percent Distribution of District Population by Hindu Castes

Detailed breakdown of religious demographics
Religion	2001	%	2011	%
Hinduism	17,883,449	56.16	18,282,492	54.73
Islam	7,863,842	24.70	8,873,472	26.56
Christianity	6,057,427	19.02	6,141,269	18.38
Buddhism	2,027	>0.01	4,752	0.01
Jainism	4,528	0.01	4,489	0.01
Sikhism	2,762	>0.01	3,814	0.01
Other	2,256	>0.01	7,618	0.02
Not stated	—	—	88,155	0.26
Total	31,841,374	~100	33,406,061	~100

=== Religious demographics of Travancore (1816–1941) ===
Religious Demographics of Travancore (1816–1941)
Census year	Hindus		Christians		Muslims		Total population
1816 – 1820	752,371	82.99%	112,158	12.37%	42,058	4.64%	906,587
1881	1,755,610	73.12%	498,542	20.76%	146,909	6.12%	2,401,158
1891	1,871,864	73.18%	526,911	20.60%	158,823	6.21%	2,557,736
1901	2,063,798	69.91%	697,387	23.62%	190,566	6.46%	2,952,157
1911	2,298,390	67.03%	903,868	26.36%	226,617	6.61%	3,428,975
1921	2,562,301	63.96%	1,172,934	29.27%	270,478	6.75%	4,006,062
1931	3,137,795	61.57%	1,604,475	31.46%	353,274	6.93%	5,095,973
1941	3,671,480	60.49%	1,963,808	32.35%	434,150	7.15%	6,070,018

=== Religious Demographics of Malabar District (1871–1951) ===
Religious Demographics of Malabar District (1871&1951)
Religion		1871	1951
1	Hinduism	72.43%	63.25%
2	Islam	25.72%	33.49%
3	Christianity	1.43%	3.24%

=== Communities ===
Caste/communities of Kerala (2011)
1. Mappila Muslims (16.7%)
2. Rowthers (9.92%)
3. Ezhavas (12.2%)
4. Thiyyar (10.4%)
5. Nairs (14.6%)
6. Syrian Christians (12.5%)
7. Scheduled Castes (9.80%)
8. Dheevaras (2.80%)
9. Roman Catholic Latin Rite (2.50%)
10. Brahmins (1.70%)
11. Scheduled Tribes (1.10%)
12. Other Christians (3.00%)
13. Other Hindu Castes (2.90%)
14. Others (0.30%)

==== SC and ST population in Kerala ====
The SC population of Kerala is 3,123,941 which is 9.80% of overall population. ST in Kerala, with a population of 364,000 constitute 1.14% of the population.

Denominations groups among Christians: (Note: Denominations are not considered as caste or ethnic groups. Caste groups among Christians, which is a continuation of casteism in Hinduism, runs parallel to denominational divisions. One caste group may be spread over many denominations. One denomination may have more than one caste group in it. A person belonging to a denomination can convert to another denomination.)

The Catholic Church (Syro-Malabar, Latin and Malankara Churches) is the largest denomination among Kerala Christians, among which the Syro-Malabar Eastern Catholic Church is the largest. Orthodox, Jacobite and Marthoma denominations claim Syrian roots. Major Protestant groups include CSI, and various Pentecostal churches. Chaldean Syrian, Seventh Day Adventists, Salvation Army are among some other denominations.

==== Tribal communities ====
Kerala has approximately 35 distinct scheduled tribes that constitute 1.3% of the population. Though entirely unique, their languages are often not highlighted as distinct in the census. The Paniyan, who are the numerically dominant tribe, live in north east of the state and practice settled cultivation. The Kattunaikan, Kurichian and Kuruman belong to the same region. Palleyan, Palliyan and Palliyar inhabit the Idukki region not far from the Anamalai and Palani hills of Tamil Nadu where you find the same population. The Kadar, Irular, Kurumbas, Maha malasar and Malasar inhabit the Palghat region close to their counterparts in Niligiri and Anamalai hills of Tamil Nadu. The same is the case of the Kudiya and Koraga living in the northern most tip of the state next to Kodagu and Dakshina Kannada region of Karnataka.

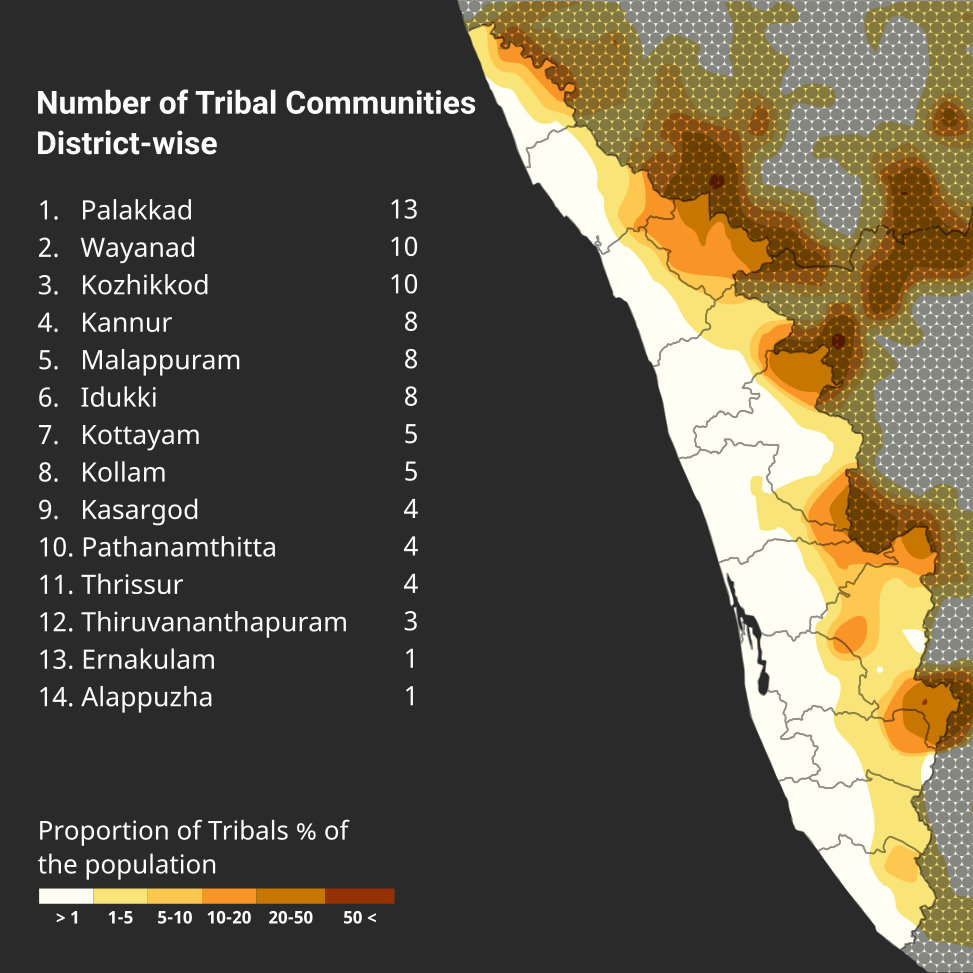
Total number of tribal communities

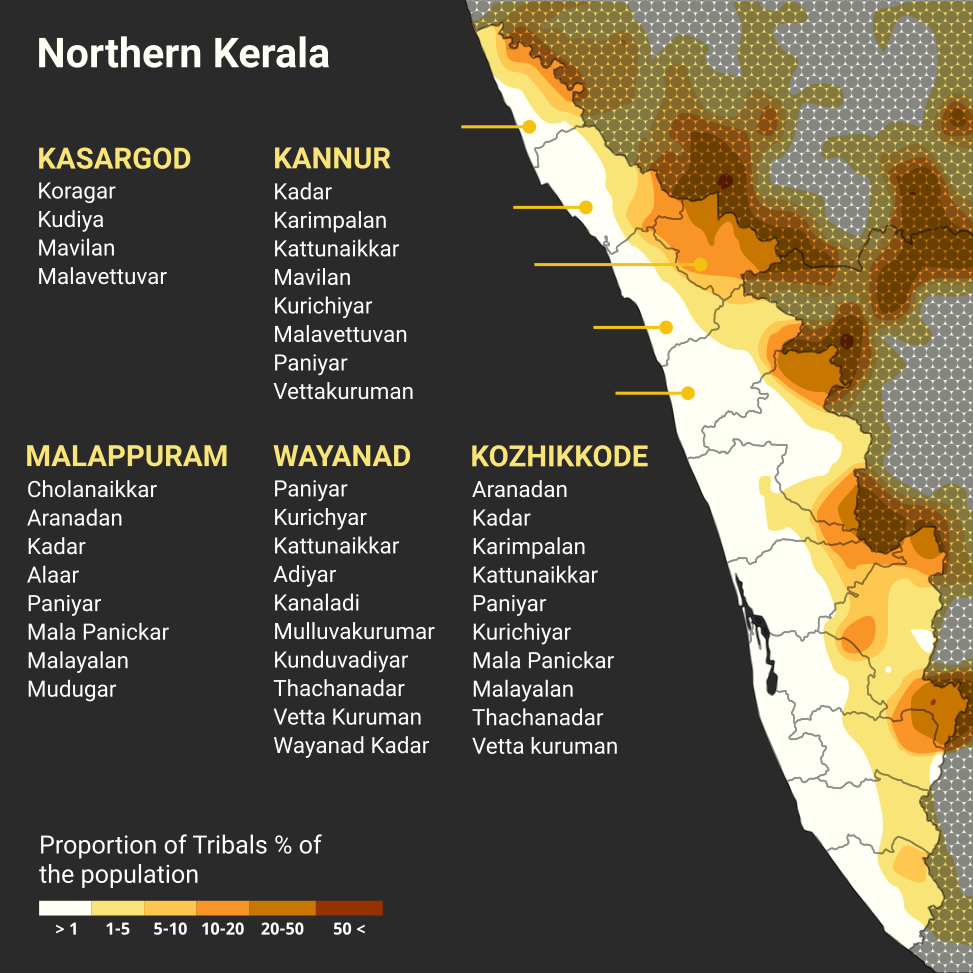
Tribes of North Kerala

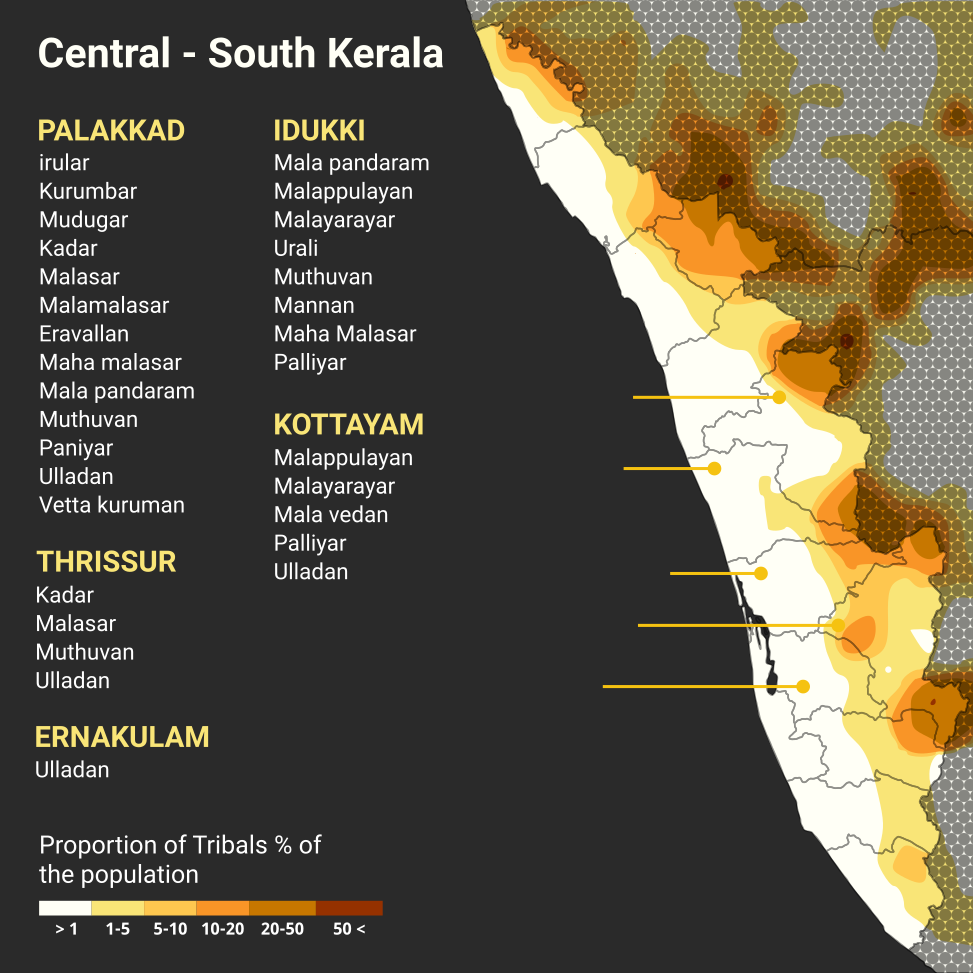
Tribes of Central-South Kerala

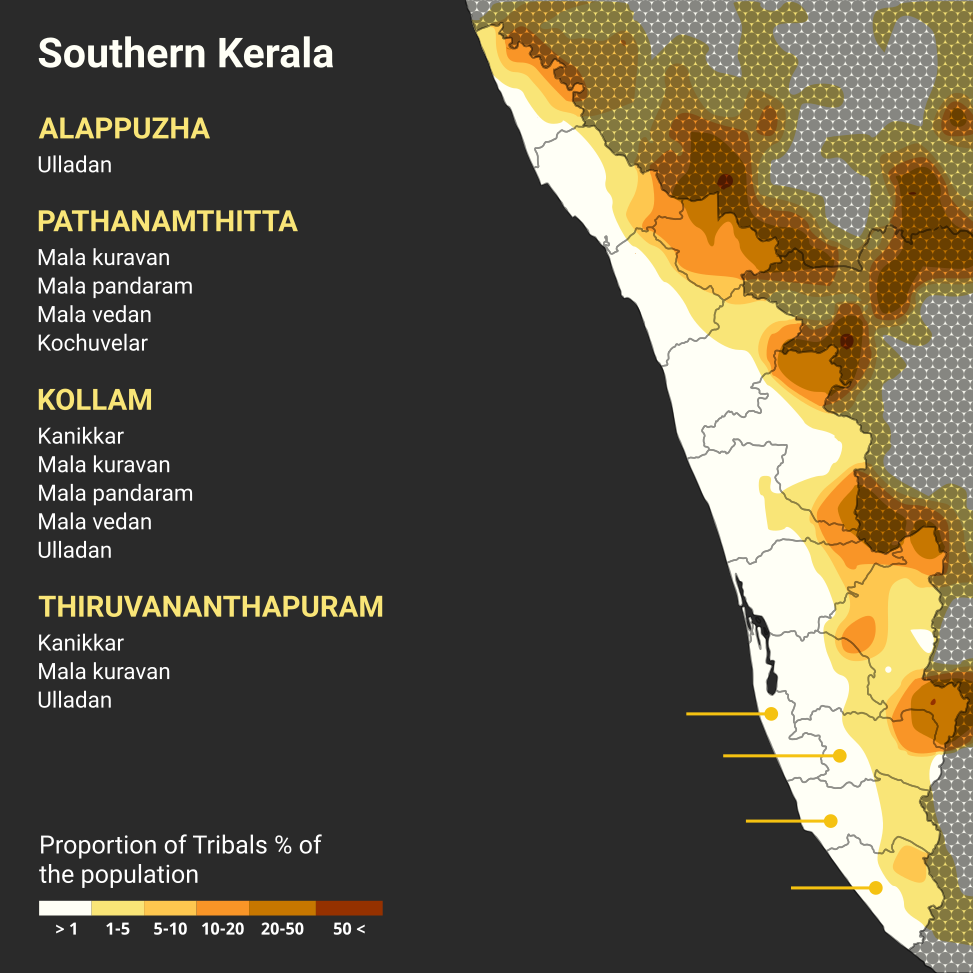
Tribes of South Kerala

=== Age structure ===
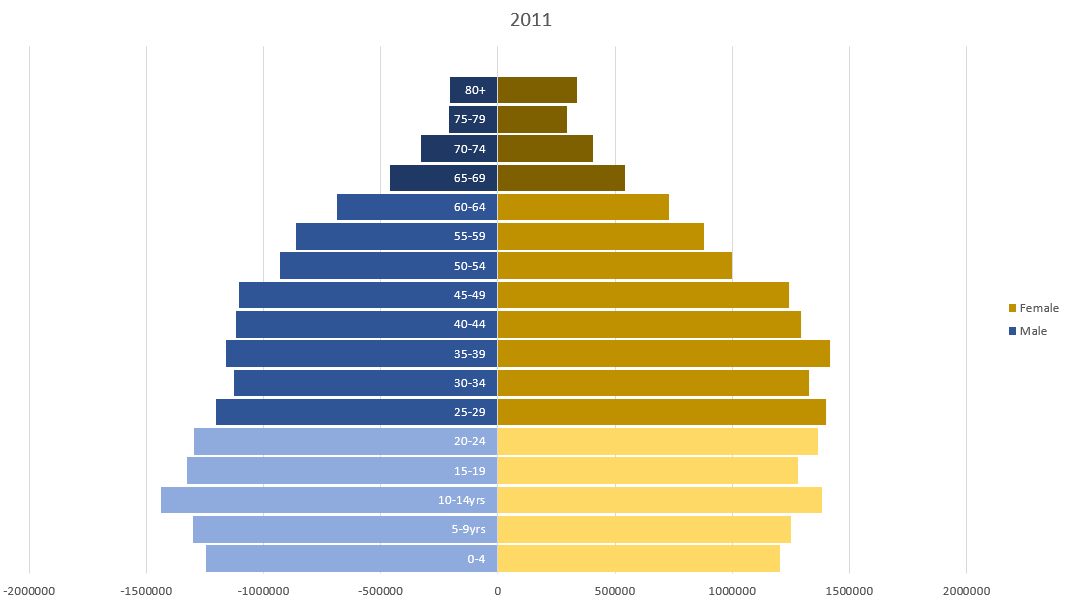
Population pyramid for Kerala as of 2011

(2011 census)

0–6 years: 9.95%
7–14 years: 23.9%
15–59 years: 54.3%
60 years and over:12.8%

Population by age (2011)
Age (Years):	Male population	Female population
0–4	1247534	1205558
5–9	1303190	1251922
10–14	1438917	1383853
15–19	1328299	1282253
20–24	1298826	1366983
25–29	1203978	1400114
30–34	1128217	1327284
35–39	1161819	1417854
40–44	1117424	1295074
45–49	1105598	1242932
50–54	931191	996954
55–59	861527	880881
60–64	685136	729535
65–69	459232	542902
70–74	326562	406810
75–79	208317	293050
80+	204348	337501

Median age
Year:	1961	1971	1981	1991	2001	2011
Age:	19.28	19.39	21.81	24.36	28.87	32

=== Urbanization ===
Urbanization Rate in Kerala
Year	Rural population (%)	Urban Population (%)
1961	84.9	15.11
1971	83.76	16.24
1981	81.26	18.74
1991	73.61	26.39
2001	74.04	25.96
2011	52.26	47.74

=== Birth rate ===
Year	Births	Deaths	Natural change	Birth rate	Death rate	N. change rate
1997	607,727	166,428	441,299	19.2	5.3	13.9
1998	591,508	185,788	405,720	18.4	5.8	12.6
1999	596,948	186,828	410,120	18.3	5.7	12.6
2000	593,724	178,795	414,929	18.0	5.4	12.6
2001	579,063	182,059	397,004	18.1	5.7	12.4
2002	581,925	184,597	397,328	18.0	5.7	12.3
2003	558,369	194,264	364,105	17.2	6.0	11.2
2004	563,153	199,017	364,136	17.1	6.1	11.0
2005	559,082	204,157	354,925	17.3	6.3	11.0
2006	556,326	219,094	337,232	16.6	6.6	10.0
2007	545,154	238,691	306,463	16.2	7.1	9.1
2008	535,738	221,769	313,969	15.7	6.5	9.2
2009	544,348	238,691	305,657	16.2	7.1	9.1
2010	546,964	238,864	308,100	15.8	6.9	8.9
2011	560,268	245,002	315,266	16.7	7.3	9.4
2012	550,411	239,982	310,429	16.4	7.1	9.3
2013	536,352	260,915	276,157	15.9	7.7	8.2
2014	534,458	248,242	286,216	15.8	7.3	8.5
2015	516,013	252,576	263,437	15.1	7.4	7.7
2016	496,292	256,130	240,162	14.5	7.5	7.0
2017	503,588	263,342	240,246	14.6	7.6	7.0
2018	488,174	258,530	229,644	14.1	7.5	6.6
2019	480,113	270,567	209,546	13.8	7.8	6.0
2020	446,891	250,983	195,908	12.8	7.2	5.6
2021	419,767	339,648	80,119	11.9	9.7	2.3
2022	443,032	323,929	119,103	12.5	9.2	3.4
2023	393,231	304,286	88,945	11.1	8.6	2.5
2024	344,766	313,553	31,213	9.6	8.8	0.8

- Source: Kerala Department of Economics and Statistics | Vital statistics

Birth data by religion

Percentage Distribution of Live Birth by Religion of the Family
Religion	2024	%	2023	%	2022	%	2021	%	2020	%	2019	%	2018	%	2017	%	2016	%	2015	%	2014	%	2013	%	2012	%	2011	%	2010	%	2009	%	2008	%	2007	%	2006	%	2005	%
Muslim	159,088	46.14%	176,312	44.84%	200,325	45.22%	169,296	40.33%	196,138	43.89%	212,933	44.35%	213,805	43.80%	216,525	43.00%	211,182	42.55%	213,865	41.45%	218,437	40.87%	214,257	39.96%	175,892	31.96%	214,099	38.21%	209,276	38.26%	204,711	37.61%	194,583	36.32%	183,796	33.71%	196,493	35.32%	191,675	34.28%
Hindu	136,163	39.49%	158,399	40.28%	177,037	39.96%	181,396	43.21%	185,411	41.49%	197,061	41.04%	203,158	41.61%	210,071	41.71%	207,831	41.88%	221,220	42.87%	231,031	43.23%	236,420	44.08%	214,591	38.99%	248,610	44.37%	246,297	45.03%	247,707	45.51%	241,305	45.04%	250,094	45.88%	258,119	46.40%	262,976	47.04%
Christian	48,476	14.06%	56,810	14.47%	64,168	14.48%	59,766	14.24%	62,265	13.93%	68,596	14.29%	69,844	14.31%	75,335	14.96%	76,205	15.35%	79,565	15.42%	83,616	15.65%	84,660	15.78%	102,546	18.63%	94,664	16.90%	88,936	16.26%	90,451	16.62%	94,175	17.58%	98,220	18.02%	96,469	17.34%	98,353	17.59%
Others	318	0.09%	1,294	0.33%	1,235	0.28%	9,143	2.18%	2,967	0.66%	1,408	0.29%	1,214	0.25%	1,497	0.30%	852	0.18%	933	0.18%	1,178	0.22%	869	0.16%	57,215	10.39%	2,671	0.48%	651	0.12%	704	0.13%	5,151	0.96%	6,108	1.12%	1,545	0.28%	1,098	0.19%
Not Stated	721	0.21%	416	0.11%	267	0.06%	166	0.04%	110	0.02%	115	0.02%	153	0.03%	169	0.03%	222	0.04%	430	0.08%	196	0.03%	146	0.02%	167	0.03%	224	0.04%	1,806	0.33%	775	0.14%	524	0.10%	6,936	1.27%	3,700	0.66%	4,980	0.89%
Total	344,766	100%	393,231	100%	443,032	100%	419,767	100%	446,891	100%	480,113	100%	488,174	100%	503,588	100%	496,292	100%	516,013	100%	534,458	100%	536,352	100%	550,411	100%	560,268	100%	546,964	100%	544,348	100%	535,738	100%	545,154	100%	556,326	100%	559,082	100%

17.1 births/1,000 population (1994–2001 est.)

Birth Rate was 17.1 in 1994–2001 (20.3 in 1984–1990 & 25.0 in 1974–1980). Pathanamthitta (14.5 in 1994–2001, 17.2 in 1984–1990 & NA in 1974–1980) had the lowest TBR and Malappuram(22.4, 29.5 & 33.6) had the highest TBR.

According to the 2011 Census, Thiruvalla taluk has the lowest birth rate and Tirurangadi taluk has the highest birth rate.

Lowest Birth Rate (2011):

1. Thiruvalla – 10.63 per 1,000
2. Mallappally – 10.69 per 1,000
3. Kozhenchery – 10.86 per 1,000
4. Chengannur – 10.93 per 1,000
5. Adoor – 11.09 per 1,000

Highest Birth Rate (2011):

1. Tirurangadi – 19.99 per 1,000
2. Ernad – 19.68 per 1,000
3. Perinthalmanna – 19.43 per 1,000
4. Tirur – 19.16 per 1,000
5. Nilambur – 18.34 per 1,000

Vital stats for the year 2011:

Community	Pop	Births	Birth Rate	Deaths	Death Rate	NGR%
Total	33,406,061	560,268	16.77	245,002	7.33	0.94%
Hindu	18,282,492	248,610	13.60	148,097	8.10	0.55%
Muslim	8,873,472	214,099	24.13	45,305	5.11	1.90%
Christian	6,141,269	94,664	15.41	50,365	8.20	0.72%

- In 2007, 61.55% of the deaths were reported from Hindus, 17.50% from Muslims and, 19.75% from Christians.
- In 2008, 61.01% of the deaths were reported from Hindus, 17.82% from Muslims and, 20.06% from Christians.
- In 2010, 60.79% of the deaths were reported from Hindus, 18.31% from Muslims and, 20.36% from Christians.
- In 2011, 60.45% of the deaths were reported from Hindus, 18.48% from Muslims and, 20.56% from Christians.
- In 2018, 60.54% of the deaths were reported from Hindus, 19.15% from Muslims and, 19.86% from Christians.

=== Net migration rate ===
(-)3.1 migrant(s)/1,000 population (1991 est.)

Of the emigrants from Kerala, 42.2% were Muslims, 36.6% were Hindus and 21.2% were Christians in 1992–93. The most preferred destination was Saudi Arabia (37.8%), followed by UAE (25.9%), Other Gulf countries (13.0%), Oman (11.8%), Other Countries (7.5%) and USA(3.8%).

=== Sex ratio ===
According to the 2011 census, women outnumber men in all the districts of Kerala with the highest proportion in Kannur and Pathanamthitta districts.

Districts	Population	Males	%	Females	%
Kasargod	1,307,375	628,613	48.1%	678,762	51.9%
Kannur	2,523,003	1,181,446	46.8%	1,341,557	53.2%
Wayanad	817,420	401,684	49.1%	415,736	50.9%
Kozhikode	3,086,293	1,470,942	47.7%	1,615,351	52.3%
Malappuram	4,112,920	1,960,328	47.7%	2,152,592	52.3%
Palakkad	2,809,934	1,359,478	48.4%	1,450,456	51.6%
Thrissur	3,121,200	1,480,763	47.4%	1,640,437	52.6%
Ernakulam	3,282,388	1,619,557	49.3%	1,662,831	50.7%
Idukki	1,108,974	552,808	49.8%	556,166	50.2%
Kottayam	1,974,551	968,289	49%	1,006,262	51%
Alappuzha	2,127,789	1,013,142	47.6%	1,114,647	52.4%
Pathanamthitta	1,197,412	561,716	46.8%	635,696	53.2%
Kollam	2,635,375	1,246,968	47.3%	1,388,407	52.7%
Thiruvananthapuram	3,301,427	1,581,678	47.9%	1,719,749	52.1%

=== Vital statistics ===
Year	Infant Mortality Rate (per 1000 birth)	Crude Birth Rate (per 100)	Crude Death Rate (per 1000)	Natural Growth Rate (per 1000)	Maternal Mortality Rate (Maternal death/ 100000 live birth)	Total Fertility Rate (Birth/Woman)
2000	14	17.9	6.4	11.5		1.7
2001	11	17.3	6.6	10.7		1.8
2002	10	16.9	6.4	10.5		1.8
2003	11	16.7	6.3	10.4		1.8
2004	12	15.2	6.1	9.1	95	1.7
2005	14	15.0	6.4	8.6		1.7
2006	15	14.9	6.7	8.2		1.7
2007	13	14.7	6.8	7.9	81	1.7
2008	12	14.6	6.6	8.0		1.7
2009	12	14.7	6.8	7.9		1.7
2010	13	14.8	7.0	7.8	66	1.7
2011	12	15.2	7.0	8.2	61	1.7
2012	12	14.9	6.9	8.0		1.7
2013	12	14.7	6.9	7.8		1.6
2014	12	14.8	6.6	8.2	46	1.6
2015	12	14.8	6.6	8.2	42	1.6
2016	10	14.3	7.6	6.7		1.7
2017	10	14.2	6.8	7.4		1.7
2018	7	13.9	6.9	7.0	31 (est)	1.8

=== Life expectancy at birth ===
Life expectancy at birth is 78 years.

In 1991, Kerala had the lowest TFR (Children born per women) in the whole of India. Hindus had a TFR of 1.66, Christians had 1.78 and Muslims had 2.97. In 2000, the TFR was 1.73 with Muslims having 2.28, Nairs having a TFR of 1.47 and Syrian Christians having TFR of 1.55. TFR for Scheduled Castes was 1.52 in 1997–98 and 1.37 in 1992–93. The lowest Fertility rate recorded anywhere in India is TFR of 1.17 for Vettuvan caste in Kerala.

As per the 2011 Census, the fertility rate per community is as Hindu: 1.544 children per woman, Muslim: 2.351 and Christian: 1.716. For SC, the fertility is 1.485 and for ST, it is 1.629.

For Hindus, the TFR is highest in Wayanad (1.710) and lowest in Thiruvananthapuram (1.435). For the Muslims, it is Kannur (2.779) and Pathanamthitta (1.707), while for the Christians the respective districts are Kasaragod (1.929) and Kollam (1.539).

== See also ==
- Non-Municipal Census Towns in Kerala
- Demographics of Malabar
- Demographics of Travancore
- History of Kerala
- Geography of Kerala
- Economy of Kerala
- Kerala Gulf diaspora
- Migrant labourers in Kerala
- Unemployment in Kerala
