= Tribals in Kerala =

Indigenous populations

A tribal school in Nilambur (north Kerala)

Tribals in Kerala (known in Malayalam as the Adivasi) are the tribal population found in the Indian state of Kerala. Most of the tribals of Kerala live in the forests and mountains of Western Ghats, bordering Karnataka and Tamil Nadu.

Tribals in Kerala are officially designated as "Scheduled Tribes" for affirmative action purposes. Kerala Public Service Commission, Government of Kerala, lists thirty-seven of Scheduled Tribes in Kerala. Tribals in Kerala are classified by Scheduled Tribes Development Department, Government of Kerala into three sub-sets (Particularly Vulnerable, Marginalised and Minorities).

According to the 2011 Census of India, the Scheduled Tribe population in Kerala is 484.839 (1.5 % of the total population). Wayanad district has the highest number of tribals (1,51,443) in Kerala, followed by Idukki (55,815), Palakkad (48,972) and Kasaragod (48,857) and Kannur districts (41,371). Paniyar, Irular, Kattunaikan, Oorali and Adiyar are some of the major "communities" among Kerala tribals.

O. R. Kelu, Member of the Legislative Assembly from Mananthavady, is the current Kerala Minister for Welfare of Scheduled Castes, Scheduled Tribes and Backward Classes.

The Department of Scheduled Tribes Development is responsible for the development and welfare of ST communities in Kerala.

== Tribal population (2011) ==
S No	Tribe	Population
	Adiyan	11,526
	Arandan, Aranadan	283
	Eravallan	4,797
	Hill Pulaya, Mala Pulaya, Kurumba Pulayan, Pamba Pulayan	2,959
	Irular, Irula	23,721
	Kadar, Wayanad Kadar	2,949
	Kanikaran, Kanikkar	21,251
	Kattunayakan	18,199
	Kochuvelan	38
	Koraga	1,582
	Kudiya, Melakudi	785
	Kurichchan, Kurichiyan	35,171
	Kurumans, Mullu Kurumans, Mala Kurumans	18,199
	Maha Malasar	154
	Malayarayan, Malaiayaran	33,216
	Malai Pandaram	2,422
	Malai Vedan	8,149
	Malakkuruvan	175
	Malasar	3,195
	Malayan, Nattu Malayan (excluding the areas comprising the Kasaragod, Kannur, Wayanad and Kozhikode districts)	5,917
	Malayarayar	1,568
	Mannan (to be spelt in Malayalam script in parentheses)	9,780
	Muthuvan, Mudugar, Muduvan	349
	Palleyan, Palliyan, Paliyar, Palliya	1,464
	Paniyan	88,450
	Ulladan, Ullatan	16,230
	Uraly	11,179
	Malavettuvan	17,869
	Tenu Kurumba, Jenu Kurumba	25
	Thachanadan, Thachanandan Moopan	1,745
	Cholanaikkan	124
	Mavilan	30,867
	Karimpalan	14,098
	Vettakuruman	739
	Mala Panickar	1,023
		484,839

== Distribution by district ==
Source: 2011 census
District	Scheduled Tribe population (2011)	%
Kasaragod	48857	3.8
Kannur	41371	1.6
Wayanad	151443	18.5
Kozhikode	15228	0.5
Malappuram	22990	0.6
Palakkad	48972	1.7
Thrissur	9430	0.3
Ernakulam	16559	0.5
Idukki	55815	5.0
Kottayam	21972	1.1
Alappuzha	6574	0.3
Pathanamthitta	8108	0.7
Kollam	10761	0.4
Thiruvananthapuram	26759	0.8
Kerala	484839	1.5

== List of Scheduled Tribes in Kerala ==
- As amended by the Scheduled Castes and Scheduled Tribes Order (Amendment Act) 1976.
- As amended by the Indian Constitution (Scheduled Castes) Orders (Second Amendment) Act, 2002 (Act 61 of 2002) vide Part VIII - Kerala - Schedule I notified in the Gazette of India, dated 18 December, 2002.
- As amended by the Scheduled Castes and Scheduled Tribes Orders (Amendment) Act, 2002 (Act 10 of 2003) vide Part VII - Kerala - Schedule II notified in the Gazette of India, dated 08 January, 2003.

Kerala Public Service Commission	Scheduled Tribe Development Department (Government of Kerala)	REPORT ON THE SOCIO ECONOMIC STATUS (2013)
Adiyan	Adiyan	Adiyan
Aranda; Arandan	Aranadan; Aranadan	Arandan; Aranadan
Eravallan	Ervallan	Eravallan
Hill Pulaya; Mala Pulayan; Kurumba Pulayan; Karavazhi Pulayan; Pamba Pulayan	Hill Pulaya; Mala Pulayan; Kurumba Pulayan; Karavazhi Pulayan; Pamba Pulayan	Hill Pulaya; Mala Pulayan; Kurumba Pulayan; Karavazhi Pulayan; Pamba Pulaya
Irular; Irulan	Irular; Irulan	Irular; Irulan
Kadar; Wayanad Kadar	Kadar; Wayanad Kadar	Kadar; Wayanad Kadar
Kanikkaran; Kanikar	Kanikaran; Kanikkar	Kanikaran; Kanikkar
Karimpalan	Karimpalan	Karimpalan
Kattunayakan	Kattunayakan	Kattunayakan
Kochuvelan	Kochuvelan	Kochuvelan
Koraga	Koraga	Koraga
Kudiya; Melakudi	Kudiya; Melakudi	Kudiya Melakudi
Kurichchan; Kurichiyan	Kurichchan; Kurichiyan	Kurichchan; Kurichiyan
Kurumans; Mullu Kuruman; Mulla Kuruman; Mala Kuruman	Kurumans; Mullu Kuruman	Kurumans; Mullu Kuruman
Kurumbas; Kurumbar; Kurumban	Kurumbas; Kurumbar; Kurumban	Kurumbas; Kurumbar; Kurumban
Mahamalasar	Maha Malasar	Maha Malasar
Malai Arayan; Mala Arayan	Malai Arayan; Mala Arayan	Malai Arayan; Mala Arayan
Malai Pandaran	Malai Pandaram	Malai Pandaram
Malai Vedan; Mala Vedan	Malai Vedan; Malavedan	Malai Vedan Malavedan
Malakkuravan	Malakkuravan	Malakkuravan
Malasar	Malasar	Malasar
Malayan; Nattu Malayan; Konga Malayan; Excluding the areas comprising the Kasaragod, Kannur, Wayanad and Kozhikode districts)	Malayan; Nattu Malayan; Konga Malayan; Excluding the areas comprising the Kasargode, Cannanore, Wayanad and Kozhikode districts	Malayan; Nattu Malayan; Konga Malayan; Excluding the areas comprising the Kasaragod, Kannur, Wayanad and Kozhikode districts
Mavilan	Mavilan	Mavilan
Malayarayar	Malayarayar	Malayarayar
Mannan (to be spelt in Malayalam script in parentheses)	Mannan (to be spelt in Malayalam script in parentheses)	Mannan (to be spelt in Malayalam script in parentheses)
Muthuvan; Mudugar; Muduvan	Muthuvan; Mudugar; Muduvan	Muthuvan, Mudugar, Muduvan
Palleyan; Palliyan; Paliyar; Palliya	Palleyan; Palliyan; Palliyar; Palliyan	Palleyan; Palliyan; Palliyar; Paliyan
Paniyan	Paniyan	Paniyan
Ulladan; Ullatan	Ulladan; Ullatan	Ulladan; Ullatan
Uraly	Uraly	Uraly
Mala Vettuvan (in Kasaragod and Kannur districts)	Mala Vettuvan (in Kasargode and Kannur districts)	Mala Vettuvan (in Kasaragod and kannur Districts)
Ten Kurumban; Jenu Kurumban	Ten Kurumban; Jenu Kurumban	Ten Kurumban; Jenu Kurumban
Thachenadan; Thachenadan; Moopan	Thachanadan; Thachanadan Moopan	Thachanadan; Thachanadan Moopan
Cholanaickan	Cholanaickan	Cholanaickan
Malapanickar	Mala Panickar	Mala Panickar
Vettakuruman	Vetta Kuruman	Vetta Kuruman
	Marati (of the Housdrug and Kasargode taluk of Kasargode district)	

== Scheduled Tribes list for educational concession ==
Source: http://www.stdd.kerala.gov.in/scheduled-tribes-kerala

1. Allar (Aalan)
2. Layan (Konga Malayan, Malayan, Panimalayan)
3. ... (in the areas of Malabar only)
4. Malavettuvan
5. Malamuthuvan
6. Kunduvadiyan
7. Pathiyan
8. Thachanadan Mooppan
9. Wayanad Kadar
10. Lalanadi
11. Chingathan
12. Malayar
13. Malapanicker
14. Irivandavan
