= Nanjiyamma =

Indian folksinger

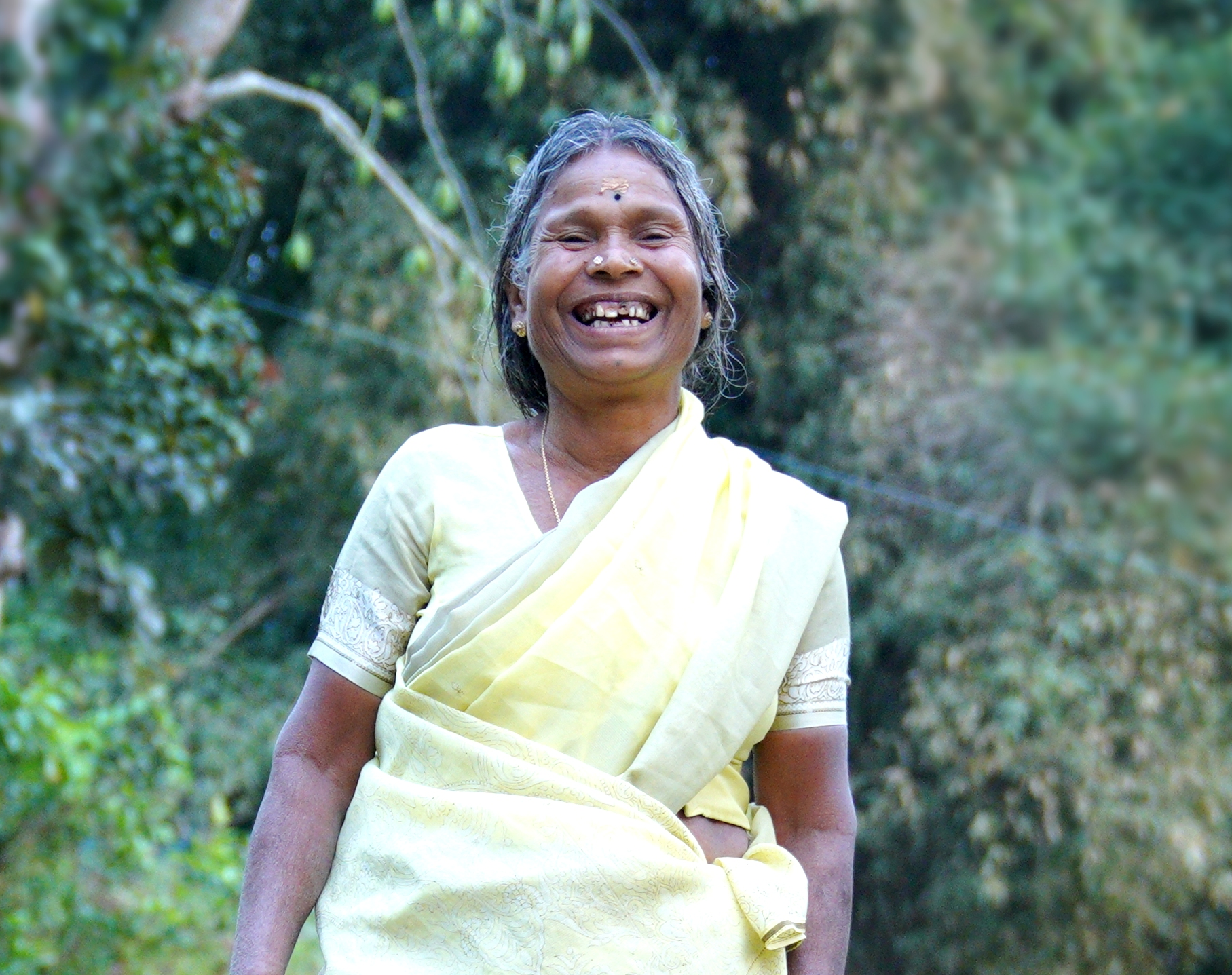
- Nanjiyamama in 2020
- Born: Attappadi, Palakkad, Kerala, India
- Citizenship: Indian
- Occupations: Folksinger; Playback Singer; Farmer
- Years active: 2020 - Present
- Notable work: "Kalakkatha" song from the movie Ayyappanum Koshiyum
- Awards: National Film Award for Best Female Playback Singer Kerala State Film Awards (Special Jury Award)

Nanjiyamma is a national award winner female playback singer who hails from a tribal community in Kerala. She garnered public attention after singing playback in the Malayalam film Ayyappanum Koshiyum in 2020. The film's title song "Kalakkatha" written by herself in Irula language and composed by Jakes Bejoy attained popularity after its release on YouTube. The song received more than 10 million views in a month.

== Early life and career ==
She hails from an Irula community in Nakkupathi, a tribal village in Attappadi in Palakkad district, Kerala, India.

Nanjiyamma is a folksinger of the Azad Kala Samithi, led by Pazhani Swami, a tribal artist in Attappadi. Later in 2020, she was introduced into playback singing through the film Ayyappanum Koshiyum. She has also played the role of mother-in-law to the protagonist Biju Menon in the film. She finds a livelihood by farming and feeding cattle. She sings mostly folk songs that went past through generations. She first sung for a documentary for Mathrumozhi titled Aggedu Nayaga directed by Sindhu Sajan. Nanjiyamma sung the promotional song for Government of Kerala's housing programme Life Mission and it was the first time Irula language was used for a public relations program in Kerala.

Nanjiyamma was awarded the National Film Award for Best Female Playback Singer in the 68th National Film Awards of India for the song "Kalakkatha" song from the movie Ayyappanum Koshiyum. She received special Jury Award of Kerala State Film Award in 2020.

== Discography ==
Year	Film	Song(s)	Composer
2024	Mayavanam	"Kadanamma (Promo song)"	Dr. Jagath lal
2022	Ulkkanal	"Ele Le Le (Tribal Song)", Lyrics also	
2022	Signature	"Attappadi song"	
2022	Chekkan	"Athukku Antha"	
2022	EMI	"Thena Koyyana"	
2022	Station 5	"Dakka Dakka"	
2020	Ayyappanum Koshiyum	"Adakachakko (Promo Song)"	Jakes Bejoy
2020	Ayyappanum Koshiyum	"Kalakkatha", Lyrics also	Jakes Bejoy
2020	Ayyappanum Koshiyum	"Thaalam Poyi"	Jakes Bejoy
2015	Velutha Rathrikal	"Hey Vannathi "	
2015	Velutha Rathrikal	"Mallike"	
2015	Velutha Rathrikal	"Muttolam Mundudutha"	
2015	Velutha Rathrikal	"Hey Karadi"	
2015	Aggedu Nayaga	"Kakke Daage"	Manakkala Goopalakrishanan
2015	Aggedu Nayaga	"Kelaye daage gogunthee"	Manakkala Goopalakrishanan
2015	Aggedu Nayaga	"Akkare vantha pachakkiliye"	Manakkala Goopalakrishanan
2015	Aggedu Nayaga	"Le le le karadi"	Manakkala Goopalakrishanan

== Filmography ==
Year	Title	Role	Notes
2020	Ayyappanum Koshiyum	Kannamma's Mother	Uncredited role
2020	Chunkan	Nanjiamma	Musical video
2020	The Prince of Mollywood Prithviraj	Nanjiamma	Musical video also singer
2021	Payanam	Herself	Musical video
2022	Chekkan	Muthassi	
2022	EMI	Singer	
2022	Signature		
2022	Ullkkanal		
2022	Guardian Angel		
2024	Mayavanam	Singer	Movie song
2025	Am Ah		

=== Television ===
Show	Network	Notes
Bumper Chiri Aghosham	Mazhavil Manorama	
Naattupattu	Janam TV	
Parayam Nedam	Kaumudy	Participant
Salt and Pepper	Kaumudy	Presenter
Ruchiyathra	Surya TV	Presenter
Madhura Pathinettil Prithvi	Surya TV	Guest
Karthika Deepam	Zee Keralam	Special appearance Singer for title song
Nanjiyamma's Tribal Village Food	Umami@Kerala (YouTube Channel)	Guest
