= Kambara dance =

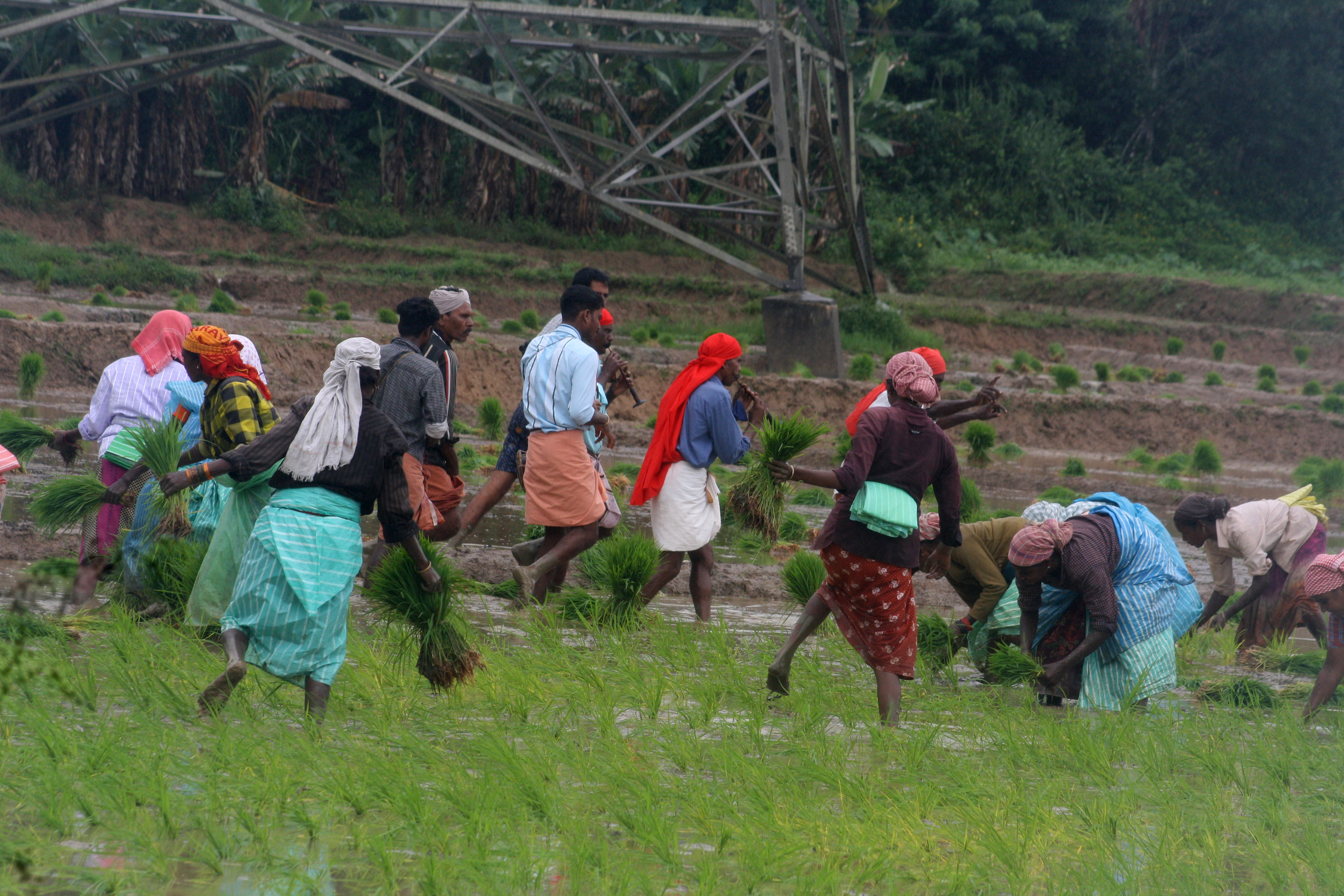
Kamabala Natti (planting of saplings in a paddy, accompanied by music and dance performances) performed at Pulikkal Vayal in Mananthavady Municipality, 2017

The Kambara nritham or Kambara dance is a folk dance performed by the Adiyan tribe of Wayanad, a northern district of the state of Kerala. In this artform, men sing folk songs and play wind and percussion instruments, while women dance near the paddies where saplings are collected.

== See also ==
- Folk dance in India
