= Irula Nritham =

Traditional tribal dance of the Irula community

- Native name: ഇരുള നൃത്തം (Malayalam)
- Genre: Tribal dance
- Instrument(s): kogal, perai, davil and other traditional tribal percussion instruments
- Inventor: Irula community
- Origin: Attappadi

Irula Nritham (also known as Irular Nritham) is a traditional tribal dance form performed by the Irula community of southern India, particularly in the Attappadi region of Palakkad district in Kerala.

== Overview ==
The dance is closely associated with the cultural traditions of the Irula tribe and is performed during important social and ritual occasions. It has historically been performed during life events such as marriages, harvest celebrations and funeral rites within the community, festivals and other communal gatherings.

The dance is performed during rituals of Malleeswara (Shiva).

== Components ==
Traditional tribal attire is worn during the dance. Instruments used in the dance include kogal or kokal (wind instrument), perai or porey (earthern pot), and davil or jaala, which provide the rhythmic accompaniment for the performance. Songs performed during Irula Nritham often incorporate a mixture of regional languages and dialects of Kannada, Malayalam, Tamil and Tulu.

== Modern recognition ==
In recent years, Irula Nritham has gained wider recognition through its inclusion in the Kerala State School Arts Festival (Kalolsavam) in 2024. The dance was introduced as part of new tribal art categories intended to promote indigenous cultural traditions among students. Community organisations such as the Attappadi Community Theatre have also mentored several student teams performing Irula Nritham at the festival.

== See also ==
- Gadhika
- Pazhani Swami, Irula Nritham performer
