= Pazhani Swami =

Indian dancer

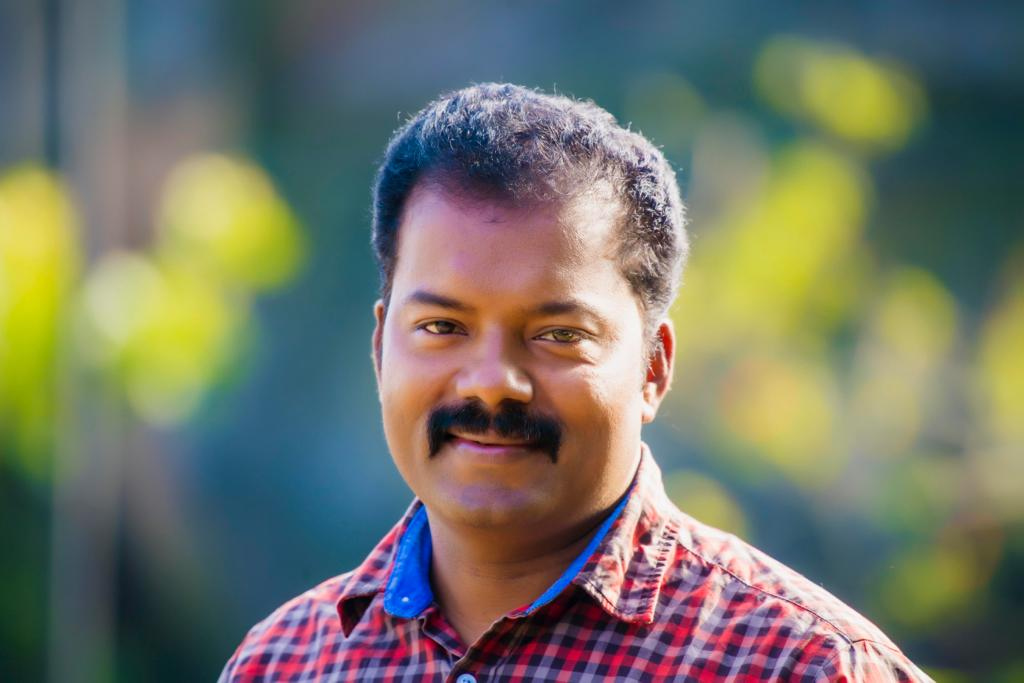
- Born: 14 February 1979 (age 47) of Attappadi, Palakkad District, Kerala, India
- Occupations: Irula dance master, actor, officer in kerala forest and wildlife department
- Spouse: Shobha
- Children: Anu Prashobhini, Adithyan
- Parent(s): Subramanyan; Kuppa

Pazhani Swami is one of the master performers in Irula dance of Irula tribal community and an actor in Malayalam movie industry. He is the leader of Azad Kala Sangham, a prominent troupe from Attappadi which performs Irula dance of tribal community of Kerala. One of this troupe member Nanjiyamma’s song 'Kalakkatha' in Malayalam movie Ayyappanum Koshiyum gone viral.

== Awards and Recognitions ==
Pazhani Swami is a popular Irula dance artist. He was honored by P. K. Jayalakshmi the Minister for Welfare of Backward Communities in the state Government of Kerala at the National Tribal Fest held at Valliyurkavu Mananthavady of Wayanad on 2012. He received the 'Young Pratibha Folklore Award' by the Kerala Folklore Academy on 2015. He gets the Kerala Chief Minister's 'Distinguished Service Award' in 2018 as a worker in the Kerala Forest and Wildlife Department. Azad Kala Sangham is performing the Irula dance in various cities of India like Mumbai and Delhi.

== Filmography ==
No.	Year	Title	Language	Role	Director
1	2009	Pazhassi Raja	Malayalam	Kurichiya Soldier	Hariharan
2	2009	Bhagyadevatha	Malayalam	Small Role	Sathyan Anthikad
3	2013	Poombattakalude Thazhvaram	Malayalam	Muthu	V.M. Akhilesh
4	2020	Ayyappanum Koshiyum	Malayalam	Excise Assistant Sub-Inspector Faisal	Sachy

== Personal life ==
He is from the Irula community and lives in Choriyannoor tribal village in Attappadi of Palakkad district with his wife Shobha and two children, Anu Prashobhini and Adithyan. He is an officer in Kerala Forest and Wildlife Department at Mannarghat division of Palghat district.
