= Gadhika =

Indian folk dance

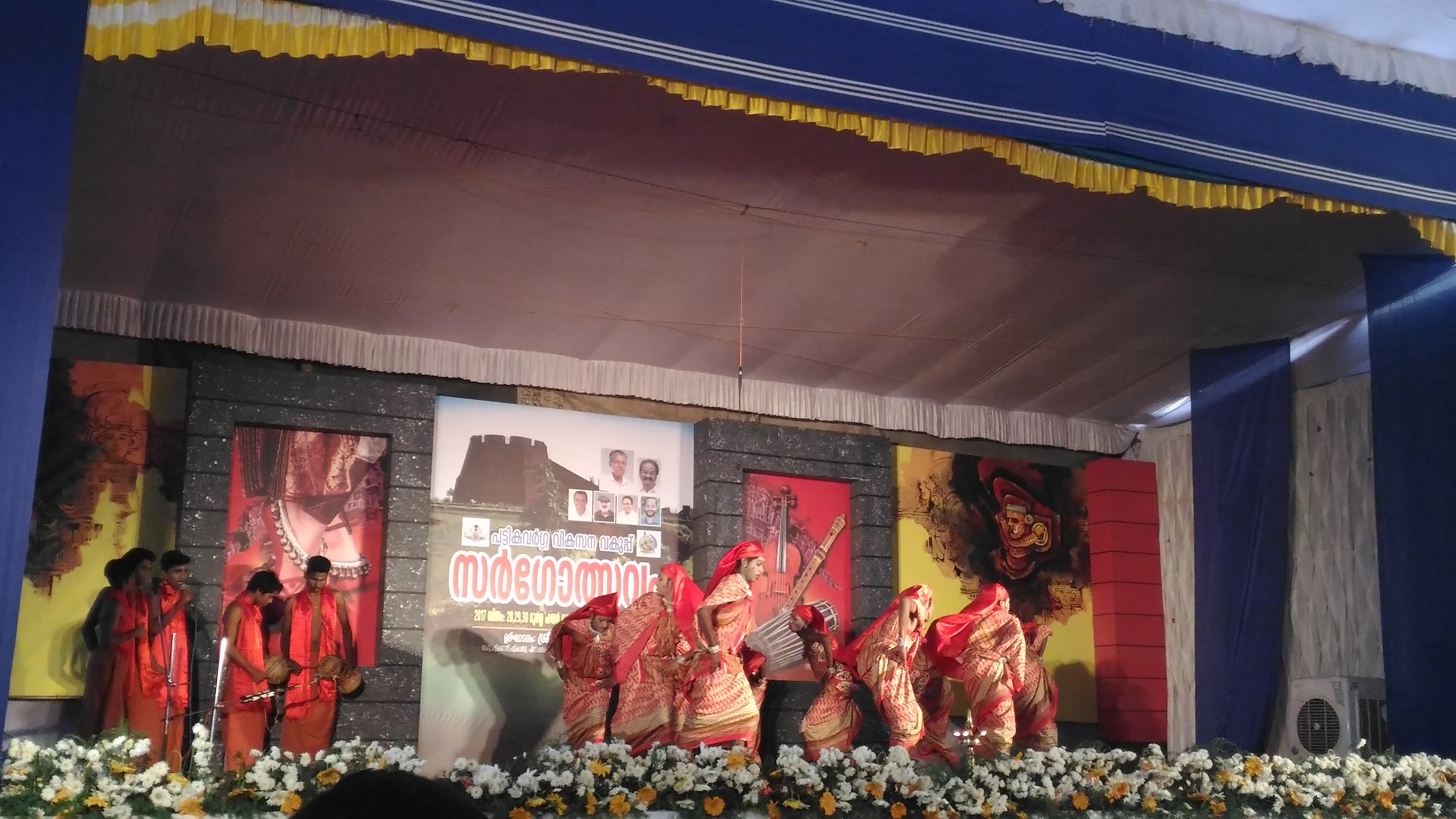
- Gadhika performance
- Native name: ഗദ്ദിക (Malayalam)
- Genre: Ritual
- Origin: Kerala, India

Gadhika also spelled as Gaddika is a tribal art form of the Adiya or Adiyor tribe belonging to the Scheduled Tribes of Wayanad district, Kerala, India. Gaddika is a ritual art form performed to cure disease and ward off miseries and evil eye. There are two variations of Gadhika, Nattu Gadhika, a public performance and Pooja Gadhika, which is purely ritualistic.

== Overview ==
Atiyor are one of the major tribal groups living in villages like Achukunnu, Kuppathote, Payyampally and Thrissileri in Wayanad district. They believe that sickness and suffering are caused by God's wrath. There are many customs and rituals practiced among the Adiyas who believe in witchcraft. Gaddika is a magical ritual performed by Adiyrs to cure disease and ward off miseries and evil eyes. Gaddika is also performed for the removal of ghosts affecting the locals and household members. Ceremonies are conducted under the leadership of the chief priest called Gaddikakaran. It is also believed that this is a ritual that heralds the arrival of goodness.

== Types ==
There are two variations of Gadhika, Nattu Gadhika and Pooja Gadhika. Pooja Gadhika is purely ritualistic, performed to cure disease, ward off miseries and evil eye, and safe delivery of child.

There is also a custom of gaddika groups going around the country accompanied by musical instruments, known as Nattu Gadhika. Nattu Gadhika performed annually for the good of the country, lasts for seven days. People will tell their sufferings to the gadhikakaran, and he will bless them.

== Ritual ==
Gaddika is usually held once a year, during the Malayalam month of Mithunam (June/July). Gaddika ritual needs rice, coconut and Finger millet. These ceremonies were started by placing a muram (a traditional kitchen tool made with palm leaves), placing a long bamboo cane near to it and offering money. There is also a ritual of seeking permission from Lord Shiva to perform Gadhika.

During the gaddika, the Adiyor sing the praises of each of their gods. Such songs are in praise of deities like Chuvani, Siddappan and Malakari. While singing the song, the gaddikakaran dance in high energy. The language used throughout the ritual is a mixture of Kannada and Tulu languages.

== Non-ritual ==
It was under the leadership of P.K. Kalan, Adiyor's Mooppan (Tribal chief) and politician, that Gaddika, which was performed only as a part of ritual, was presented in public platforms inside and outside Kerala without losing its artistic values. Along with PK Kalan, P K Karian was another artist who used this tribal art as a tool for social reform.

== In popular culture ==
The tribal art fair organized by the Department of Scheduled Tribes Development, Kerala state is named 'Gadhika'. The government organizes two fairs every year at different places in Kerala.
