= Cheruman =

Dalit community of Kerala

Cheruman are a Dalit community in Indian state of Kerala, primarily concentrated in Central and Northern region of the state. They have been defined as agricultural serfs and were considered as untouchable caste. They are related to the Pulaya caste of Kerala and are recognized as separate community by Government of India. Subcastes of Cheruman include Era, Erakanakka, Illivalluva, Irumba, Kula, Kuta, Malan, Mola, Pulakanaka, Pulavalluva, Rola, and Vethuri.

== Demographics ==
The community is present in Kerala and Tamil Nadu, particularly in the districts of Palakkad, Malappuram and Kozhikode. They are second largest Scheduled Caste community in Kerala, after Pulaya making up around 10.4% of total state's scheduled castes population and have small population in Tamil Nadu in Nilgiris and Coimbatore.

| SC Code | State | Population | Source |
|---|---|---|---|
| 014 | Kerala | 3,17,218 | |
| 016 | Tamil Nadu | 1,449 | |

== Reservation ==
The Government of India recognized Cheruman as a Scheduled Caste as per part of affirmative action policy.
