= Kanakkan =

Ethnic group found in Tamil Nadu, South India

Kanakkan are an ethnic group in the Indian state Kerala. They are also known as Padanna or Padannan. They are recognized under Scheduled Castes in Kerala and Other Backward Classes in Tamil Nadu, except in Nilgiris district (where they are Scheduled Castes).

They are an endogamous community bought to the Cochin State for administration and maintaining temple revenue records. During the Chola dynasty, the members of community settled in the neighbouring regions. They were known for maintenance of accounts and records of temples and were given the title of Kanakkapillai (meaning "Accountant" in Tamil), which later shortened to Kanakkan.

As of 2011 census, the population of the community in Kerala was 2,45,593 and were the biggest scheduled caste community in Malappuram district.
