= Ninabali =

Indian folk dance

- Native name: നിണബലി (Malayalam)
- Genre: Ritual
- Instrument(s): Chenda, Elathalam
- Origin: Kerala, India

Ninabali is a ritualistic performing art form popular in Kannur, Kozhikode districts of northern Kerala, India. It is a folk art performed by the Malaya community. This art form, which is performed in homes as part of Hinuist exorcism ceremonies, depicts the battle between Bhadrakali and the asura Darika.

== Overview ==
This folk art form is mainly popular in Kannur district and Kozhikode districts in North Kerala. This art form, which is performed in homes as part of Hinuist exorcism ceremonies, depicts the battle between Hindu goddess Bhadrakali and the asura Darika. It is a folk art performed by the Malaya community in Kerala. People used to sponsor this ritual dance for exorcism and promote fertility. It is also performed by Panar community in Kerala. The ceremony of slaughtering a chicken and sprinkling its blood is also performed as part of this.

== Ceremony ==
A decorated Pandal is made in the cleared yard. Branches of Indian Devil tree (Alstonia scholaris) and Strychnine tree and a bunch of banana are tied to the pilIer of the pandal. Poha (rice), Puffed rice, jaggery, tender coconut, honey, liquor, coconut etc. are placed on the banana leaf. In front of the house, the ceremony called thukaluzhichil begins. Its specialty is the song sung by the Malaya women in the background of traditional instruments like chenda, aripara and elathalam. After the day-long thukaluzhichil, Ninabali starts in the evening.

Actors, dancers and singers bow down facing the stage. This ceremony is known as Guru Puja (literally means worshipping the master). It is announced that there is a Ninabali ceremony, accompanied by musical instruments. Chenda, Aripara and Elathalam are used for this. At this time popcorn starts to be applied on Darikan's body smeared with Ninam (Red liquid made by mixing turmeric and lime, which represents blood).

In the background music of Chenda, holding the curtain in front of him and with people on both sides, Darikan enters the scene with a shout. Darikan's monstrous appearance in the dim light of the nilavilakku will strike fear into the onlookers. As soon as the sound of the chenda and elathalam stops, Darikan enters the ninabali area with special movements after changing the curtain. Darikan begins the puja after gazing in all directions with the fire in his hand. Again the instrument music starts and when it reaches its peak, Darikan rushes through the front door to the house where the ceremony is being held, and returns angrily to the scene and after making some steps and mudras, begins the puja again. Darikan calls Kali to battle through the mudras by making his steps in each direction and showing the mudras in a manner reminiscent of the steps of Kalarippayattu. Darikan's entry ends in an hour.

Then Kali comes on the scene. The instrument used at this time is only Veekkan Chenda (a modification of Chenda). Kali rushes to house and returns to the Ninabali scene after saluting the clan deity inside the house, showing steps and mudras. Darikan reappears as Kali goes.

As Darikan shouts, Kali jumps from the audience with a sword. Seeing Kali, the Asura steps bravely. Then Kali and Darikan start fighting and after some time Darikan hides in a small space made of banana stem. Searching for the Asura in all directions, Kali finally finds Darika and starts the battle again. A frightened Darikan runs out of the field, followed by Kali. After this ceremony which is known as 'Panjupidutam', Kali symbolically kills Darika and drinks his blood.

Usually, the Ninabali ceremony ends here. In the past, there was a ritual of putting silk on the body of the Darika lying in the ground and then the rebirth of the Darika. These ceremonies were known as 'Kuzhibali'.

== Costume ==
Darikan's whole body is smeared with Ninam (mixture of turmeric and lime) and sprinkled with popcorn. A three-meter-long cotton cloth is tied behind the head like a bow in the front. Popcorn indicates smallpox. Darikan also has metallic fang like tooth in his mouth.

Kali's appearance is similar to the female role in Kathakali. She wears a red dress with medals and wears a breast ornament called 'molamar'. It is tied around the waist and a red silk is worn over it. Kali also holds a sword in her hand.
