= Cholanaikkan language =

Dravidian language of India

Cholanaikkan
- Native to: India
- Region: Nilambur Valley, Malappuram, Kerala
- Ethnicity: Cholanaikkans
- Native speakers: (281 cited 1977)
- Language family: Dravidian: Southern; Southern I; Tamil–Kannada; (unclassified); Cholanaikkan

Language codes
- ISO 639-3: –

Cholanaikkan (IPA: [t͡ʃoːlɐnaːjkːɐn]) is a Southern Dravidian language spoken by the Cholanaikkan people in the hilly forests of the Nilambur Valley of Malappuram district of Kerala. They are largely a primitive hill tribe living in rock shelters near rivers in the valley. Some linguists believe the language to be distinct and that considering it an admixture of Tamil, Malayalam and Kannada is erroneous.
