= Ayyappanum Koshiyum =

2020 Indian film directed by Sachy

- Theatrical release poster
- Directed by: Sachy
- Written by: Sachy
- Produced by: Ranjith; P. M. Sasidharan
- Starring: Biju Menon; Prithviraj Sukumaran
- Cinematography: Sudeep Elamon
- Edited by: Ranjan Abraham
- Music by: Jakes Bejoy
- Production company: Gold Coin Motion Picture Company
- Distributed by: Central Pictures
- Release date: 7 February 2020
- Running time: 175 minutes
- Country: India
- Language: Malayalam
- Box office: ₹36.33 crore

Ayyappanum Koshiyum (transl. Ayyappan and Koshy) is a 2020 Indian Malayalam-language action drama film written and directed by Sachy (in his final film as director). Produced by Ranjith and P. M. Sasidharan, the film stars Biju Menon and Prithviraj Sukumaran in the lead roles, with Gowri Nandha, Anna Rajan, Ranjith, Anil Nedumangad, Anu Mohan, Sabumon Abdusamad, Shaju Shridhar, Kottayam Ramesh and Aji John in supporting roles.

Ayyappanum Koshiyum was released on 7 February 2020, and emerged as one of the highest grossing Malayalam films of 2020, grossing ₹36.33 crore worldwide. It earned 4 awards at the 68th National Film Awards, including the National Awards for Best Direction for Sachy, Best Supporting Actor for Biju Menon, Best Female Playback Singer for Nanjiyamma, and Best Stunt Choreography for Mafia Sasi, Supreme Sundar, and Rajasekhar.

A Telugu remake, Bheemla Nayak starring Pawan Kalyan and Rana Daggubati was released on 25 February 2022.

== Plot ==
Koshy Kurian, an ex-Havildar in Indian Army, is on the way to Ooty from Kattappana, with his driver Kumaran. Koshy is drunk and nearly passed out in the car's backseat with a case full of alcohol, bought from the military canteen. Instead of the common route via Coimbatore, they have opted to take the Attappadi hill route, which they did not know was an alcohol prohibited region. The car is stopped on a monthly traffic check, which is a combined police, forest, and excise department work. On finding the alcohol in the car, the excise officials manhandled Koshy. Koshy, irritated by this, assaults the excise inspector Faizal. On seeing this, SI Ayyappan Nair steps in and restrains Koshy. Koshy is taken to the local police station, and an FIR is filed against him in the online records system. Within minutes, the officers are startled to see the names of well-known political and media personalities on the contact list of Koshy's mobile phone. Koshy reveals himself as an ex-army officer living in Kattappana and also the son of an influential and ruthless political leader named Kurian John, who is known for his rude and confrontational behaviour.

Fussing over this and over consultation with his CI Satheesh Kumar, Ayyappan decides to go easy and reveals himself as a native of the area, and that he has only 3 years to retire. Koshy asks Ayyappan to let him return home for 5 days to spend Christmas and promises to return for any prison sentence, but Ayyappan refuses, stating that he has been booked under non-bailable sections and may not go home. Soon, Koshy fakes a meltdown and asks for some alcohol, as he is an addict. Against his better instincts, Ayyappan pours him some from the confiscated stock with the help of a lady constable, Jessy. Koshy secretly records this on his phone. Koshy is remanded to 12 days in Palakkad sub-jail, where he is visited by his family. After 12 days, Koshy gets bail on the condition that he has to sign once every Monday and Thursday at Attappadi station. Upon his release, he uses the video footage to get Ayyappan and Jessy suspended for breaking the prohibition. Ayyappan is arrested, and his police medals are revoked. The next day, he is brought out on bail by Satheesh, who makes a compromise with Koshy's friend MLA George, that Koshy can sign for all future bail conditions at the same time, and end this melee, in return for not providing original video evidence at the enquiry against Ayyappan.

After signing at the station, Koshy goes back on his word, and his lawyer submits the video proof at the enquiry. Ayyappan has no answers to the enquiry done by the DYSP Cherian George, and despite saving Jessy's job, he is sure that his job is lost. Koshy meets him outside the DySP office and boards the bus to Attappadi, seemingly to apologise to him, but due to ego, they both challenge one another, and Koshy leaves in his car. Furious at this blatant act of pride, Ayyappan savagely beats a small-time crook, Kuttamani (who was aiding Koshy), in front of Koshy and demolishes Kuttamani's illegal building. Visibly horrified at Ayyappan raining down fury on Kuttamani, Satheesh reveals to Koshy that 25 years ago, Ayyappan was a brutal communist leader, who had killed 13 men, as they were commissioned by the landlords to get rid of union workers during the Kummatti festival at Mundoor. He was caught by MLA Master Chathan and made to join the police force; he had also turned very mild. He finds out that Ayyappan had a nickname during those days of crime Mundoor Maadan (the vampire of Mundoor). Frustrated, Koshy goes to drink in Anaikatti. While returning to Attappadi, Kumaran is arrested, and his car is impounded. Left without a phone, purse, or other options, Koshy starts to walk to Attappadi.

Ayyappan picks him up on his bike, and both taunt each other with death threats. Alighting from Ayyappan's bike, Koshy walks miles to Attappadi, where he is refused lodging as per Ayyappan's instructions. Koshy's phone is illegally given to Ayyappan by a young constable. Ayyappan calls Kurian John and tells him that his son will be in grave danger soon. Hearing about this and concerned for his son's safety, Kurian sends Koshy's cousins to aid him and covertly sends professional assailants as a precaution for his son's safety. The next day, Koshy and Ayyappan fight inside the police station, where the CI breaks up the fight, who assigns two policemen to guard Koshy at all times, but those policemen inform Ayyappan about Koshy's goons, and Ayyappan thrashes them. Kurian John uses his influence to get an arrest warrant for Ayyappan's wife Kannamma (and thus their toddler son) as she was affiliated with a Maoist organisation years ago. Koshy visits his home in Kattappana and asks Kurian to stop interfering in their tussle. Koshy's wife, Ruby, reprimands both of them and asks Koshy to amicably end the issue at once. Koshy realises that the peace of mind of his family is more important than his ego and decides to end this issue peacefully. With the help of his Priest cousin and lawyers, he frames a plan to save Ayyappan's job.

While Koshy is away to help Ayyappan, Ayyappan goes to Koshy's house in Kattappana to find him, after failing to see him in Attappadi for two days. After a brief showdown with Kurian, Ayyappan heads back to Attappadi to confront Koshy. Koshy demolishes Ayyappan's house as revenge for the showdown at Kattappana, and Ayyappan burns down Koshy's car with gunpowder. Both of them refuse to lodge a complaint against one another, and, monitoring the tense situation, police protection is assigned to Koshy. Kurian follows Ayyappan to Attappadi and tells Koshy that he will kill Ayyappan within 24 hours. Koshy informs the police that Kurian is in Attappadi and was the one who sent goons to kill Ayyappan earlier. Kurian is arrested and imprisoned. Meanwhile, Ayyappan is forced to flee his family from Attappadi to evade his wife's arrest. Ayyappan drops her and his son to safety, but the police arrive and arrest her in front of Ayyappan. When Ayyappan finally challenges Koshy, Koshy suggests having the showdown in Anaikatti town, beyond the jurisdiction of Kerala Police.

A face-off duel and after an epic showdown of exchanging blows, bear grips, and tossing each other over a puddle of water ensues, where Ayyappan gains the upper hand and locks Koshy in a fatal bear grip. Cherian, Satheesh, and the rest of the officers, who were clandestinely watching the fight, intervened and pulled them apart. Satheesh tells Ayyappan that Koshy framed himself as an alcohol addict, and Ayyappan had then poured alcohol for a medical emergency to keep Koshy's blood alcohol level as required for proper functioning. This has resulted in all charges against Ayyappan being dropped and him being reinstated into the police force. Also, they let him know that the IG cancelled Kannamma's arrest and that she will be released the next day. Ayyappan is brought to the police station and is imprisoned for a day, till the rejoining order arrives. A year later, Ayyappan is transferred, upon his request, to Kattappana, after which he visits Koshy and shakes hands with him.

== Cast ==
- Biju Menon as SI Ayyappan Nair/ "Mundoor Madan"
- Prithviraj Sukumaran as Havildhar Koshy Kurien "Koshi"
- Anil Nedumangad as CI Satheesh Kumar
- Gowri Nandha as Kannamma, Ayyappan's wife
- Anna Rajan as Ruby, Koshy's wife
- Ranjith as Kurian John, Koshy's father
- Kottayam Ramesh as Kumaran, Koshy's driver
- Anu Mohan as CPO Sujith
- Dhanya Ananya as CPO Jessy
- Aji John as Oomachen
- Nandu Anand as Joby
- Sabumon Abdusamad as Kuttamani
- Alancier Ley Lopez as MLA K. C. George
- Pazhani Swami as Excise Inspector Faizal
- Deepu G Panicker as CPO Ramesh
- Johny Antony as Himself (cameo appearance)
- Shaju Sreedhar as ASI Josephkutty
- DYSP Saleesh N. Sankaran as DYSP Cherian George
- Benzi Mathews as Adv. Rahim
- Renith Elamadu as Member
- Vinod Thomas as Sebastian
- Vineeth Thattil David as Simon
- Muhammad Musthafa

== Production ==
=== Development ===
Ayyappanum Koshiyum is the second directorial of writer-turned-director Sachy after Anarkali (2015) which also had Prithviraj Sukumaran and Biju Menon in the main roles. Written by Sachy himself, the film was produced by the film director and Sachy's long-term friend Ranjith along with P. M. Sasidharan under the production company Gold Coin Motion Picture Company. The film's idea was first formed as a story about the relationship between Koshy and his driver, Sachy had two real-life friends resembling them, a jewellery owner and his driver. Later, police sub-inspector was introduced into the plot, which took the story into its present form. Prithviraj played the lead role and Menon had a supporting role in their last collaboration, Anarkali. The film was titled Ayyappanum Koshiyum as Sachy wanted to state that both Prithviraj and Menon have equal importance in the story. Sachy did not have anyone in mind for the two lead roles while screenwriting. Their casting was done after finishing the screenplay.

=== Filming ===
Principal photography began in early October 2019 in Attappadi, Palakkad district. It was completed in early December 2019. Menon suffered burn injuries on hands and legs while filming in November.

== Music ==
The songs featured in the film and background score were composed by Jakes Bejoy, while the lyrics have been penned by B. K. Harinarayanan, Rafeeq Ahmed, and Nanjiyamma. The soundtrack album was released on 10 February 2020 by Manorama Music.

== Release ==
Ayyappanum Koshiyum was released on 7 February 2020. The film's satellite and digital rights are sold to Amazon Prime Video and Surya TV.

== Reception ==
=== Critical reception ===
The film received positive reviews from critics with praise for performances (particularly Prithviraj Sukumaran and Biju Menon), story, direction, dialogues, cinematography and its tradition to Kerala culture.

The New Indian Express wrote: "This is essentially a masterclass by Sachy on how to make a three-hour film by relying mostly on dialogues which carry enough power to not just reverberate through the walls of the movie hall but also each cell and nerve in your body. With a script like this, one doesn't need bullets or pyrotechnics to excite the audience. Sachy does that with his characters, a rare skill that not many filmmakers possess today in Malayalam cinema", and praised the performances. The Hindu wrote: "It is a dialogue-driven narrative, as much verbal as visual, but without over-punctuation or the burden of forced hilarity. The film also comes with a highly textured screenplay, creating an immaculate balance between lightness and intensity", and the cast gives a stand-out performance, also it is "nearly three hours of riveting reel time devoid of any customary gimmicks".

Baradwaj Rangan of Film Companion South wrote "...psychological flourishes make Ayyappanum Koshiyum a very different kind of masala movie about similar-yet-different, different-yet-similar men...as the film progresses, it becomes a very textured thing, with a bubbling undercurrent that keeps questioning a very specific kind of masculinity". The Times of India said that it is "a commercial film that reflects contemporary socio-political situations aptly" and Sachy "smartly scripts a story" that explains the struggles between an honest police officer and a rich spoiled brat, "the director manages to hold the audience in that compelling mood from start to finish" and "apart from a carefully written script with interesting characterisation, the casting is a bonus". According to The News Minute, "Prithviraj and Biju Menon spar in an engaging film ... the movie keeps you engaged for nearly all the three hours with no dramatic twists or turns or characters turning a new leaf overnight".

=== Box office ===
In the overseas opening weekend, it grossed US$36,253 (₹25.88 lakh) from 27 screens in the United States, US$3,562 (₹2.55 lakh) from 7 screens in Canada, and A$24,227 (₹11.65 lakh) from 7 screens in Australia. It grossed US$87,791 (₹65.03 lakh) in United States in five weeks, A$47,689 (₹23.04 lakh) in Australia in four weeks, NZ$28,012 (₹12.71 lakh) in New Zealand in three weeks, US$22,400 (₹16.17 lakh) in Canada in three weeks, and £48,267 (₹44.74 lakh) in two weeks. In its lifetime, Ayyappanum Koshiyum grossed ₹363 million at the global box office.

== Awards and nominations ==
Award (Note: Awards, festivals and organizations are in alphabetical order.)	Date of ceremony (Note: Date is linked to the article about the awards held that year, wherever possible.)	Category	Recipient(s)	Result	Ref.
Filmfare Awards South	9 October 2022	Best Film – Malayalam	Gold Coin Motion Picture Company	Won	
Filmfare Awards South	9 October 2022	Best Director – Malayalam	Sachy	Nominated	
Filmfare Awards South	9 October 2022	Best Actor – Malayalam	Biju Menon	Won	
Filmfare Awards South	9 October 2022	Best Supporting Actress – Malayalam	Gowri Nandha	Won	
Filmfare Awards South	9 October 2022	Best Lyricist – Malayalam	Rafeeq Ahamed – (for song "Ariyathariyathe")	Won	
Kerala Film Critics Association Awards	13 Septemder 2021	Best Screenplay	Sachy	Won	
Kerala Film Critics Association Awards	13 Septemder 2021	Best Actor	Prithviraj Sukumaran	Won	
Kerala Film Critics Association Awards	13 Septemder 2021	Best Actor	Biju Menon	Won	
Kerala State Film Awards	17 December 2021	Best Film with Popular Appeal and Aesthetic Value	Producer: Ranjith; Director: Sachy	Won	
Kerala State Film Awards	17 December 2021	Best Dubbing Artist	Riya Saira – (for Anna Rajan and Gowri Nandha)	Won	
Kerala State Film Awards	17 December 2021	Special Mention	Nanjiyamma – (for song "Kalakkatha")	Won	
Mazhavil Entertainment Awards	28 August 2022	Best Entertainer Film	Ranjith & P. M. Sasidharan	Won	
Mazhavil Entertainment Awards	28 August 2022	Best Entertainer Actor	Biju Menon	Won	
National Film Awards	30 September 2022	Best Direction	Sachy	Won	
National Film Awards	30 September 2022	Best Supporting Actor	Biju Menon	Won	
National Film Awards	30 September 2022	Best Female Playback Singer	Nanjiyamma – (for song "Kalakkatha")	Won	
National Film Awards	30 September 2022	Best Stunt Choreography	• Rajasekhar • Mafia Sasi • Supreme Sunder	Won	
South Indian International Movie Awards	19 September 2021	Best Film – Malayalam	Gold Coin Motion Pictures	Won	
South Indian International Movie Awards	19 September 2021	Best Director – Malayalam	Sachy	Nominated	
South Indian International Movie Awards	19 September 2021	Best Cinematographer – Malayalam	Sudeep Elamon	Won	
South Indian International Movie Awards	19 September 2021	Best Actor – Malayalam	Prithviraj Sukumaran	Won	
South Indian International Movie Awards	19 September 2021	Best Actor – Malayalam	Biju Menon	Nominated	
South Indian International Movie Awards	19 September 2021	Best Supporting Actor – Malayalam	Anil Nedumangad	Nominated	
South Indian International Movie Awards	19 September 2021	Best Supporting Actress – Malayalam	Gowri Nandha	Won	
South Indian International Movie Awards	19 September 2021	Best Comedian – Malayalam	Sabumon Abdusamad	Nominated	
South Indian International Movie Awards	19 September 2021	Best Music Director – Malayalam	Jakes Bejoy	Won	
South Indian International Movie Awards	19 September 2021	Best Lyricist – Malayalam	Rafeeq Ahamed – (for song "Thaalam Poyi")	Nominated	
South Indian International Movie Awards	19 September 2021	Best Female Playback Singer – Malayalam	Nanjiyamma – (for song "Kalakkatha")	Nominated	
South Indian International Movie Awards	19 September 2021	Best Female Playback Singer – Malayalam	Sangeethaa Sajith – (for song "Thaalam Poyi")	Nominated	
