= Hilpulayan =

Adhivasi group in Kerala, South India

The Hilpulyan are an Adivasi group in Kerala, India. They have the lowest education level, the most unsanitary living-conditions and generally the lowest income level of any Adivasi group in Idukki District.

== Occupation ==
Most work as manual laborers on the farms of others and supplement their food and other resources by foraging in the forests.

== Sources ==
- Article on Adivasi in Idukki district
