= List of Scheduled Castes in Kerala =

Below a list of Scheduled Caste communities and their population according to Scheduled Castes and Scheduled Tribes Order (Amendment Act) 1976 and as amended by the Constitution (Scheduled castes) Orders (Second Amendment) Act, 2002 (Act 61 of 2002) vide Part VIII- Kerala- Schedule I notified in the Gazette of India, dated 18 December 2002) and (As amended by the Scheduled Castes and Scheduled Tribes Orders (Amendment) Act 2002 (Act 10 of 2003) vide Part VII- Kerala- Second Schedule notified in the Gazette of India dated 8 January 2003 in Kerala.

== List ==
1. Adi Andhra
2. Adi Dravida
3. Adi Karnataka
4. Ajila
5. Arunthathiyar
6. Ayyanavar
7. Baira
8. Bakuda
9. Bathada
10. Bharathar (other than Parathar), Paravan
11. Chakkiliyan
12. Chamar, Muchi
13. Chandala
14. Cheruman
15. Domban
16. Gosangi
17. Holeya
18. Kadaiyan
19. Kakkalan, Kakkan
20. Kalladi
21. Kanakkan, Padanna, Padannan
22. Kavara (other than Telugu speaking or Tamil speaking Balija, Kavarai, Gavara, Gavarai, Gavarai Naidu, Balija Naidu, Gajalu Balija or Valai Chetty)
23. Koosa
24. Kootan, Koodan
25. Kudumban
26. Kuravan, Sidhanar, Kuravar, Kurava, Sidhana
27. Maila
28. Malayan [in the areas comprising the Malabar district as specified by sub-section (2) of section 5 of the States Reorganisation Act, 1956 (37of 1956)]a
29. Mannan, Pathiyan, Perumannan, Vannan, Velan
30. Moger (other than Mogeyar)
31. Mundala
32. Nalakeyava
33. Nalkadaya
34. Nayadi
35. Nerian
36. Pallan
37. Palluvan
38. Pambada
39. Panan
40. Paraiyan, Parayan, Sambavar, Sambavan, Sambava, Paraya, Paraiya, Parayar
41. Pulayan, Cheramar, Pulaya, Pulayar, Cherama, Cheraman, Wayanad Pulayan, Wayanadan Pulayan, Matha, Matha Pulayan
42. Puthirai Vannan
43. Raneyar
44. Samagara
45. Samban
46. Semman, Chemman, Chemmar
47. Thandan (excluding Ezhuvas and Thiyyas who are known as Thandan, in the erstwhile Cochin and Malabar areas) and (Carpenters who are known as Thachan, in the erstwhile Cochin and Travancore State)
48. Thoti
49. Vallon
50. Valluvan
51. Vetan
52. Vettuvan, Pulaya Vettuvan (in the areas of erstwhile Cochin State only)

== Demographics ==
The population of Scheduled castes in Kerala (as of 2011 census)

Scheduled Castes		Population (2011)	
SC Code	Community	Total Population	Percent of total
001	Adi Andhra	1,252	0.04
002	Adi Dravida	4,272	0.14
003	Adi Karnataka	1,629	0.05
004	Ajila	54	<0.01
005	Arunthathiyar	2,731	0.09
006	Ayyanavar	11,168	0.38
007	Baira	1,040	0.03
008	Bakuda	6,321	0.21
009	Bathada	20	<0.01
010	Bharathar (other than Parathar), Paravan	35,120	1.15
011	Chakkiliyan	37,776	1.24
012	Chamar, Muchi	207	<0.01
013	Chandala	48	<0.01
014	Cheruman	3,17,218	10.44
015	Dombar	756	0.02
016	Gosangi	32	<0.01
017	Hasla	0	0.00
018	Holeya	1,060	0.03
019	Kadaiyan	1,844	0.06
020	Kakkan, Kalakkan	6,133	0.20
021	Kalladi	38,616	1.27
022	Kanakkan, Padanna, Padannan	2,45,593	8.08
023	Kavara (other than Tamil-speaking Balija, etc.)	16,162	0.53
024	Koosa	24	<0.01
025	Kootan, Koodan	5,008	0.16
026	Kudumban	2,707	0.09
027	Kuruvan, Sidhanar, Kuruvar, Kuruva, Sidhana	2,77,377	9.12
028	Maila	239	<0.01
029	Malayan	9,581	0.31
030	Mannan, Pathiyan, Perrumannan, Vellan, Vanan	2,32,690	7.65
031	Moger (other than Mogeriya)	24,642	0.81
032	Mundala	242	<0.01
033	Nalakeyava	274	<0.01
034	Nalkadaya	1,847	0.06
035	Nayadi	2,828	0.09
036	Pallar	46,934	1.54
037	Palluvan	5,865	0.19
038	Pambada	22	<0.01
039	Panan	51,485	1.69
040	Paraiyan, Parayan, Sambavar, Sambavan, Sambava, Paraya	2,27,433	7.48
041	Pulayan, Cheramar, Pulaya, Wayanad Pulaya, Cheraman	10,20,790	33.58
042	Puthirai Vannan	440	0.01
043	Raneyar	10	<0.01
044	Samagara	131	<0.01
045	Samban	4,986	0.16
046	Semman, Chemman	2,335	0.08
047	Thandan (excluding Ezhava and Thiyyas, who are known as Carpenters)	1,31,533	4.33
048	Thoti	423	0.01
049	Vallon	568	0.02
050	Valluvan	18,421	0.61
051	Vetan	22,268	0.73
052	Vettuvan, Palaya Vettuvan	73,909	2.43
053	Nerian	3	<0.01
Generic castes, etc (those who identified themselves as "Dalit", "Harijan", or "Anusuchit Jati")		1,45,506	4.79
		30,39,573	100%

*NA is used for communities not counted in 2011 census, but were included in Scheduled castes list in 2001

=== District wise ===
District		Scheduled Castes		
Name	Population (2011)	Population	Percent	Top 3 largest castes
Kasaragod	1,307,375	53,283	4.08	Moger (23,790); Pulaya (9,256); Bakuda (3,934)
Kannur	2,523,003	83,350	3.30	Pulaya (44,385); Mannan (12,726); Malayan (5,888)
Wayanad	817,420	32,578	3.98	Pulaya (7,255); Cheruman (5,250); Mannan (4,285)
Kozhikode	3,086,293	199,191	6.45	Pulaya (60,573); Cheruman (49,871); Mannan (20,904)
Malappuram	4,112,920	308,266	7.50	Kanakkan (101,843); Cheruman (93,894); Mannan (36,543)
Palakkad	2,809,934	403,833	14.37	Cheruman (164,812); Kanakkan (93,185); Mannan (32,823)
Thrissur	3,121,200	324,350	10.39	Pulaya (143,422); Vettuvan (62,474); Kanakkan (38,073)
Ernakulam	3,282,388	268,411	8.18	Pulaya (197,679); Paraiya (18,295); Mannan (14,957)
Idukki	1,108,974	145,486	13.12	Paraiya (47,037); Pallan (39,452); Pulaya (29,699)
Kottayam	1,974,551	153,909	7.79	Pulaya (82,556); Paraiya (24,659); Mannan (18,858)
Alappuzha	2,127,789	201,211	9.46	Pulaya (111,712); Thandan (31,868); Mannan (21,922)
Pathanamthitta	1,197,412	164,465	13.73	Pulaya (60,451); Kuruvan (58,718); Paraiya (16,832)
Kollam	2,635,375	328,263	12.46	Kuruvan (112,129); Pulaya (93,792); Thandan (53,121)
Thiruvananthapuram	3,301,427	372,977	11.30	Pulaya (149,102); Kuruvan (81,575); Thandan (39,053)
	33,406,061	3,039,573	9.10	

== See also ==
- Scheduled Caste and Scheduled Tribes Development Department (Kerala)
- Ministry of Social Justice and Empowerment
