= Malavettuvan =

The Malavettuvan is one of the tribal communities in the Kasaragod district of Kerala state, India.They are called vettuvans, because they were experts in hunting.
