= Malappandaram tribe =

The Malapandaram, also known as Mala Pandaram or Malai Pandaram, are an indigenous tribal community primarily inhabiting the eastern hilly regions of Kollam and Pathanamthitta districts in Kerala. Their presence extends to parts of Kottayam and Idukki districts as well. They are a tribal people who live in the forest areas of Tamil Nadu and Kerala. The Malapandaram are recognized as a Particularly Vulnerable Tribal Group (PVTG) in Kerala, highlighting their unique needs and precarious situation.

== A Unique Language and Rich Cultural Heritage ==
The Malappandaram speak a distinctive language (Malappandaram language), a Dravidian sub-dialect with influences from both Tamil and Malayalam. This unique language is primarily an oral tradition, passed down through generations, without a written script. This reliance on oral transmission makes the preservation of their linguistic heritage a critical concern. The community is also found in parts of Tamil Nadu and is included in the state's Scheduled Tribes list. Government estimates place their total population at approximately 1,600-1,700 individuals.

Anthropologists, including British ethnographer Edgar Thurston (1912) and anthropologist Brian Morris (1980s), have studied the Malapandaram, documenting their social structure, language, and way of life. However, systematic efforts to record and preserve their cultural traditions remain limited.

== Nomadic Lifestyle and Forest Dependence ==
Traditionally, the Malappandaram are nomadic forest dwellers, relying heavily on forest resources for their sustenance. Their practice involves temporary settlements, moving from one location to another to collect Non-Timber Forest Products (NTFPs). Historically, during the Travancore era, the Malappandaram were adept at collecting NTFPs, using them for both subsistence and trade. They engaged in barter with traders, exchanging forest produce for essential goods. Today, their livelihood continues to be primarily dependent on these forest resources.

The community is organized into groups known as 'Kootam', each led by a 'Muttukani'. The Muttukani plays a vital role in social and ceremonial matters, resolving disputes and performing rituals. Their social structure emphasizes self-determination and individual freedom rather than a dominant hierarchy. Family and marital relationships are often described as fluid and based on personal choice. Historically, they traded NTFPs such as honey, curry nuts, roots, and medicinal plants for their basic needs, a practice that continues to some extent today.

== Spiritual Beliefs and Environmental Knowledge ==
The Malappandaram possess their own unique customs and worship practices. Their deep connection to the forest has endowed them with a vast repository of environmental knowledge. Their primary religious belief is animistic, involving the worship of forest spirits, forest deities, and the souls of their ancestors. Certain healing practices and rituals may involve trance-like states or ceremonial dances.

== Challenges in Education and Development ==
The Malappandaram community faces significant challenges in education, with a very low literacy rate. The lack of dedicated educational facilities within their settlements necessitates external intervention to foster a literate generation. Key challenges include linguistic disadvantages (with Malayalam being their official language for schooling), the absence of transmissible learning methods, inadequate access to clean drinking, water and sanitation, genetic diseases, and child malnutrition. A significant majority of Malappandaram children do not attend school.

Despite forced resettlement in some areas, the community has often lost traditional livelihood opportunities. Deforestation further reduces their access to vital resources. They remain largely excluded from modern development initiatives, and their rich cultural heritage remains largely undocumented.

== Demographic Overview ==
Current data indicates that the Malappandaram community comprises 1,662 individuals across 514 families. The average family size is 3.23, which is considerably lower than the state average. The population consists of 821 males and 841 females, indicating a female-to-male ratio of 1024 females per 1000 males, suggesting a higher female population.

Approximately 97% of Malappandaram families reside in Kollam and Pathanamthitta districts, with the remaining scattered across Kottayam and Idukki. Their population is distributed across 16 Grama Panchayats and one Municipality. Concentrations are notably higher in Piravanthoor and Aryankavu Grama Panchayats in Kollam district, and Ranni, Perunad, Seethathodu, and Aruvappulam Grama Panchayats in Pathanamthitta district.

== Current Status ==
The Malappandaram community continues to lag in literacy, and existing development projects have not adequately supported the creation of a literate generation. Their heavy reliance on forest resources may become increasingly challenging over time. Targeted, community-centric initiatives are crucial to improve their livelihoods and facilitate social upliftment. Educational advancement and integration with modern societal currents are indispensable for the future well-being of this unique tribal community.
