= Cholanaikkan =

Indigenous community from South India

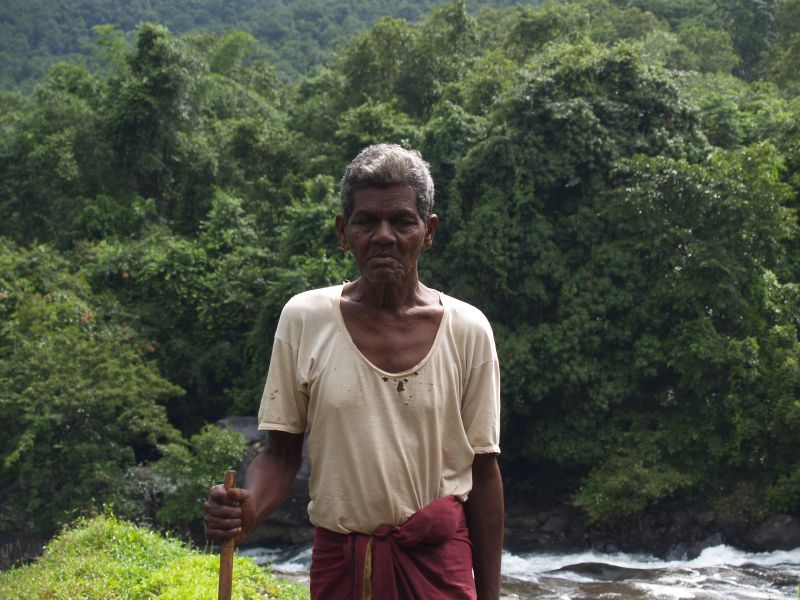
- A Cholanaikkan in Nilambur.

Total population
- 191

Regions with significant populations
- India

Languages
- Cholanaikkan

The Cholanaikkans are an ethnic group or indigenous community from India. They primarily inhabit the southern Kerala State, especially Silent Valley National Park, and are one of the last remaining hunter-gatherer tribes of the region. The Cholanaikkans speak the Cholanaikkan language, which belongs to the Dravidian family.

== Etymology ==
The Cholanaikkan call themselves as ‘Malanaikan’ or ‘Sholanaikan’. They are called Cholanaikan because they inhabit the interior forests. ‘Chola’ or ‘shola’ means patches of stunted forest lined by grasslands, and ‘naikan’ means King. They are said to have migrated from Mysore forests.

== Background ==
The Cholanaikkan traditionally reside in the Karulai and Chungathara forest ranges near Nilambur, which fall in Nilambur Taluk of Malappuram district. Until the 1960s, they were leading a secluded life with very limited contact with mainstream urban society. Since then, the Cholanaikkans' traditional lifestyle has been altered. They currently have a 16% literacy rate.

The Cholanaikkan numbered 360 individuals in the 1991 census. Their population has since fallen considerably, with only 191 members today. C.Vinod is the first one to graduate from this ethnic group. He completed his postgraduate and M.Phil and currently doing research. They are categorised as a Particularly Vulnerable Tribal Group by the Government of India.

== Anthropology and culture ==
They are generally of short stature with well-built sturdy bodies. The complexion varies from dark to light brown. The faces are round or oval with depressed nasal root, their bridge being medium and the profile straight, lips are thin to the medium, hair tends to be curly. They live in rock shelters called ‘Kallulai’ or in open campsites made of leaves. They are found in groups consisting of 2 to 7 primary families. Each group is called a ‘Chemmam’. The Cholanaikans are very particular in observing the rules framed by their ancestors for the purpose of maintaining the territories under the Chemmam.

== Economy ==
The Chemmams are found widely scattered in the forest ranges. They subsist on food-gathering, hunting and minor forest produce collection. Their language is a mixture of Kannada, Tamil and Malayalam. They use dress and ornaments, household articles, tools and weapons in their daily life. They use rice as their staple food. They also use wild roots, tubers, seeds, fruits and meat. Their livelihood is totally dependent on the forest. The collection and selling of minor forest produce is the major source of income. There are still many customs, practices and taboos prevailing among the Cholanaikans.

== Language ==
The Cholanaikkans speak the Cholanaikkan language as a mother tongue. It is a member of the Dravidian family. Around half of them also have a basic knowledge of Malayalam.

== See also ==
- Demographics of Kerala

Major Tribes in Kerala by Philipose Vaidyar https://sites.google.com/view/focusonpeople/major-tribes-in-kerala
