= Malayan tribe =

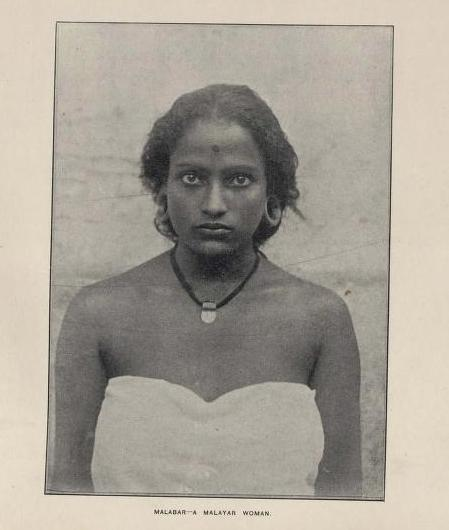
A Malayar woman in Tellicherry (Thalassery) in 1902, who wore no upper clothing, a drapery was added by F. Dunsterville for pictorial effect.

The Malayans are an Indian tribal community mostly found in Edamalayar of Kuttampuzha panchayat in Idukki district, Kerala. Classified as Scheduled Tribe in the state, the Malayans are adapted to occupations such as bamboo cutting, fishing, manual labour, and forest produce collection. They also lease their farmlands for nominal sums to land lords, and do manual labour in their own lands. Malayans are also found in forest areas from Thundathil to Parambikulam in forest ranges of Thrissur and Ernakulam districts. Malayalam-speaking Malayans exist as two subgroups—Nattumalayans and Kongamalayans. "Malayan" means "man on the hills" or "man who makes a livelihood by the hills". Today, these Malayan tribes have taken active participation in all educational as well as cultural fests.

== Cultural fests ==
Malayan tribal festivals and fairs play an important part in the society of these Malayan tribes, which also emphasizes the cultural exuberance of the community. Amongst various feted festivals, especially in Idukki district, the Adimali Fest is the most famous one. It is actually the tourism and agricultural festival held mainly in the mountainous region since the beginning of the year 1991. After that once in a year this festival is observed by the Malayan tribes during the last week of the month of December.

During the Adimali Festival, fairs and exhibition are organized in the venue. Myriads of the cultivators make a display of various items that they have prepared on their own hands. Exhibition of the stalls of various government departments, institutions and agencies are of huge appeal along with the exhibition stalls of the trade fair. An agricultural fair at Thodupuzha is also important and is held every year under the protection of the agricultural society.

Ninabali is a ritualistic performing art performed by Malaya community mainly in Kannur, Kozhikode districts of northern Kerala. This art form, which is performed in homes as part of Hinuist exorcism ceremonies, depicts the battle between Bhadrakali and the asura Darika.
