= Ravula =

Tribal community in India

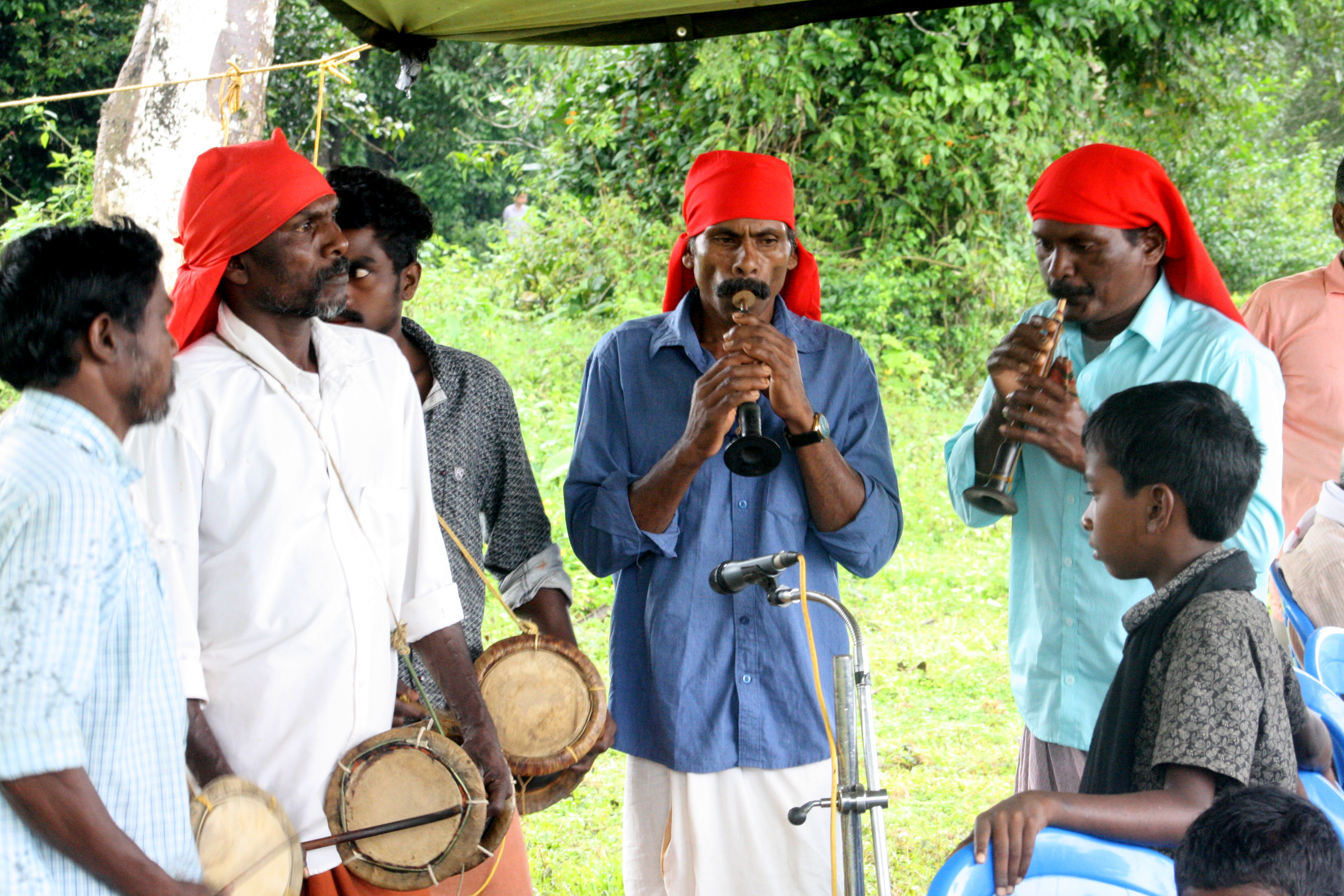
- Kambala Dance performed by Ravula Tribals

Total population
- 41,885

Regions with significant populations
- India
- Karnataka: 30,359
- Kerala: 11,526

Languages
- Ravula • Malayalam

Religion
- Animism • Hinduism

The Ravula (Adiyar in Malayalam, Yerava in Kannada, IPA: [raːʋuɭɐ, jerɐʋɐ, ɐɖijɐr]) are a tribal community or indigenous community in Karnataka and Kerala in India. Their common language is known as the Ravula language. They live predominantly the Kodagu district of Karnataka along with its adjacent regions in the districts of Kannur and Wayanad in Kerala. Most of them are agricultural workers and are in the process of detribalization. It is believed that they were agricultural serfs in the past. During the annual festival at the Valliyurkkavu temple in Mananthavady, Wayand, the Adyar people gather to trade services with landlords.

Their settlements are called 'Kunju.' They are monogamous, and mostly practice negotiated marriage, although there are several elopement marriages among them. They are mostly agricultural laborers in coffee plantations and tea estates, although some are employed by the Forest Department or in other occupations. Yerevan tribals believe in magic, and are animists, although they still perform worship to Hindu deities like Chamundeswariamma and Kaveriamma. They have their own system of medicines.

== Culture ==
There are many customs and rituals practiced among the Adiyas who believe in witchcraft. Gadhika is a ritual dance form performed by them to cure disease, ward off miseries and evil eye, and safe delivery of child.
