= First Bell =

Indian digital teaching platform

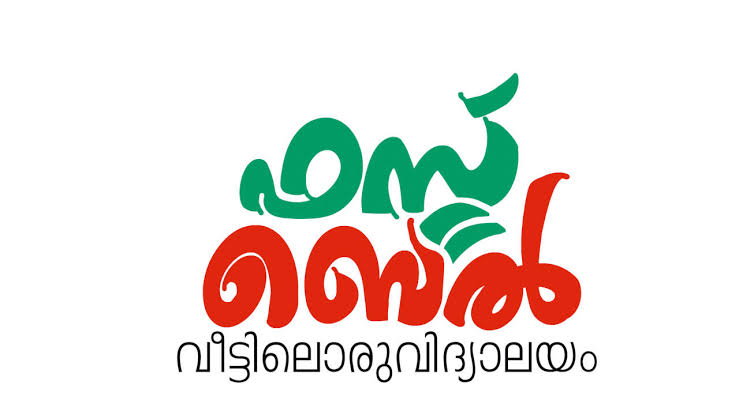
- Logo of First Bell in Malayalam
- Website type: Educational platform
- Available in: Malayalam
- Owner: Department of General and Higher Education, Kerala
- Creator: Government of Kerala
- Key people: Pinarayi Vijayan (Chief Minister of Kerala)
- Website: Official Website
- Commercial: No
- Launched: June 1, 2020
- Current status: Active

First Bell is a digital teaching platform for primary education in Kerala, India. First Bell is an interim arrangement for regular classes for students of Std 1 to 12 (Kerala State syllabus). It is an initiative by the Kerala Infrastructure Technology for Education (KITE) and a part of Kite Victers (Versatile ICT Enabled Resource for Students). It is owned by the Department of General and Higher Education.

== Starting ==
First Bell started from 1 June 2020 through VICTERS, in the situation of hiking crisis caused by the COVID-19 pandemic. Actually, this is an effort by the State Education Department to ensure that the students do not miss out on lessons due to COVID-19 induced lockdown. It is inaugurated by the Chief Minister of Kerala, Shri.Pinarayi Vijayan. The second edition of First Bell started from 1 June 2021, in the name 'First Bell 2.0'.

== Teaching methods ==
First Bell is a virtual teaching platform. First Bell have several teaching methods from its starting. First Bell's live telecasting of the episodes, is through the free Television channel of VICTERS. The second one is the telecasting through the YouTube channel of KITE VICTERS named 'itsvicters' (this is not for live telecasting). First Bell's teaching is through interactive sessions and informative animations. This is very useful and a popular method for teaching.

== YouTube channel ==
First Bell's YouTube channel is named 'itsvicters'. It is for uploading the episodes for the students of several grades. The uploading in this YouTube channel is after the live telecast in the Television channel of KITE VICTERS. The monthly viewers of this channel is 15 million (150 crore).

== Grades ==
First Bell episodes are available in the website of KITE VICTERS and YouTube channel. These episodes are prepared for the students of 1 to 12 grades. First Bell also has a program for the children studying in pre-primary, named 'Kilikkonchal'. This program is also available in all First Bell sources.

== See also ==
- Kite Victers
- KITE Kerala
- Government of Kerala
- Pinarayi Vijayan
- List of Malayalam-language television channels
