= Kite Victers =

Indian Malayalam-language educational entertainment television channel

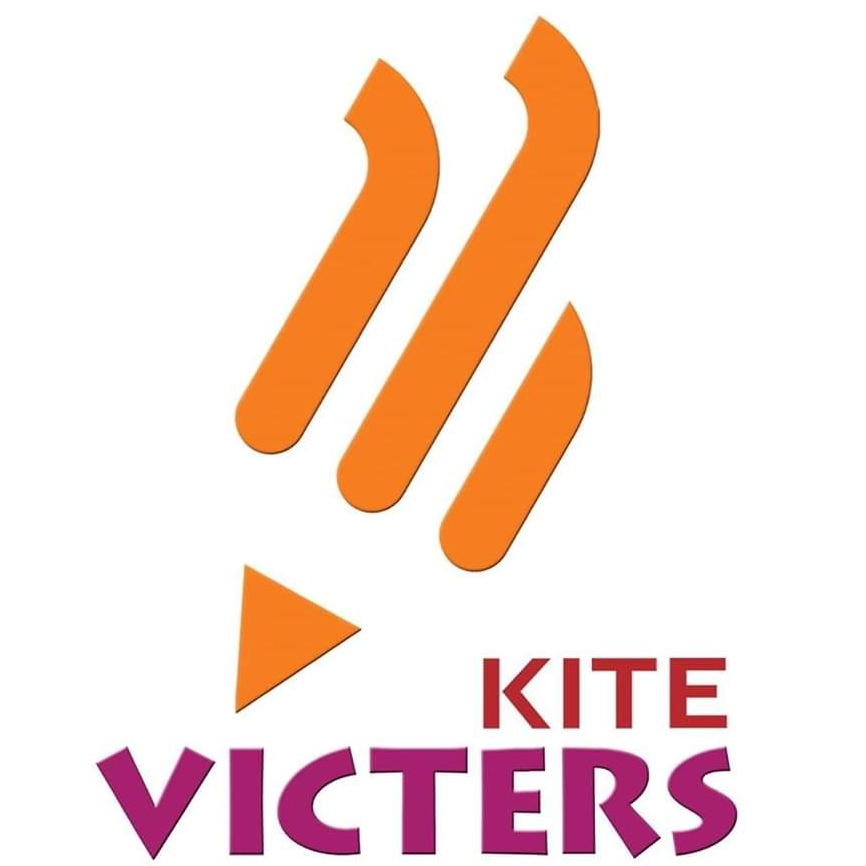
- Logo used since 2005
- Country: India
- Broadcast area: India
- Headquarters: Thiruvananthapuram, Kerala

Programming
- Picture format: 576i SDTV
- Timeshift service: Kite Victers Plus

Ownership
- Owner: Department of General Education Keralam

History
- Launched: 28 July 2005; 21 years ago

Links
- Website: victers.kite.kerala.gov.in

Kite Victers is an Indian state-owned free-to-air children's Educational entertainment television channel owned and operated by KITE Kerala under the Department of General Education and is wholly owned by the Government of Kerala. The channel is headquartered in Thiruvananthapuram, Kerala.

Kite Victers is an acronym for "Kerala Infrastructure and Technology for Education - Versatile Information and Communications Technology (ICT) Enabled Resource for Students". Along with Sun TV Network's Kochu TV, it is one of the two children's television channels in Malayalam (excluding Malayalam audio feeds in pan-India channels). The channel is broadcast on the state-operated GSAT-18 communications satellite.

== Kite Victers Plus ==
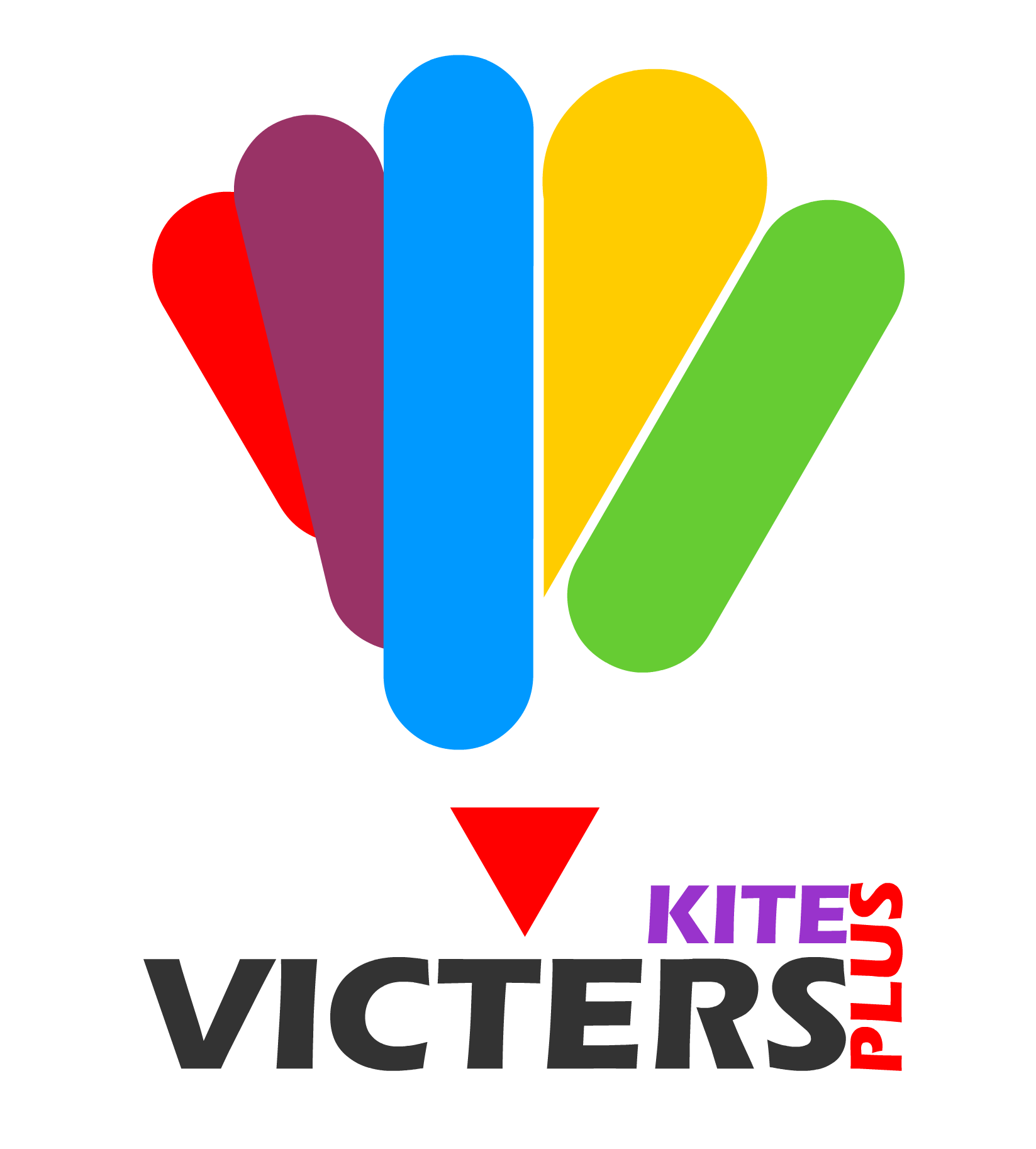

Kite Victers Plus is the Second channel owned by KITE Kerala. It was launched in September 2021. As part of the First Bell, Digital Classes for Pre- Primary to 12th Standard are being aired through Kite Victers channel. Despite being telecast 24/7 even with the repeats, the demand for more air-time for classes was felt significantly. It was in this context, it was decided to explore the possibility of a Second channel of Kite Victers using the existing bandwidth.

== Establishment ==
Kerala Infrastructure and Technology for Education is the nodal agency for implementing the EDUSAT network and runs KITE VICTERS, the exclusive channel for education which is aired from 6 am to 11 pm. India's epoch making first broadband network on EDUSAT for schools, KITE VICTERS inaugurated by A P J Abdul Kalam, the president of India, on 28 July 2005 in Thiruvananthapuram.

The telecast of programs started in August 2006 through the assistance of EDUSAT network. The channel is telecasted for 17 hours a day from 6 am to 11 pm. KITE VICTERS offers interactive virtual classrooms that enable the school students as well as the teachers to directly communicate with the subject experts and educationists. It also ensures the dissemination of high-quality education to the students and teachers from the original source.

== Programming and shows ==
- First Bell
- Shastra vicharam
- Keralam Mannum Manushyanum
- Jeevante thudippu
- Kaliyum karyvum
- Kerala yathra
- Paithrukam
- Vijnanadhaara
- Padanakauthukam, Shastrakauthukam educational programmes
- Examination oriented programme for SSLC and Plus 2 level
- Beyond the text
- Deutsche Welle Time
- Drishya paadam
- Global Three Thousand
- Haritha Vidhyalayam
- IT for All
- Innalekalile Innu
- Kadhaparayum Neram
- Kerala Sree
- Magic fingers
- Mozhimuthukal
- Naadavismayam
- Ormayile Malayalam
- Pusthakangalkkoppam
- Shasthramuthukal
- Tomorrow Today
- Vazhikaatti

== See also ==
- List of Malayalam-language television channels
