= List of Malayalam-language television channels =

This is a list of satellite television channels in Malayalam language (spoken in the Indian state of Kerala and the Union territory of Lakshadweep) broadcasting at least throughout Kerala state and in Middle East Countries. Besides these, there exist a number of local channels concentrating in a particular area or town in the region.

== List of channels ==
=== State owned channels ===
#	Name	Logo	Launch	FTA/pay	HD version	Owner	Note
1	DD Malayalam		1985	FTA	No	Doordarshan	State owned
2	Kite Victers		2005	FTA	No	KITE	State owned
3	Kite Victers Plus		2021	FTA	No	KITE	State owned

=== General entertainment ===
#	Name	Logo	Launch	FTA/pay	HD version	Owner	Note
1	Asianet		1993	Pay	Yes	JioStar	1^{st} Malayalam GEC in SD and HD
2	Sun Surya		1998	Pay	Yes	Sun TV Network	
3	Kairali TV		2000	FTA	No	Kairali TV Network	
4	Jeevan TV		2002	FTA	No	Jeevan Telecasting Corporation	
5	Amrita TV		2005	FTA	No	Amrita Enterprises	
6	Kerala Vision		2010	FTA	No	Kerala Communicators Cable Limited	
7	Mazhavil Manorama		2011	FTA	No	Malayala Manorama	
8	Kaumudy TV		2013	FTA	No	Kerala Kaumudi	
9	Sakhi		2014	FTA	No	Sakhi Media LLC	
10	Flowers TV		2015	Pay	No	Insight Media City	
11	Zee Keralam		2018	Pay	Yes	Zee Entertainment Enterprises	

=== Movies ===
#	Name	Logo	Launch	FTA/pay	HD version	Owner	Note
1	Sun Surya Movies		2004	Pay	No	Sun TV Network	
2	Kairali We		2007	FTA	No	Kairali TV Network	Kairali Movies rebranding soon
3	Asianet Plus		2005	Pay	No	JioStar	
4	Asianet Movies		2012	Pay	Yes	JioStar	

=== Music ===
#	Name	Logo	Launch	FTA/pay	HD version	Owner	Note
1	Raj Musix Malayalam		2007	FTA	No	Raj Television Network	
2	Kappa TV		2013	FTA	No	Mathrubhumi Group	
3	Sun Surya Music		2014	Pay	No	Sun TV Network	

=== Comedy ===
#	Name	Logo	Launch	FTA/pay	HD version	Owner	Note
1	Sun Surya Comedy		2017	Pay	No	Sun TV Network	

=== Kids ===
#	Name	Logo	Launch	FTA/pay	HD version	Owner	Note
1	Kochu TV		2011	Pay	No	Sun TV Network	

=== Infotainment ===
#	Name	Logo	Launch	FTA/pay	HD version	Owner	Note
1	Safari TV		2013	FTA	No	Safari Multimedia	

=== Devonation ===
#	Name	Logo	Launch	FTA/pay	HD version	Owner	Note
1	Shalom TV		2005	FTA	No	Shalom Communications	
2	Powervision		2006	FTA	No	Value Vision Broadcasting	
3	Goodness TV		2010	FTA	No	Goodness Media	
4	Harvest TV		2011	FTA	No		
5	Darshana TV		2012	FTA	No	Sathyadhara Communications	
6	Shekinah TV		2019	FTA	No	Shekinah Communications	

=== Shopping ===
#	Name	Logo	Launch	FTA/pay	HD version	Owner	Note
1	Malayalam Naaptol			FTA	No	Naaptol	

=== News ===
#	Name	Logo	Launch	FTA/pay	HD version	Owner	Note
1	24 News		2018	FTA	No	Insight Media City	
2	Asianet News		2001	FTA	No	Jupiter Entertainment Ventures	
3	Kairali News		2005	FTA	No	Kairali TV Network	
4	Manorama News		2006	FTA	No	Malayala Manorama	
5	JaiHind TV		2007	FTA	No	Bharath Broadcasting Network	
6	Raj News Malayalam		2011	FTA	No	Raj Television Network	
7	Reporter TV		2011, Revamped on 1 July 2023	FTA	No	Reporter Broadcasting Company Private Limited (RBC)	
8	Mathrubhumi News		2013	FTA	No	Mathrubhumi Group	
9	Media One TV		2013	FTA	No	Madhyamam Broadcasting	
10	Janam TV		2015	FTA	No	Janam Multimedia	
11	News18 Kerala		2016	Pay	No	TV18	
12	News Malayalam 24×7		2024	FTA	No	Splus Media	
13	Big TV 24x7 Malayalam		2026	FTA	No	Big TV News Network	

== Malayalam HD channels ==
Name	Video	Audio	Owner	Launch date	Note
Asianet HD	Full HD	Dolby Digital Plus | 7.1	JioStar	14 August 2015	First HD channel in Malayalam
Asianet Movies HD	Full HD	Dolby Digital Plus | 7.1	JioStar	15 March 2023	
Mazhavil Manorama HD	Upscaled	Stereo | 2.0	Malayala Manorama Group	14 August 2015	
Surya TV HD	Full HD	Dolby Digital | 5.1	Sun TV Network	16 March 2017	
Zee Keralam HD	Full HD	Stereo | 5.1	Zee Entertainment Enterprises	26 November 2018	

== Malayalam audio feeds ==
Some Indian channels (mainly English) are telecasting with multiple audio feeds, including Malayalam.

(Last Updated on 26/02/2025)

- Discovery Channel
- Discovery Kids
- Nickelodeon
- Nickelodeon Sonic
- Pogo Tv
- Cartoon Network
- Gubbare Tv
- Sony Yay
- Sony Sports Ten 1
- Sony Sports Ten 5
- Star Sports 1
- Star Sports 3
- Star Sports Select 1

== Upcoming channels ==
Name	Genre	Launching date	SD/HD availability	Owner	Note
M5 News	TBA	News	SD	Bizz News Private Limited	
NDTV Malayalam	TBA	News	SD	NDTV	
Zee Malayalam News	TBA	News	SD	Essel Group	Launched on 25 January 2022 on digital platforms
Surya Movies HD	TBA	Movie	HD	Sun TV Network	

== Cable TV channels ==
These channels do not have MIB permission for satellite up-linking or down-linking. They are available only on cable tv networks, not on any DTH platforms.

- ACV
- ACV+
- ACV News
- ACV Movies
- ACV Utsav
- ACV Utsav Plus
- Asianet Teleshop
- Jukebox
- Medley
- Rosebowl
- ComX TV
- ADN Gold
- KV Talkies
- KV Beasts
- Kerala Vision News

== International channels ==
These channels mainly for Malayali people residing outside India. These channels have permission to Uplink from India, but no downlink permission from India.

- Asianet Middle East - GEC from Disney Star
- Butterfly TV - GEC started by Gulf Malayalees, first Indian channel to launch in Qatar
- Flowers TV USA - GEC from Insight Media City
- Mazhavil Manorama International - GEC from Malayala Manorama (MM) TV Ltd
- Media One Gulf - GEC from Madhyamam Broadcasting Ltd
- Kairali Arabia - GEC from Malayalam Communications Limited
- UBL HD - GEC from United Arab Emirates, available through E-Vision and online
- NTV HD - GEC from United Arab Emirates, available through E-Vision
- Anand TV

== Defunct channels ==
- Asianet Global - later rebranded as Asianet News.
- Indiavision - Malayalam news channel from Indiavision Satellite Communications.
- Kairali People TV - Later rebranded as Kairali News.
- Kiran TV - replaced by Surya Movies
  - Surya Movies - rebranded as Sun Surya Movies
- Surya Action - replaced by Surya Comedy
  - Surya Comedy - rebranded as Sun Surya Comedy
- Surya TV - rebranded as Sun Surya
- Surya Music - rebranded as Sun Surya Music
- TV New - Malayalam news channel from the Kerala Chamber of Commerce and Industry (KCCI)
- Yes Indiavision - youth entertainment channel from Indiavision
- MiddleEast Entertainment Television (ME TV)
- Bharath TV - GEC from Bharatheeya Cable Vision Ltd
- Prabhatham News 3D - Claimed as First 3D News channel in India.[Fake]
- SS Entertainment
- Today TV
- Dakshin TV - a movie channel.
- Mangalam TV - a news channel.
- Yogi TV Malayalam
- Athmeeya Yathra - spiritual channel.

== See also ==
- List of Malayalam-language radio stations
- List of Tamil language television channels
- List of Telugu language television channels
- List of Kannada language television channels
