= Kerala Board of Public Examination =

State education board of Kerala, India

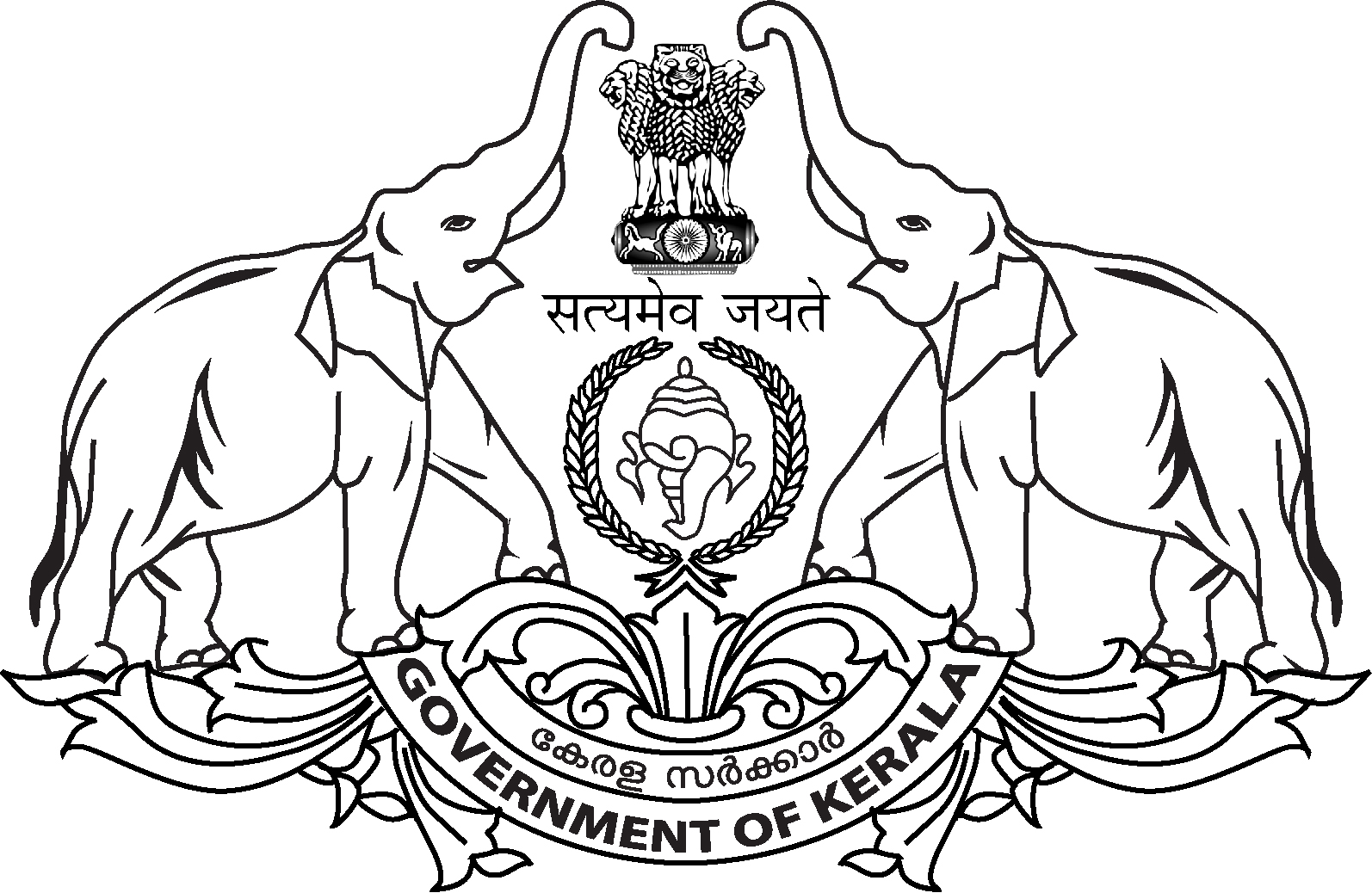
- Abbreviation: KBPE
- Formation: 1965; 61 years ago
- Type: State Governmental Board of Education
- Headquarters: Poojappura, Thiruvananthapuram, Kerala, India
- Official language: Malayalam, English
- Chairman: V. Sivankutty (Minister for General Education)
- Vice Chairman: A. P. M. Mohammad Hanish IAS (Principal Secretary to Govt)
- Director: N S K Umesh IAS (Director of General Education)
- Parent organization: Department of General Education, Government of Kerala
- Website: pareekshabhavan.kerala.gov.in

Kerala Board of Public Examination is the state level education board of Kerala. It is administered by the Government of Kerala. The board is responsible for conducting various examinations on the basis of a unified law. Its headquarters are located at Pareeksha Bhavan, Poojappura, Thiruvananthapuram. The board is responsible for conducting the Secondary School Leaving Certificate (SSLC), Technical High School Leaving Certificate (THSLC) Examinations in the state of Kerala.

== Affiliations ==
There are more than 12,644 schools affiliated to Kerala Board of Public examination out of which 4504 are government schools, 7277 are aided schools and 863 are unaided schools.

== Structure ==
The structure is divided into:

- kindergarten (LKG and UKG)
- LP (Primary School/Lower primary, classes/standard 1–5)
- UP (Middle School/upper primary, classes/standard 6–8)
- HS (High/ Secondary School, classes/standard 9–10)
- Higher Secondary (11- 12)

Usually, the whole system of KG, LP, UP and HS are collectively referred as High School. Students completing this complete course (12 years including KGs, which is optional* and otherwise 10 years of education) will be awarded with School Leaving Certificate, abbreviated as SSLC. Based on the results in SSLC, students are enrolled into Higher Secondary Education (HSE) which was previously known as pre-degree and was conducted in colleges.

Now, HSE is integrated to the school system and most educational institutions now offer classes from LKG to +2. Higher secondary offers a wide range of subjects according to the candidate's preference. After completing +2, students are awarded with a HSE certificate given by the Board of Higher Secondary Education, Kerala under DHSE which is a passport to degree and similar courses.

== Grading ==
=== SSLC ===
The SSLC exam conducted at the end of Class 10 is based on a 9-point grading system ranging from A+ to E.

==== KBPE grading system ====
Grade	Percentage	Grade Value	Grade Position
A+	90–100%	9	Outstanding
A	80–89%	8	Excellent
B+	70–79%	7	Very Good
B	60–69%	6	Good
C+	50–59%	5	Above Average
C	40–49%	4	Average
D+	30–39%	3	Marginal
D	20–29%	2	Need Improvement
E	Less than 20%	1	Need Improvement

== See also ==
- Kerala Board of Higher Secondary Examinations
- Department of General and Higher Education (Kerala)
