= Government Victoria College, Palakkad =

College in Palakkad, Kerala, India

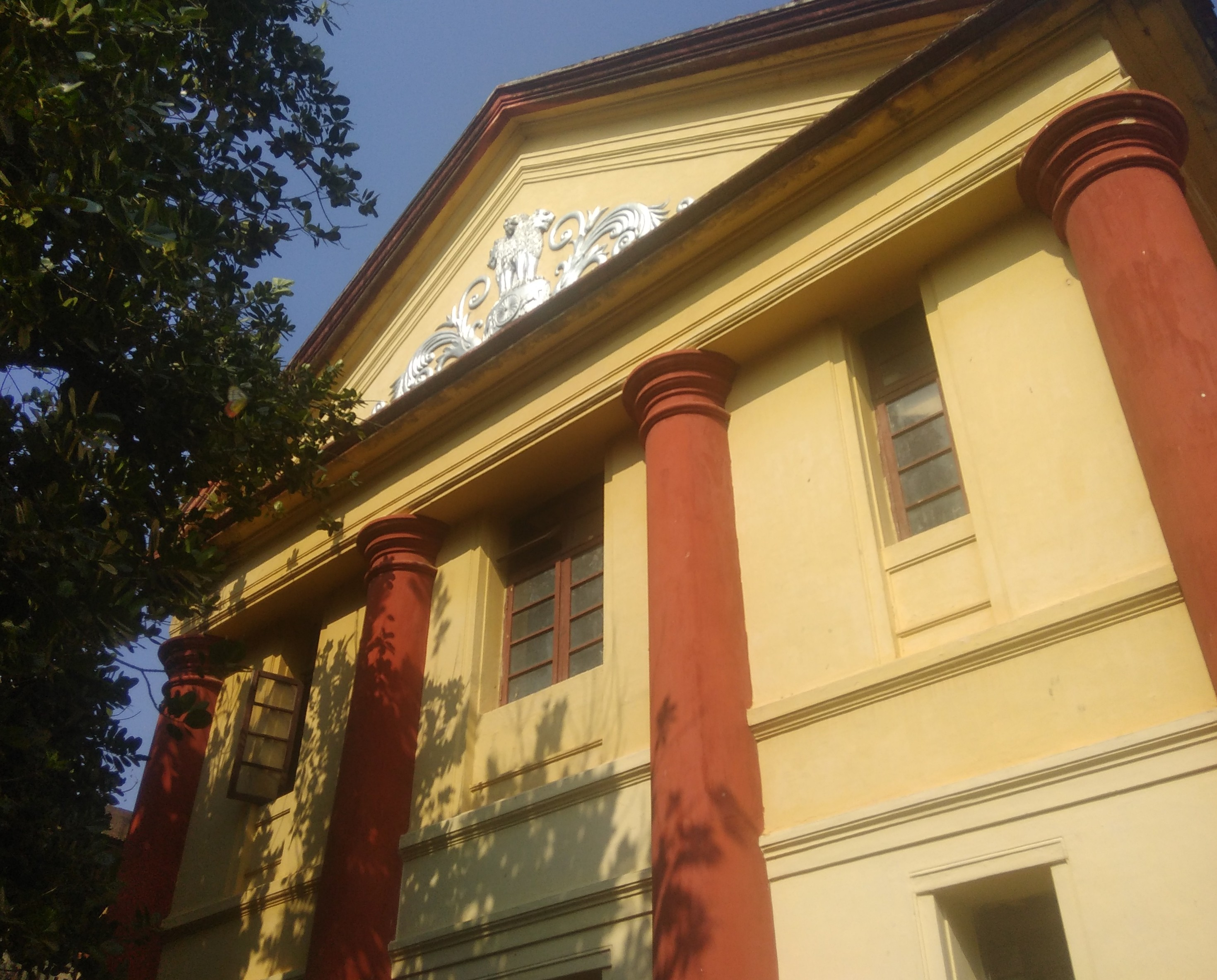
- Motto: Labunter et imputatur
- Type: Government College
- Established: 1888; 138 years ago
- Affiliations: University of Calicut
- Principal: Sindhu S. L. (I/C)
- Location: Palakkad, Kerala, 678001, India; 10.7844°N 76.6520°E
- Campus: Urban, 25 Acres
- Language: English
- Administration: Department of Higher Education, Government of Kerala
- Website: www.gvc.ac.in
- Location in Kerala Government Victoria College, Palakkad (India)

The Government Victoria College in Palakkad is an institution of higher learning in the Malabar region of Kerala. It is affiliated to the Calicut University and provides undergraduate and postgraduate education in science, arts and commerce subjects. The college is ranked 84th among colleges in India by the National Institutional Ranking Framework (NIRF) in 2024.

The institution was started in the year 1866.

== Notable alumni ==
- E. M. S. Namboodiripad, communist politician and 1st Chief Minister of Kerala
- V. R. Krishna Iyer, former Supreme Court judge, former minister
- M. T. Vasudevan Nair, writer and filmmaker
- O. V. Vijayan, author and cartoonist
- T. N. Seshan, former Chief Election Commissioner of India
- E. Sreedharan, civil engineer
- Unni Menon, playback singer
- K. N. Panikkar, historian
- Olappamanna, poet
- Ravi Shankar, cartoonist
- C. N. Jayadevan
- Anil Radhakrishnan Menon
- O. Rajagopal
- Mundur Krishnankutty, author
- Mankada Ravi Varma, cinematographer, film director
- Murali Sreeshankar, athlete
- Shyama Prasad, Film Maker
- K. Anvar Sadath Science writer, CEO of KITE
- K. A. Thulasi, Minister Government of Kerala

== Gallery ==
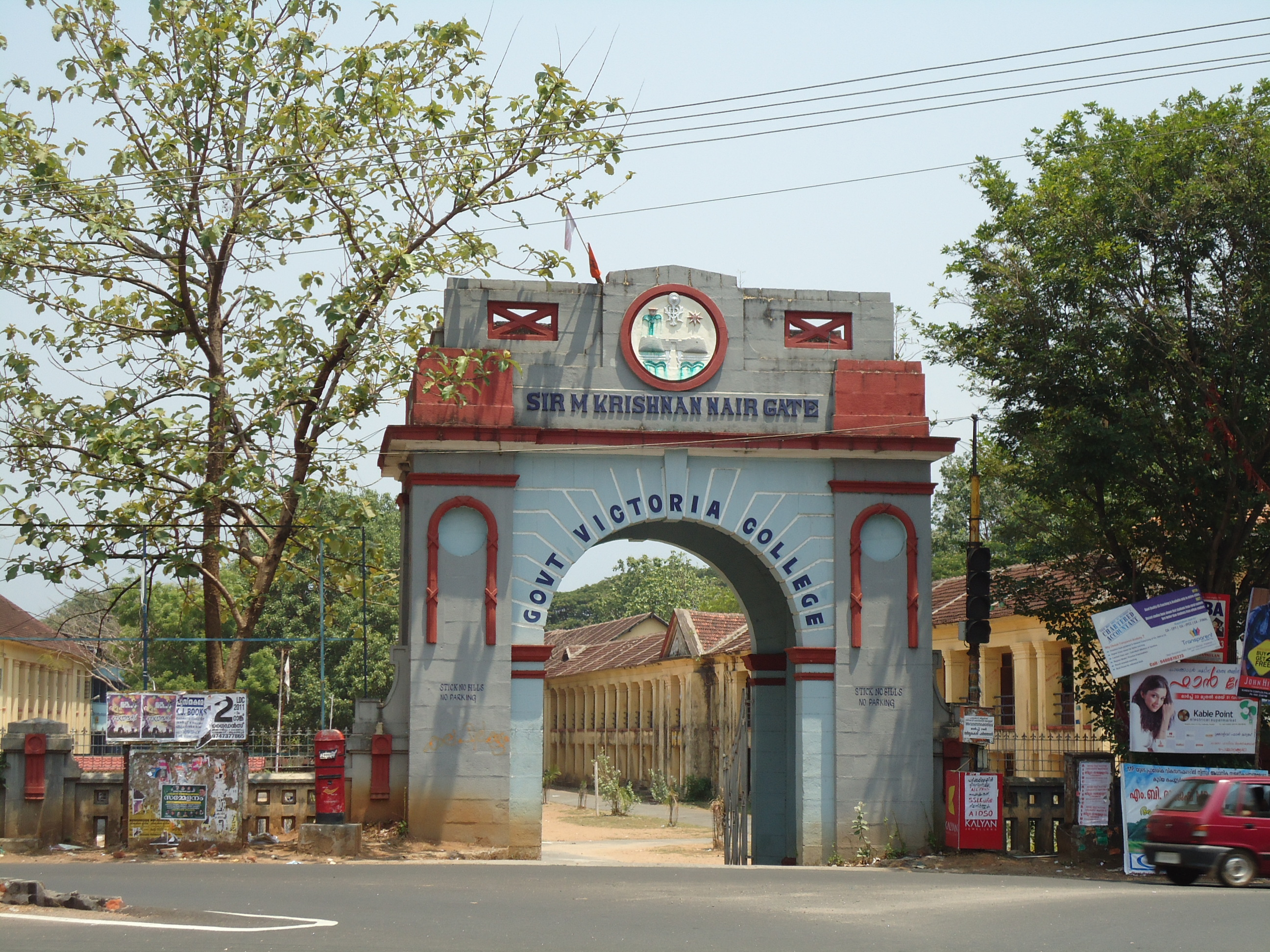
Entrance

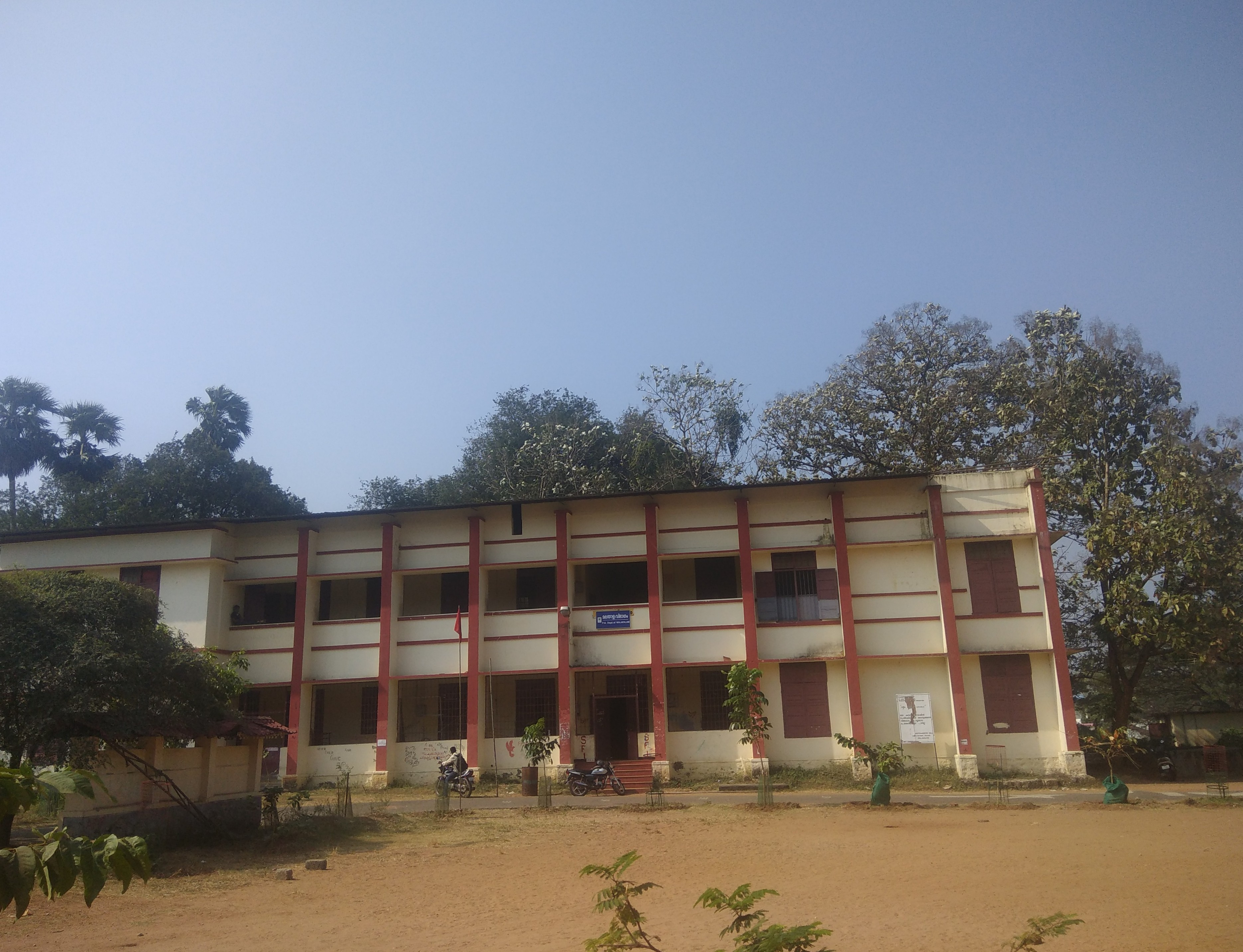
Malayalam department

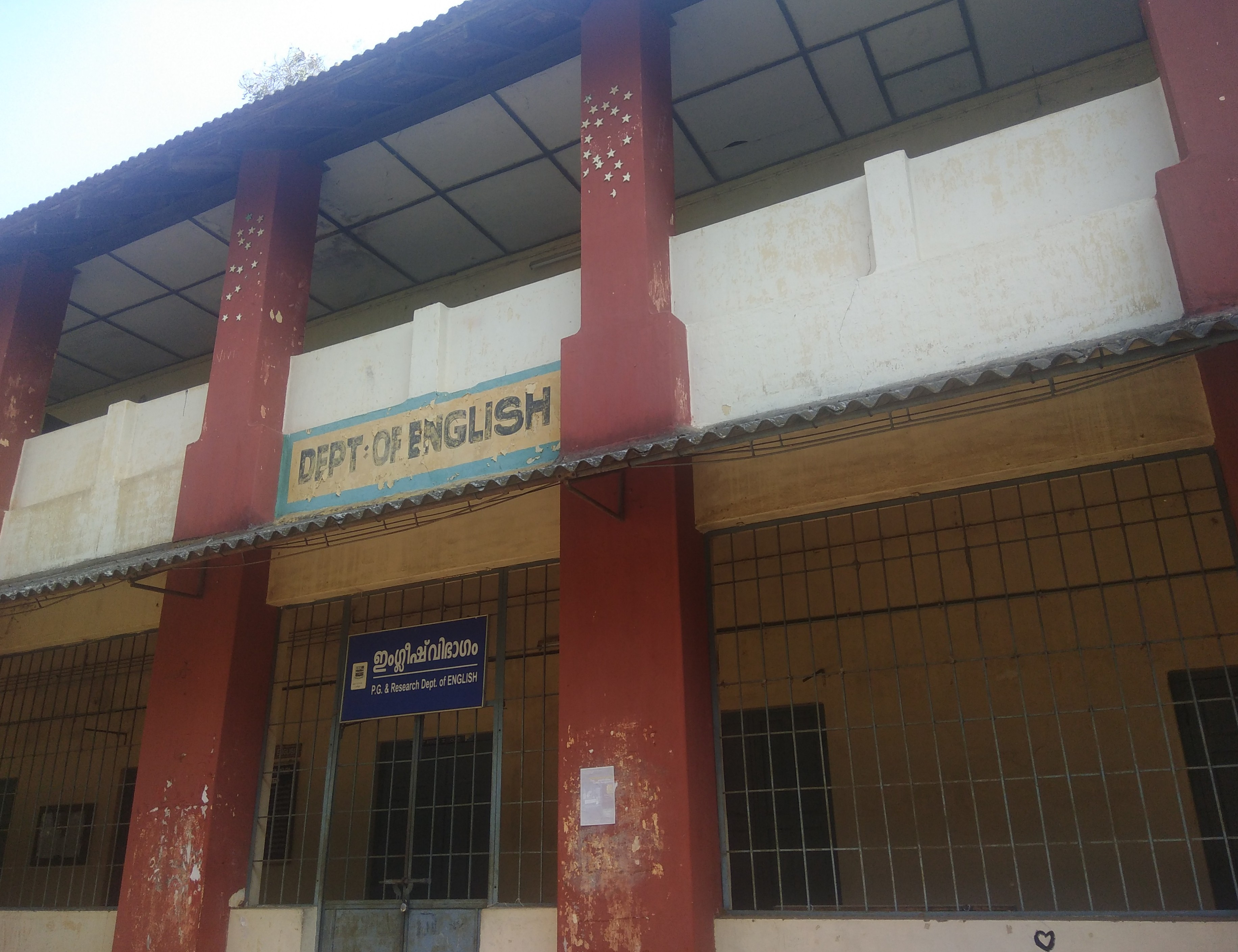
English department

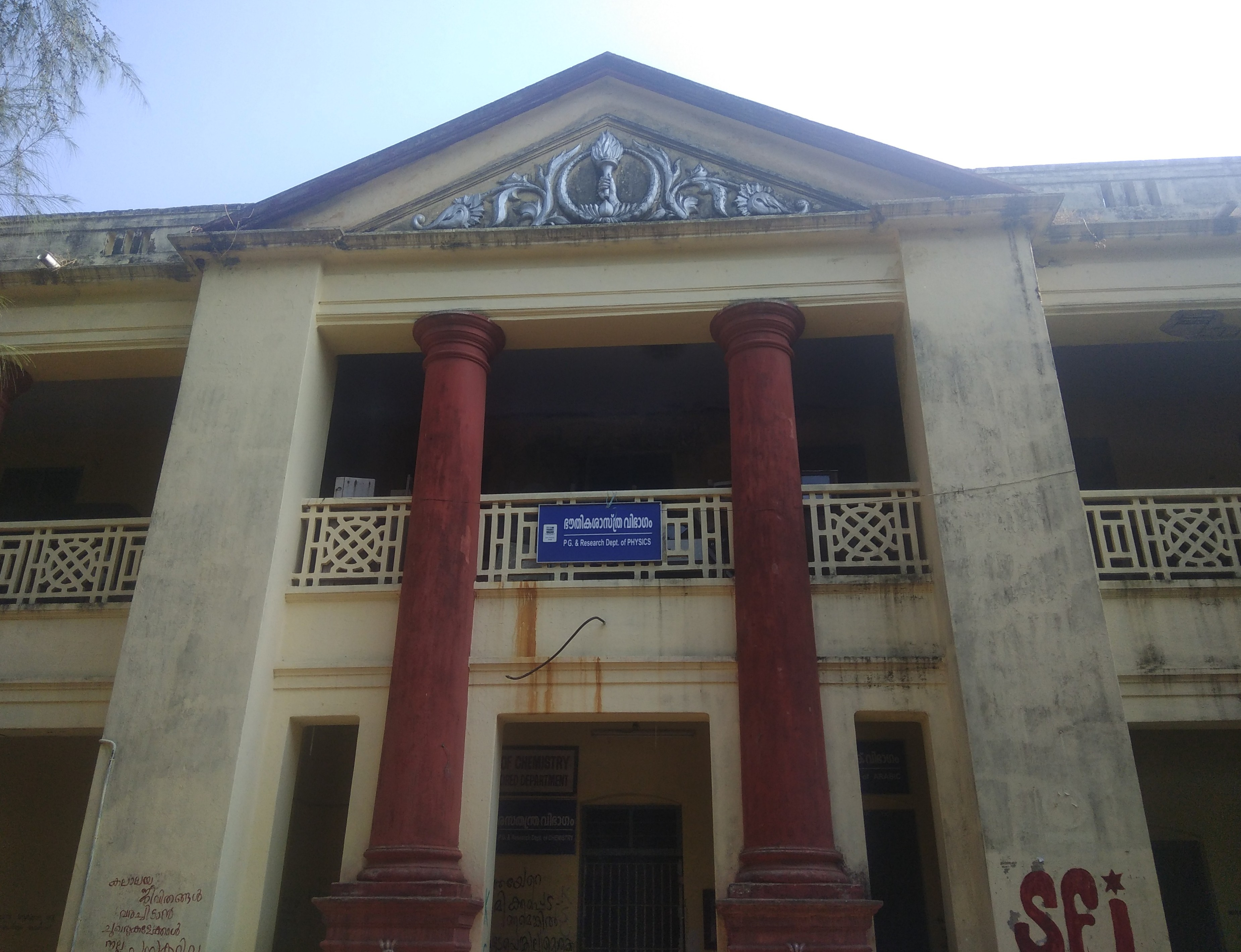
Physics department

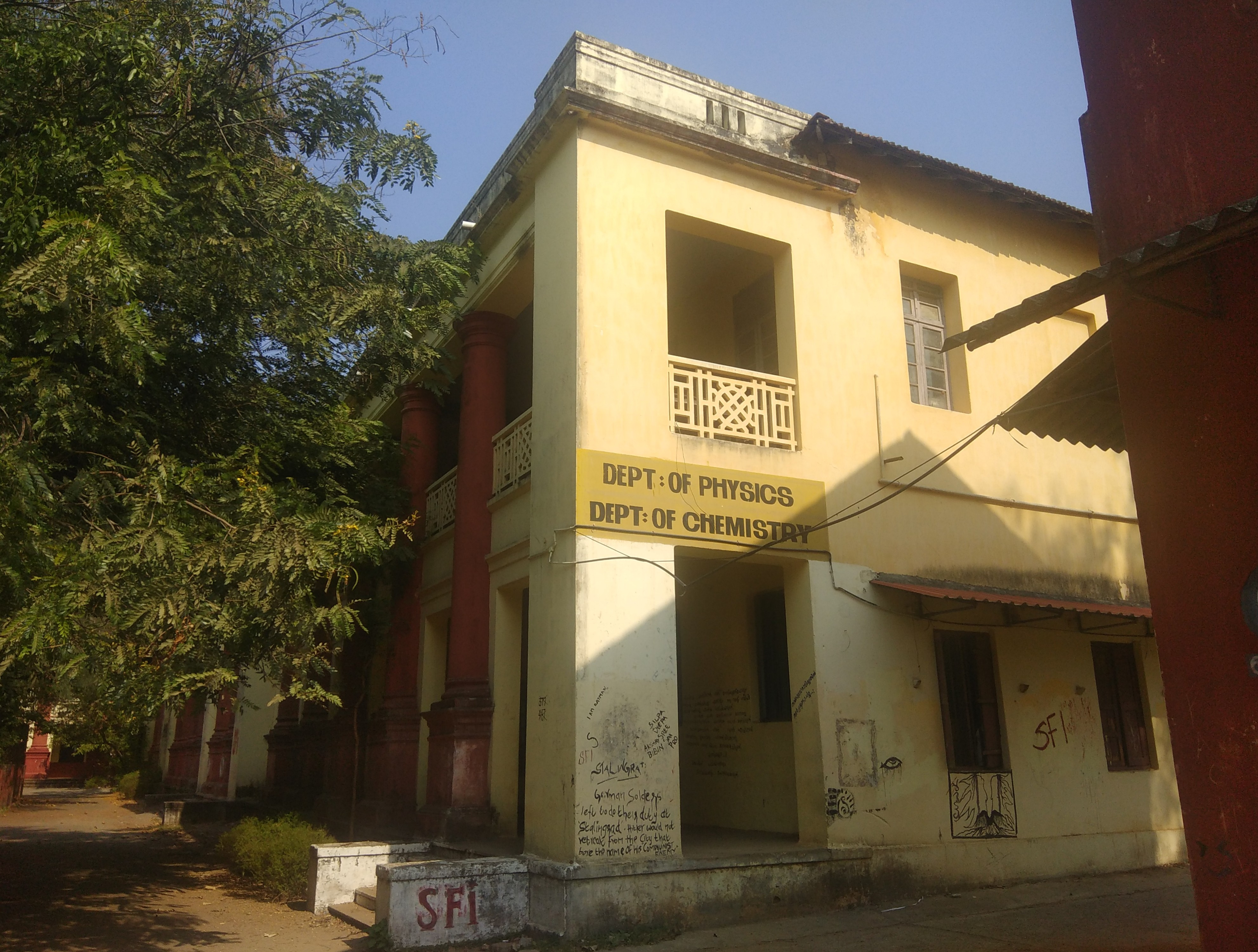
Chemistry department

== See also ==
- List of colleges affiliated to the University of Calicut
- List of educational institutions in Palakkad district
