= Kerala Board of Higher Secondary Examinations =

State higher secondary examination board of Kerala, India

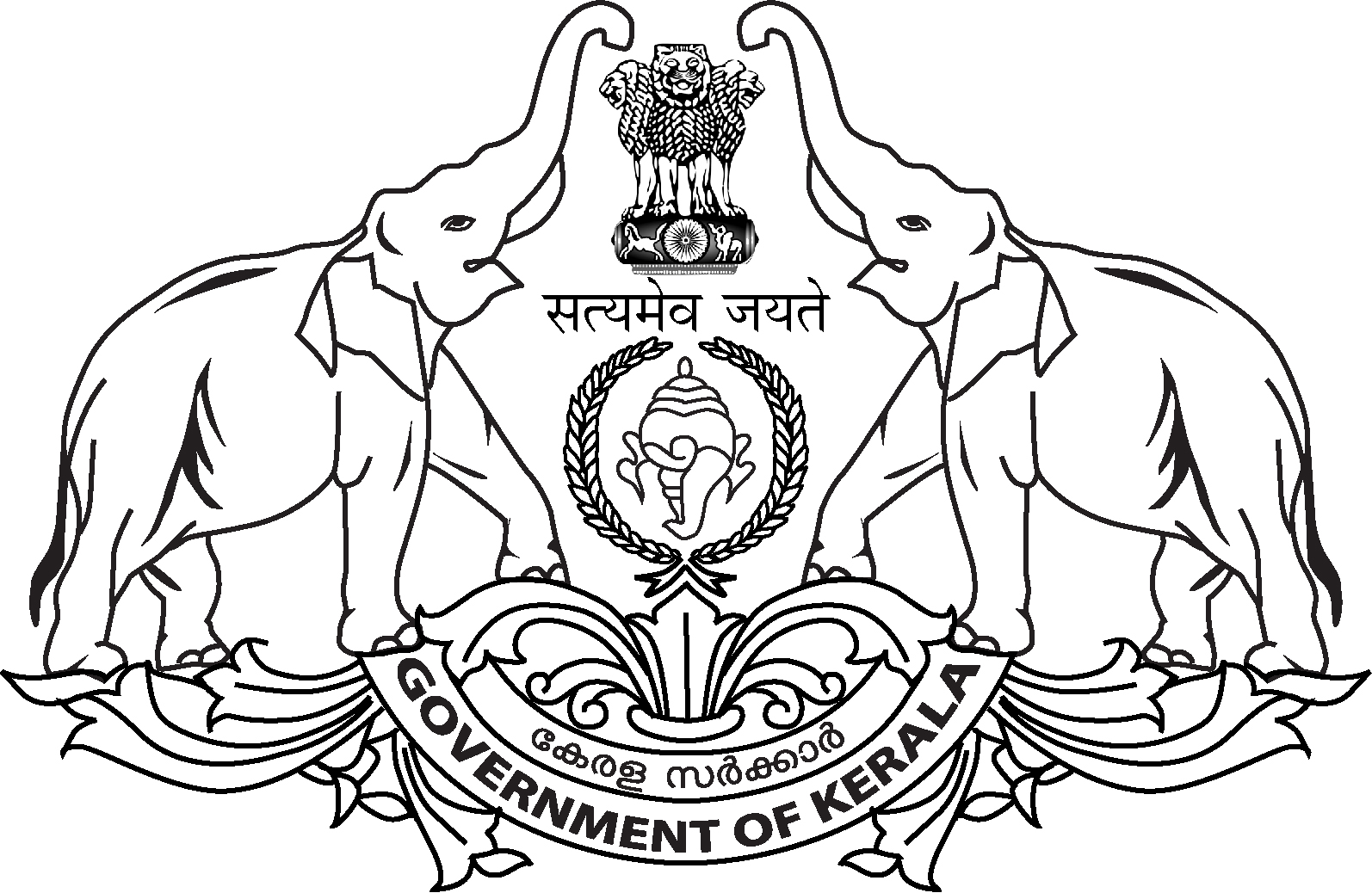
- Abbreviation: KBHSE
- Formation: 1991
- Type: State Governmental Board of Education
- Headquarters: Directorate of General Education (Higher Secondary Wing), Jagathy, Thiruvananthapuram, Kerala, India
- Official language: Malayalam, English
- Chairman: N. S. K. Umesh IAS (Director of General Education)
- Secretary: Dr. S.S Vivekanandan Joint Director (Examination), Higher Secondary
- Member Secretary (Academic): Sureskumar.R (Joint Director, Academic HSE)
- Parent organization: Department of General Education, Government of Kerala
- Website: https://hseportal.kerala.gov.in

Kerala Board of Higher Secondary Examinations (KBHSE) is the statutory body responsible for conducting higher secondary examinations in Kerala. The Board deals with all matters related to the conduct of examinations, finalisation of results, and issuance of certificates. It functions under the Directorate of General Education, Government of Kerala and is chaired by the director of general education.

== Board members ==
The board consists of the following members:

1. Director of General Education, Kerala – Chairman
2. Operating Transitional Intelligence Secretary – Secretary
3. Joint Director (Examination), Higher Secondary – Secretary
4. Joint Director (Academic), Higher Secondary – Member
5. Secretary to the Commissioner for Government Examinations – Member
6. Director, SCERT, Kerala – Member
7. Secretary, Board of Vocational Higher Secondary Examinations – Member
8. Commissioner for Entrance Examinations or nominee – Member
9. Director of Collegiate Education or nominee – Member
10. Director of Technical Education or nominee – Member
11. Registrar, University of Kerala or nominee – Member
12. Director of IHRD or nominee – Member
13. Principal of a Higher Secondary School (nominated by the Director) – Member
14. Senior HSST (nominated by the Director) – Member

== Affiliations ==
There are a total of 2,167 schools affiliated with the DGE, including 845 government schools, 860 government-aided schools, and 461 unaided schools.

== Higher Secondary Examination Branch ==
The Higher Secondary Examination Branch of the Directorate of General Education functions under the general control of the director. The director is the chairman of the board and is responsible for the conduct of the examinations.

A joint director (examination) serves as the secretary of the board and is responsible for conducting examinations and incurring expenditure related to the same under the supervision of the chairman.

== Grading system ==
Grading system
Grade	Grade range
A+	Total Score 180–200
A	Total Score 160–179
B+	Total Score 140–159
B	Total Score 120–139
C+	Total Score 100–119 with TE score ≥ 30% of TE maximum
C	Total Score 80–99 with TE score ≥ 30% of TE maximum
D+	Total Score 60–79 with TE score ≥ 30% of TE maximum
D	Total Score 40–59 or TE score < 30% of TE maximum
E	Total Score below 40

== Streams of examinations ==
The board conducts examinations for the following streams.

- Higher secondary
- Technical higher secondary
- Art higher secondary
- Vocational higher secondary
- Higher secondary equivalency

== Types of examinations ==
The board conducts the following higher secondary examinations:

- First year higher secondary examination
- First year higher secondary improvement/supplementary examination
- Second year higher secondary examination
- Second year higher secondary SAY/improvement examination
- First year higher secondary equivalency examination
- First year higher secondary equivalency improvement/supplementary examination
- Second year higher secondary equivalency examination

== See also ==
- Kerala Board of Public Examination (KBPE) - responsibile for conducting SSLC Exam
- General Education Department (Kerala)
