= Directorate of General Education (Higher Secondary Wing) =

Regulatory body of higher secondary schools in Kerala

The Directorate of General Education (Higher Secondary Wing), formerly the Directorate of Higher Secondary Education (DHSE), is the regulatory body of higher secondary schools in Kerala. It was formed in 1990 to reorganize secondary and collegiate education in the Indian state of Kerala. The board provides Higher Secondary Examination and offers courses in science, humanities and commerce.

== See also ==
- Department of General Education (Kerala)
- Education in Kerala
- List of institutions of higher education in Kerala
- SSLC
