= Kerala State Literacy Mission Authority =

Literacy mission by Government of Kerala

- Abbreviation: KSLMA
- Formation: 26 October 1998; 27 years ago
- Founded at: Thiruvananthapuram
- Headquarters: Pettah
- Location: Thiruvananthapuram, India
- Region served: Kerala
- Services: Basic literacy programmes; Equivalency programmes
- Chairman: Pinarayi Vijayan
- Vice Chairman: V. Sivankutty
- Principal Secretary: Rani George IAS
- Director: A. G. Oleena
- Parent organization: Department of General Education, Government of Kerala
- Website: literacymissionkerala.org

The Kerala State Literacy Mission Authority is an autonomous institution under the Department of General Education, Government of Kerala. It was set up in 1998 for the purpose of co-ordinating and activating the Literacy and continuing education activities launched by the National Literacy Mission, Ministry of Education, Government of India. Its headquarters is in Thiruvananthapuram.

Kerala launched the continuing education endeavour on 26 October 1998 propagating the slogan Education for all and Education for ever six years after it bagged the envious title of total literacy. Presently the KSLMA is fully funded by the Government of Kerala in order to implement literacy, continuing education and lifelong learning programme designed and developed by the state. The District Literacy Missions are looking after the activities at the district level. The Continuing Education Centers functioning under the local self government institutions spread across the state are the service delivery unit of the mission.

In 2021, Kerala has been included in the Union government's new literacy scheme Padhna Likhna Abhiyan (Read and Write Campaign), the scheme of adult education, that aims at total literacy in the country by 2030.

== Services ==
=== Basic programme ===
Eventhough Kerala achieved total literacy, illiteracy still continues and the illiterates mostly concentrated in coastal and tribal areas. KSLMA envisaged Basic Literacy Programmes for eradicating illiteracy prevails in the state.

Complete literacy

The KSLMA's Paripoorna Saksharat (complete literacy) mission is working towards complete literacy in the state through a multipronged strategy, including survey in areas with low access to education and classes for illiterates. As per the 2011 census, there were around 18.5 lakh illiterate people and 12 lakh neo literates in the state. A model survey been conducted in one panchayat in each district. It will be extended to all panchayats. The aim of the mission is to make the state fully literate in four years. special literacy drive being implemented in Coastal areas and tribal colonies to find out the number of illiterate persons.

Aksharasagaram

KSLMA embarks on a literacy programme in the coastal areas of the state named Aksharasagaram, the project is being funded by the government of Kerala's Department of Fisheries to improve the literacy rate in coastal areas where education generally takes a back seat. The first phase of the project been completed in Thiruvananthapuram, Malappuram and Kasaragod districts where the literacy rates are the lowest. The second phase focusing on coastal areas has been launched in Kollam, Ernakulam and Kozhikode districts. The second phase would cover 234 gram panchayat wards in 36 local bodies spread across the three districts. In the third phase, coastal villages in Kannur, Thrisuur and Alappuzha districts were covered. The project was rolled out in 138 coastal wards falling under 41 local bodies in three districts. This includes 13 local bodies each in Kannur and Alappuzha and 15 in Thrissur.

Total literacy programme for Tribals

KSLMA launched a project to impart literacy in 100 selected tribal settlements across the state. The project to be implemented in association with the Scheduled Tribe Development Department, envisages setting up of special literacy centres in tribal settlements with low literacy rate. Qualified persons from the tribal community will be appointed as instructors of the literacy programme. The statewide rollout of the programme is part of literacy missions task of eradicating illiteracy from all tribal settlements in a phased manner.

Wayanad Tribal Literacy Project

A KSLMA survey identified 9,751 illiterat people from Wayanad's tribal community. Around 300 literacy centres were launched in the district and 600 instructors were identified and trained. It was also ensured of the two instructors deployed for each centre, one will be from the tribal community.

Attappadi Tribal Literacy Programme

This programme was successful in imparting literacy to 1,127 tribals spread across 63 settlements in Attappadi.

Jail Jyothi Project

The Kerala Prisons and Correctional Services launched a programme named Jail Jyothi – jails without illiterates, to ensure total literacy among inmates in prisons in Kerala. It is estimated that nearly 1000 out of the 7000-odd inmates in 53 jails across the state were illiterate. The first examination was attended by a total of 297 Jain inmates. The KSLMA has established a study centre at the Poojappura Central Prison, the first such facility for prisoners in the State. The permanent facility, which will have dedicated instructors, will enable prison inmates to register for KSLMA's classes 10 and 12 equivalency courses.

=== Equivalency programme ===
The state sponsored lifelong learning programme is concentrated on the equivalency programme at the four levels; 4th, 7th, 10th, 11th and 12th standard equivalency.

=== Other projects ===
Changathi

Changathi (Friend) is a literacy programme for migrant labourers. Hamari Malayalam (Our Malayalam), the textbook has been launched by the then Minister for Education C. Raveendranath at Perumbavoor. The book has 25 chapters dealing with various topics ranging from hygiene, health and technology to rights of workers and ethical values.

Continuing education programme for Transgender people

Kerala being the first state to implement Transgender policy, KSLMA along with Ministry of Social Justice and Empowerment has rolled out a continuing education programme called Samanwaya. It was launched in 2017 with an aim to provide free education for transgender people.

== See also ==
- Education in Kerala
