= K. Anvar Sadath =

Indian science writer

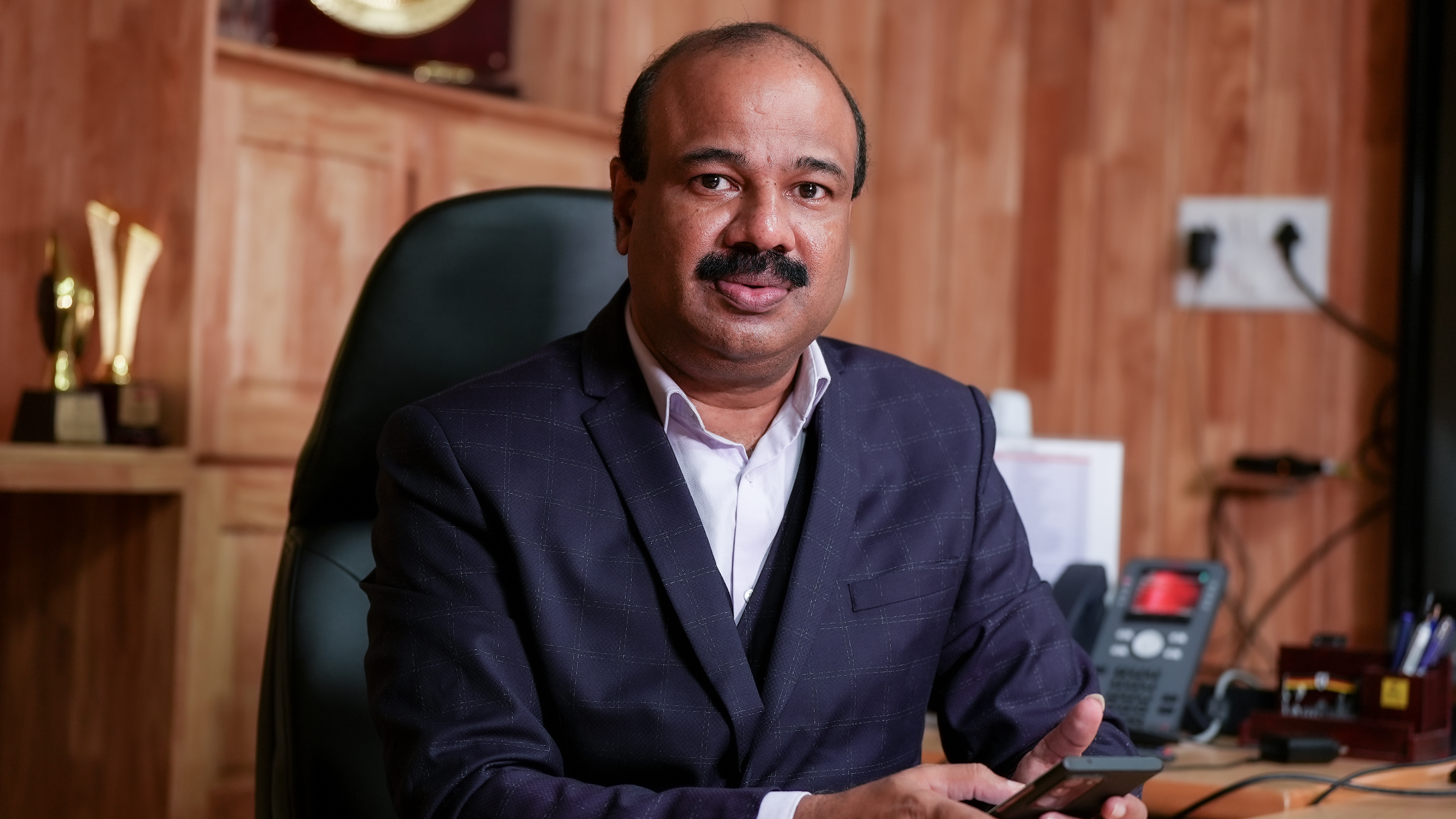
- Anvar Sadath in 2023
- Born: K. Anvar Sadath; 24 September 1973 (age 53); Malappuram, Malappuram district, Kerala), India
- Office: State Office. KITE IT Division, Poojapura. Thiruvananthapuram
- Awards: AECT's International Contributions Award

K. Anvar Sadath (born 24 September 1973) is a Malayalam science writer and the Chief Executive Officer (CEO) of Kerala Infrastructure and Technology for Education (KITE), a state-owned company in Kerala, India. Anwar received AECT's International Contributions Award for his contributions to the field of digital education.

== Early life and education ==
Anwar was born on September 24, 1973, in Karuvarakundu, Malappuram district, Kerala. He studied physics in Government Victoria College, Palakkad, and got MCA (Master of Computer Applications) from Government Engineering College, Thiruvananthapuram.

== Career ==
Anwar has worked at the Centre for Development of Advanced Computing (C-DAC), Information Kerala Mission and the Kerala State IT Mission. He is the Executive Director of IT @ School Project in Kerala. which was operated under the Education Department of Kerala.

He later joined as CEO of Kerala Infrastructure and Technology for Education. Some of his major work include starting 45,000 high-tech classrooms in Kerala, setting up 16,000 high-tech labs in schools, starting School Wiki, Samagra resource portal, "First Bell", digital classes for students in Kerala etc.

== Published books ==
- Internet Prayogavum Sadhyathayum
- Cyber crime and Indian cyber rule
- Nano technology: athisookshmathalathile sadyathayam prayogavum
- The tech world closer look

== Awards ==
- 2005: Award for Best Science Writing from the Kerala State Council for Science, Technology and Environment.
- 2012: Dr. C. P. Menon Memorial Award for Best Science Book.
- 2022: Prof. N. A. Kareem Award from the Vakkam Moulavi Foundation Trust for his contributions to the field of digital education.
- AECT International Award: He received an international award from the Association for Educational Communications and Technology (AECT) for his contributions to the field of digital education.
