= Harvest TV =

Indian Malayalam-language television channel

- Logo used since 2011
- Country: India
- Headquarters: Thiruvananthapuram

Programming
- Language: Malayalam
- Picture format: 576i SDTV

Ownership
- Owner: Bibi George Chacko

History
- Launched: 2011; 15 years ago
- Founder: Bibi George Chacko

Links
- Website: www.harvesttv.in

Harvest TV is an Indian malayalam language free to air Christian devotional satellite channel in Malayalam language, owned By Bibi George Chacko. Harvest TV started as a cable TV channel in 2011 in Thiruvananthapuram, Kerala. By 2013, Harvest TV started telecasting on various DTH networks.

Harvest TV is currently available on Roku, Amazon Firestick, 121TV, and is coming soon on Tizen and Google Store
