= Secondary School Leaving Certificate =

Certification of completion issued by Indian secondary schools

- Acronym: SSLC
- Type: Pen and Paper Based Examination
- Administrator: All Indian States And Union Territories Examination Boards
- Purpose: Admission to Intermediate Colleges
- Restrictions on attempts: twice in one year
- Regions: India
- Languages: Including Hindi and All Indian Languages

The Secondary School Leaving Certificate (commonly referred to as SSLC) is a certification obtained by a student on successful completion of an examination at the end of study at the secondary schooling level in India. The SSLC is obtained on passing the grade 10 public examination, which is commonly referred to as 'class 10 board examinations' in India. SSLC is a common eligibility examination popular in many states in India, especially Kerala, Karnataka, and Tamil Nadu. The SSLC is also called Secondary School Certificate (SSC) in Andhra Pradesh, Telangana, Maharashtra and also as High School Certificate (HSC) in Madhya Pradesh and also as Matriculation in many states of India.

== Relevance ==
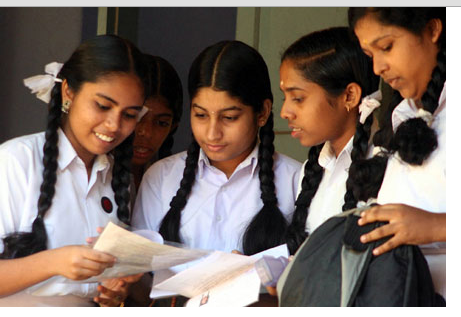
SSLC students evaluating a question paper after their examination.

A SSLC marks card (2001) in Karnataka

The Indian system of education fundamentally consists of five years of primary schooling, followed by five years of secondary schooling. The SSLC must be obtained at the end of term of study at the secondary school. SSLC is obtained after the student scores 35% and above in his/her Xth Board Exams.

On obtaining this certificate, the student is deemed to have completed secondary schooling. After successful completion of SSLC, Students will further pursue their higher secondary education i.e. Class 11th and Class 12th by either attending a Junior College or by continuing High School in one of three streams – Science, Commerce or Arts. After this students will pursue their undergraduate studies in desired universities of their choice.

Alternatively, after obtaining the SSLC, a student may choose to attend an industrial training institute where one can be trained in skills necessary for technical occupations. The other options include joining polytechnic for a three-year course of diploma in engineering and then further pursuing degree in engineering. After completing SSLC there is an option of joining vocational education courses. SSLC (or equivalent) is required nowadays to obtain a passport under Indian government for employment purposes.

== Importance ==
The SSLC certificate was used as the primary form of proof for date of birth during the time when registration of births and deaths was not mandatory in India. It is still a valid form of proof of date of birth for those born before 1989 according to the MEA website for the Indian civil authorities to issue civil documents such as passports. It is also a proof of eligibility for higher studies. If caste is denoted in the SSLC certificate it can also be used as a substitute of the caste certificate issued by Village Officer/Tahasildar in some states of India.

== Grading ==
Students require a minimum mark of 30% in each subject to qualify Kerala board SSLC exams. The total duration of Kerala SSLC exam 2022 is 2 hr 45 mins for 100 marks exam and 1 hr 45 mins for 50 marks subject.

Total Marks in Theory and CCE
Subjects	Score for CCE	Score for Written Examination
First Language	20	80
English	20	80
Hindi	10	40
Social Science	20	80
Physics	10	40
Chemistry	10	40
Biology	10	40
Mathematics	20	80
Information Technology	10+20 (Practical)	10

Unfortunately, only the grades are given and the marklist can only be acquired by applying to "Pareekshabhavan" either by post or through this government site .

To know your percentage and your eligibility for higher studies without doing tedious calculations, you can use this opensource site.

== See also ==
- Central Board of Secondary Education (CBSE), India
- National Institute of Open Schooling (NIOS), India
- Council for the Indian School Certificate Examinations (CISCE), India
- Kerala Board of Public Examination (KBPE), India
- State Board of School Examinations (Sec.) & Board of Higher Secondary Examinations, Tamil Nadu (SBSEBHSE), India
