= TV New =

Indian Malayalam-language television channel

- Country: India
- Network: India Middle East Broadcasting Network Pvt. Ltd.
- Headquarters: Kochi, Kerala, India

Programming
- Language(s): Malayalam

Ownership
- Owner: Kerala Chamber of Commerce and Industry.

History
- Launched: 2014 July; 11 years ago

TV New was an Indian television channel broadcasting in Malayalam, a brain child of Kerala Chamber of Commerce and Industry (KCCI). The headquarters is located at Padivattom, Kochi, Kerala, India.

The KCCI along with India Middle East Broadcasting Network started TV New. TV New mainly focuses on news and current affairs with special emphasis on business, knowledge and economical development of state.
