= GSAT-3 =

Indian communications satellite

Coordinates: 0°N 74°E

- Mission type: Communication satellite
- Operator: ISRO
- COSPAR ID: 2004-036A
- SATCAT no.: 28417
- Website: www.isro.gov.in
- Mission duration: 7 years planned 6 years achieved

Spacecraft properties
- Bus: I-2K
- Manufacturer: ISRO Satellite Centre; Space Applications Centre
- Launch mass: 1,950 kilograms (4,300 lb)
- Power: 2040 watts

Start of mission
- Launch date: 20 September 2004, 10:31:00 UTC
- Rocket: GSLV Mk.I F01
- Launch site: Satish Dhawan FLP
- Contractor: ISRO
- Entered service: 24 September 2004

End of mission
- Disposal: Moved to Graveyard orbit
- Deactivated: 30 September 2010

Orbital parameters
- Reference system: Geocentric
- Regime: Geostationary
- Longitude: 74° East
- Perigee altitude: 36,066 kilometres (22,410 mi)
- Apogee altitude: 36,084 kilometres (22,422 mi)
- Inclination: 2.71 degrees
- Period: 24.17 hours
- Epoch: 14 December 2013, 14:55:38 UTC

GSAT-3, also known as EDUSAT, was a communications satellite which was launched on 20 September 2004 by the Indian Space Research Organisation. EDUSAT is the first Indian satellite built exclusively to serve the educational sector. It is mainly intended to meet the demand for an interactive satellite-based distance education system for the country.

EDUSAT carries five K_{u} band transponders providing spot beams, one K_{u} band transponder providing a national beam and six extended C band transponders providing national coverage beams.

EDUSAT was successfully launched into a Geosynchronous Transfer Orbit (GTO) on the first operational launch of the Geosynchronous Satellite Launch Vehicle, which flew from the First Launch Pad at the Satish Dhawan Space Centre in Sriharikota. EDUSAT was initially placed into a transfer orbit with a perigee of 180 kilometres (110 mi) and an apogee of 35,985 kilometres (22,360 mi) and a period of 10.5 hours, inclined at 19.2 degrees to the equator.

EDUSAT was decommissioned in September 2010 and relocated to a graveyard orbit.

== Launch sequence ==
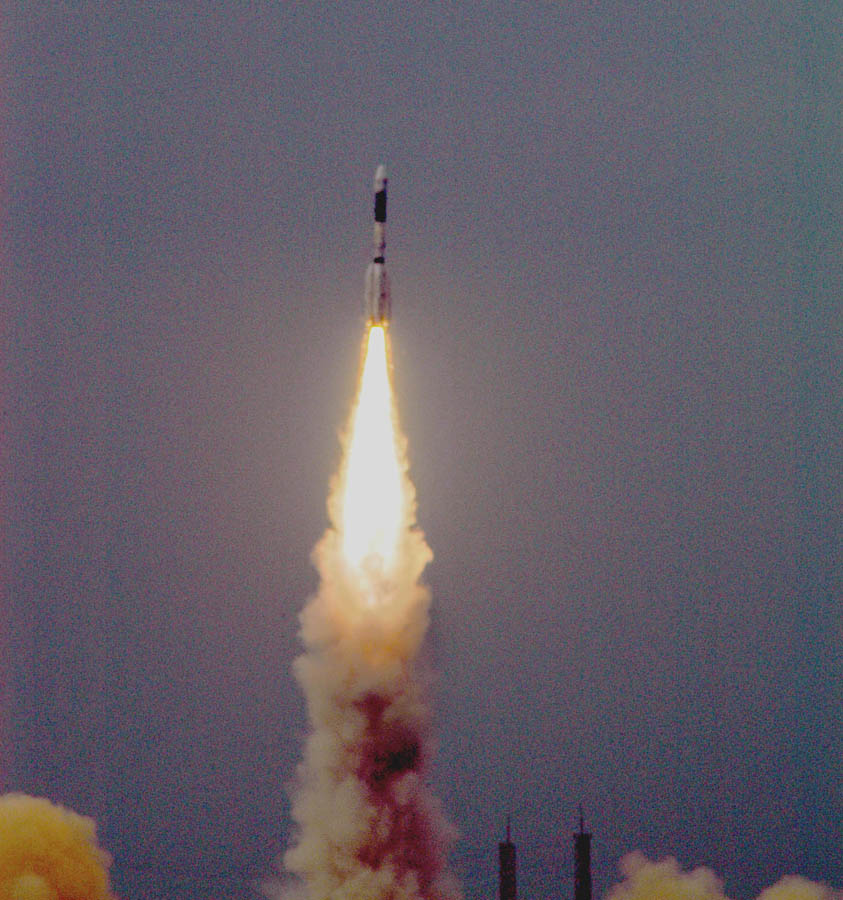
GSLV-F01 Blasting off from the Sathish Dawan Space Centre, Sriharikota, to place EDUSAT- India's first full-fledged educational satellite- in orbit on 20 September 2004

The 414 tonne, 49 m tall GSLV, carrying the 1950 kg GSAT-3, lifted off from Sriharikota at 4:01 pm. About seventeen minutes after lift off, the satellite was successfully placed in GTO. At 4.8 seconds before the countdown reached zero, the four liquid propellant strap-on stages, each carrying 40 tonne of hypergolic liquid propellants (UH25 and N_{2}O_{4}), were ignited. At count zero and after confirming the normal performance of all the four strap-on motors, the 138 tonne solid propellant first stage core motor was ignited and GSLV blazed into the sky. The major phases of the flight included the first stage burn-out at 104 seconds, the strap on burn-out at 150 seconds, ignition of the second stage at 150 seconds, heat shield separation at an altitude of 115 km and 227 seconds into the flight, second stage burn-out at 288 seconds, ignition of the 12.5 tonne cryogenic stage at 304 seconds and its shut down at 999 seconds after attaining the required velocity of 10.2 km per second.

EDUSAT was put into orbit at 1014 seconds about 5000 km away from Sriharikota. The separated cryogenic stage was subsequently reoriented and passivated.

== Solar array deployment ==
Soon after its injection into GTO, the two solar arrays of EDUSAT were automatically deployed. The deployment of the arrays as well as the general health of the satellite were monitored by the ground station of the ISRO Telemetry, Tracking and Command network (ISTRAC) located in the Indonesian island of Biak. The Master Control Facility (MCF) at Hassan in Karnataka has since taken control of EDUSAT for all its post launch operations. Ground stations at Lake Cowichan (Canada), Fucino (Italy) and Beijing (China) are supporting MCF in monitoring the health of the satellite and its orbit raising operations.

Its designated orbital slot is 74 degree East longitude in the Geostationary Orbit. There, it will be co-located with KALPANA-1 and INSAT-3C.

EDUSAT was developed by ISRO Satellite Centre, Bangalore. The payloads were developed by Space Applications Centre, Ahmedabad. Master Control Facility (ISRO) at Hassan is responsible for all post launch operations of the satellite.

== VICTERS ==
India's first broadband network on EDUSAT for schools, VICTERS (Versatile ICT Enabled Resource for Students) inaugurated by Dr. A.P.J Abdul Kalam, former president of India on 28 July 2005 in Thiruvananthapuram has revolutionized classrooms. Through IT@School Project, Kerala has demonstrated how EDUSAT could be used to successfully empower teachers.

== See also ==
- List of Indian satellites
