= General Education Department (Kerala) =

Government body managing education in Kerala, India

Department of General Education

Department overview
- Formed: 1995; 31 years ago
- Preceding Department: Education Department, Government of Kerala
- Jurisdiction: Kerala
- Headquarters: Thiruvananthapuram
- Minister responsible: N. Samsudheen, Minister for General Education and Literacy
- Department executives: Dr. Sharmila Mary Joseph IAS, Additional Chief Secretary; Shri.Snehil Kumar Singh IAS, Director, General Education Department; Dr K MohanaKumar, State Project Director,Samagra Shiksha Keralam(SSK)
- Parent Department: Government of Kerala
- Child agencies: Directorate of General Education; Kerala Infrastructure and Technology for Education (KITE); SCOLE Kerala; SCERT Kerala; SSK; Kerala State Literacy Mission Authority; SIEMAT-Kerala; KBPE; HSE Wing
- Website: https://www.education.kerala.gov.in

The General Education Department, Government of Kerala is the administrative body responsible for overseeing school education in the Indian state of Kerala. Founded in 1995, The department administers and regulate school education from pre-primary level to the higher secondary level and teacher training. The department formulates educational policies, implements government programs, and ensures quality education across the state.

== Organisation ==
=== General Education Department ===
The Department of General Education is a state-level government administrative department in Kerala, entrusted with formulating policies, planning, and implementing various educational programs and initiatives across the state. The Department is headed by the Minister for General Education and is assisted by a senior IAS official designated as the Secretary of General Education. The Principal Secretary/Secretary to the Government functions as the administrative head of the Department and serves as the principal adviser to the Minister for General Education on all matters relating to policy and administration within the Department of General Education.

The current Minister for General Education of Kerala is N. Samsudheen, who has held the office since May 22, 2026, in the First Satheesan ministry

=== Directorate of General Education ===
The Directorate of General Education is an administrative body within the Department of General Education. It is responsible for the day-to-day administration, management, and coordination of general education in Kerala. The Directorate is headed by the Director of General Education, an Indian Administrative Service (IAS) officer, who oversees its functioning and reports to the Secretary of General Education.

The Director of General Education (formerly, the Director of Public Instruction) is the Head of the Department. The Director of General Education is also the Commissioner for Government Examinations in the state. In examination-related activities, he is assisted by the Joint Commissioner, the Secretary, and other staff from the Pareekshabhaven (Office of the Commissioner for Government Examinations).

The Directorate of General Education is made up of the Joint Directors, Regional Deputy Directors, Deputy Directors, and Assistant Directors of Higher Secondary and Vocational Higher Secondary. The department has several Joint Directors who assist the Director in the management and supervision of the department. Each Joint Director is responsible for a specific area, such as primary education, secondary education, or higher secondary education.

The Deputy Directors are responsible for the day-to-day management of the department. They are responsible for implementing policies and programs related to education at the district level.

The Assistant Directors are responsible for the implementation of policies and programs related to education at the school level. They provide technical support to the headmasters and teachers of government schools.

==== Revenue Districts ====
District offices, supervised by Deputy Directors of Education (DDEs), are located in each of the 14 revenue districts for administrative convenience and to increase the effectiveness of school instruction. Each revenue district has Educational Districts and Educational Sub-Districts.There are educational districts and educational sub-districts inside each revenue district, each headed by District Educational Officer (DEO), and Assistant Educational Officer (AEO) respectively.

==== Educational Districts ====
Each educational district is headed by a District Educational Officer (DEO). In the State, 41 Educational District Offices headed by District Educational Officer (DEO) for the administration of High Schools, Training Schools and other special types of schools.

==== Educational Sub-districts ====
In the State, there are 163 educational sub-district offices headed by Assistant Educational Officers (AEO) for the administration of all primary schools within the sub-district. The Assistant Educational Officer (AEO) is responsible for administration and supervision of both upper and lower primary schools.

==== Higher Secondary Wing (DHSE) ====
The Higher Secondary Wing (formerly Directorate of Higher Secondary Education) is a specific division within the Directorate of General Education. It is responsible for overseeing and managing the higher secondary education system in the state. The Higher Secondary Wing focuses on the education provided to students in grades 11 and 12, commonly known as the higher secondary level or pre-university level or plus two level.

==== Vocational Higher Secondary Wing (DVHSE) ====
Vocational Higher Secondary Education Wing is a specialized division within the General Education Directorate that focuses on vocational education at the higher secondary level.

== Bodies/Agencies ==
=== Line Departments/ Directorates ===
- Directorate of General Education (DGE)
  - Directorate of General Education (Higher Secondary Wing) (HSE Wing)
  - Directorate of General Education (Vocational Higher Secondary) (VHSE Wing)

=== Allied institutions / Atteched Offices ===
- Samagra Shiksha Keralam (SSK)
- Kerala Infrastructure and Technology for Education (KITE)
- Kerala State Council for Educational Research and Training (SCERT)
- Kerala State Literacy Mission Authority (KSLMA)
- State Council for Open and Lifelong Education (SCOLE Kerala)
- Kerala Board of Public Examination (KBPE)
- Kerala Board of Higher Secondary Examination (KBHSE)
- Kerala Board of Vocational Higher Secondary Examination (KBVHSE)

=== Heads of Departments (HODs) ===
Heads of Departments under the General Education Department
Designation	Incumbent	Department/Agency	Ref.
Director of General Education	Umesh NSK IAS	Directorate of General Education	
State Project Director, Samagra Shiksha Keralam	Dr K MohanaKumar	Samagra Shiksha Keralam	
Director, SCERT Kerala	Dr Jayaprakash R K	State Council of Educational Research and Training, Kerala	
Chief Executive Officer, KITE	K.Anvar Sadath	Kerala Infrastructure and Technology for Education	
Director, Kerala State Literacy Mission Authority	A .G. Oleena	Kerala State Literacy Mission Authority	
Executive Director, SCOLE Kerala	Dr. Jinesh Kumar Eramam	State Council for Open and Lifelong Education - SCOLE	
Commissioner of Government Examinations, Kerala	Umesh NSK IAS (Director of General Education)	Office of The Commissioner of Government Examinations	

== List of Education Ministers ==
Following is the list of Education Ministers of Kerala before the bifurcation of the Education Department into General Education and Higher Education:

Sl. No.	Minister	Term	Party	Chief Minister
1	Joseph Mundassery	1957–1959	CPI	E. M. S. Namboodiripad
2	P. P. Ummer Koya	1960–1962	INC	Pattom A. Thanu Pillai
3	R. Sankar	1962–1964	INC	R. Sankar
4	C. H. Mohammed Koya	1967–1969	IUML	E. M. S. Namboodiripad
5	C. H. Mohammed Koya	1969–1970	IUML	C. Achutha Menon
6	C. H. Mohammed Koya	1970–1973	IUML	C. Achutha Menon
7	Chakkeeri Ahmed Kutty	1973–1977	IUML	C. Achutha Menon
8	C. H. Mohammed Koya	Mar 1977 – Apr 1977	IUML	K. Karunakaran
9	C. H. Mohammed Koya	1977–1978	IUML	A. K. Antony
10	U. A. Beeran	Jan 1978 – Oct 1978	IUML	A. K. Antony
11	C. H. Mohammed Koya	Oct 1979 – Dec 1979	IUML	C. H. Mohammed Koya
12	Baby John	1980–1981	RSP	E. K. Nayanar
13	P. J. Joseph	1981–1982	Kerala Congress	K. Karunakaran
14	T. M. Jacob	1982–1987	Kerala Congress (Jacob)	K. Karunakaran
15	K. Chandrasekharan	1987–1991	—	E. K. Nayanar
16	E. T. Mohammed Basheer	1991–1995	IUML	K. Karunakaran
17	E. T. Mohammed Basheer	1995–1996	IUML	A. K. Antony
18	P. J. Joseph	1996–2001	Kerala Congress	E. K. Nayanar
19	Nalakath Soopy	2001–2004	IUML	A. K. Antony
20	E. T. Mohammed Basheer	2004–2006	IUML	Oommen Chandy
21	M. A. Baby	2006–2011	CPI(M)	V. S. Achuthanandan
22	P. K. Abdu Rabb	2011–2016	IUML	Oommen Chandy

List of General Education Ministers of Kerala (since bifurcation in 2016)
Sl. No.	Minister	Term	Party	Chief Minister
1	C. Raveendranath	2016–2021	CPI(M)	Pinarayi Vijayan
2	V. Sivankutty	2021–2026	CPI(M)	Pinarayi Vijayan
3	N. Samsudheen	2026–Incumbent	IUML	V.D. Satheesan

== See also ==
- Higher Education Department, Government of Kerala
