= KITE Kerala =

Special-purpose company of the government of Kerala, India

Kerala Infrastructure and Technology for Education (KITE)
- Formerly: IT@School
- Type: SPV
- Industry: Educational
- Founded: 7 August 2017; 9 years ago in Thiruvananthapuram, Kerala, India
- Headquarters: Thiruvananthapuram, Kerala, India
- Area served: Kerala
- Key people: N. Samsudheen (Minister for General Education); Rani George IAS (Chairperson); K. Anvar Sadath (CEO)
- Services: Kite Victers; ICT Enabled Educational Services; KITE GNU-Linux
- Owner: Government of Kerala
- Parent: Department of General Education
- Website: kite.kerala.gov.in

KITE Office Thiruvananthapuram

Kerala Infrastructure and Technology for Education (KITE) is a state owned special purpose company under Department of General Education of the Government of Kerala. It was developed to support ICT enabled education for schools in Kerala. The erstwhile IT@School Project was transformed into KITE for extending its scope of operations in August 2017. KITE was the first SPV (Special Purpose Vehicle) company to get funded by KIIFB (Kerala Infrastructure and Investment Fund Board).

== History ==
IT@School project was established in 2001 and IT campaigns were conducted statewide. Initially, Microsoft had shown interest in the IT@School project, but this was rejected and government went with Free Software. In 2003, IT became a compulsory subject in state school curriculum with IT practical exams. The transition to Free Software was completed in 2006.

In 2017, IT@School project was promoted into a government company named KITE.

== KITE VICTERS ==
New logo of Kite Victers shows the signals pointing to form a pencil implying education, art and sharpness at one point.

KITE is the nodal agency for implementing the EDUSAT network, and runs an exclusive channel for education called KITE VICTERS (Versatile ICT Enabled Resource for Students), which is aired from 6am to 11pm. VICTERS offers interactive virtual classrooms that enable the school students as well as the teachers to directly communicate with the subject experts and educationists.

== Training programmes ==
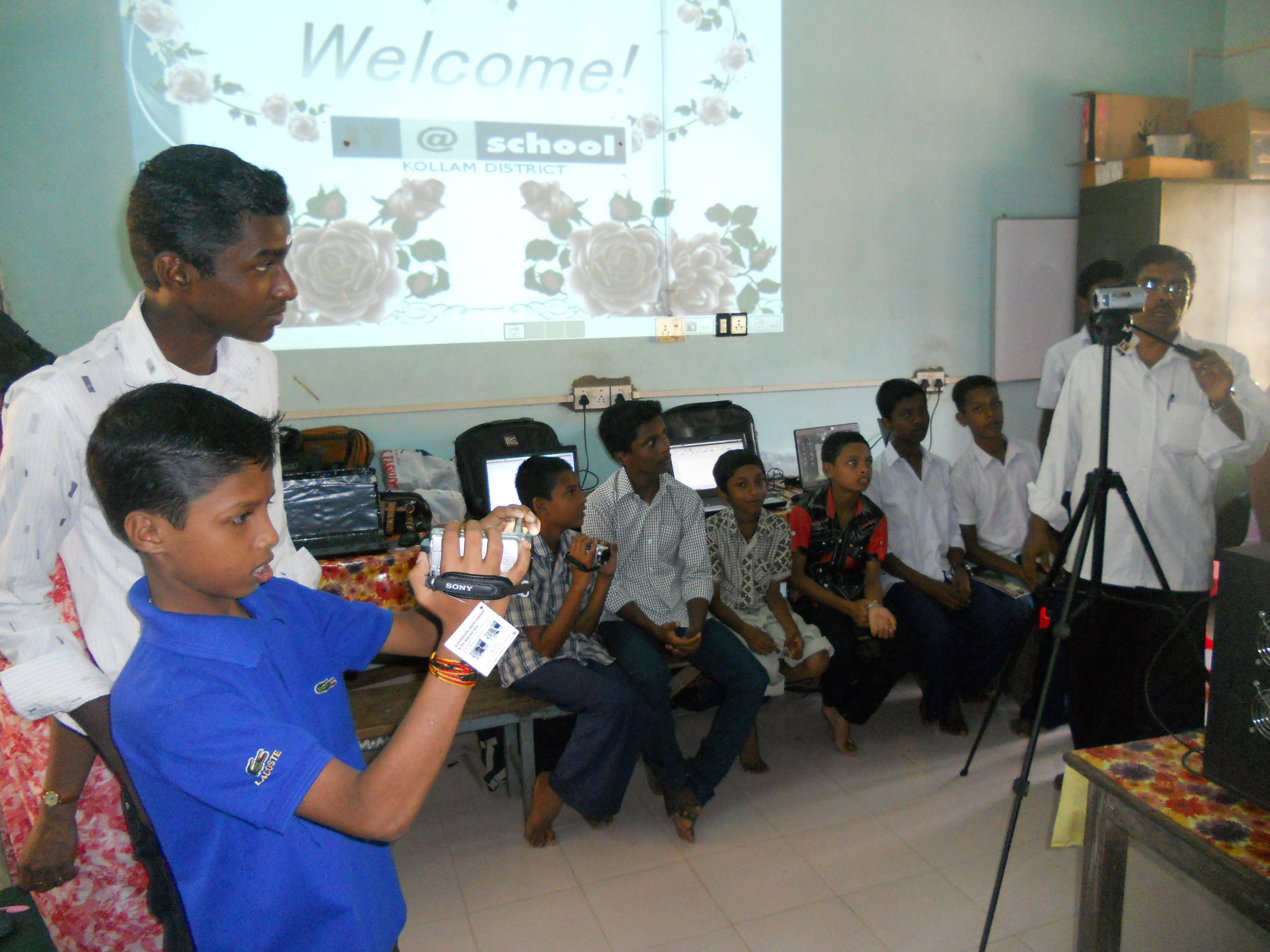
Camera training for students

- ICT training: Training given to familiarise the basics of operating systems and office software packages and other application software.
- Hardware training: 3 day training programme on hardware maintenance and basic support.
- Internet training: This 20 hour training programme was given to all SITCs and interested school teachers. The trained SITC then trained all High School teachers in their school. The government also issued strict instructions that every student in Std X in the school should get at least 10 hours of internet exposure per year.
- IT training for the visually challenged: In association with Insight scheme of Kerala State IT Mission, the Project has successfully imparted IT training using free software for teachers of special schools for visually challenged, by exclusively using free software based screen reading software named ORCA.
- Camera handling training: Two day training on camera handling was given to the teachers, enabling them to create educational videos which could be beneficial in implementing ICT enabled education.
- Training on ICT enabled content: Specific training on ICT enabled content was provided to teachers so as to enable them to use ICT enabled content in all subjects in order to equal teachers in classroom transaction.

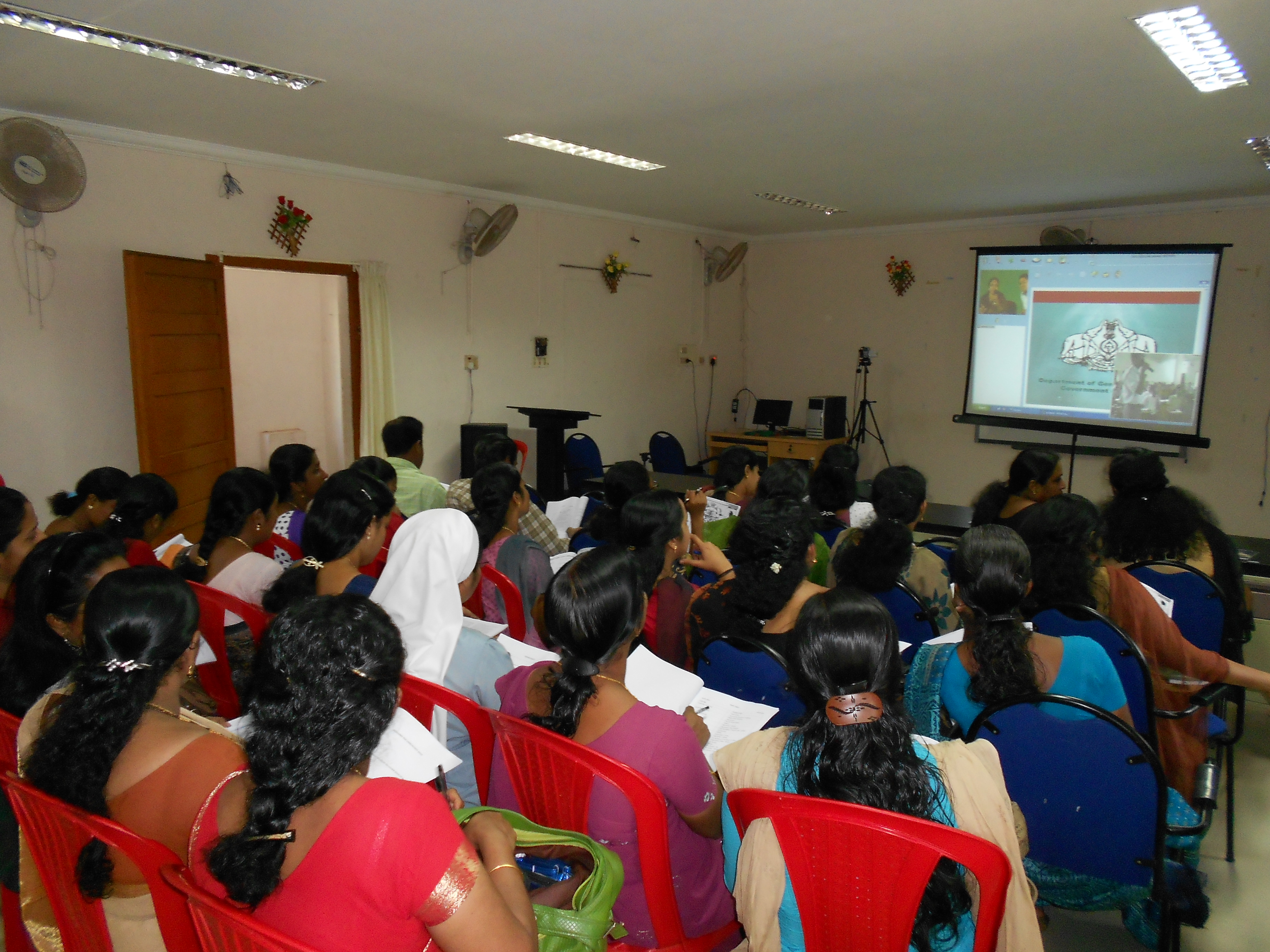
Video conference class for English teachers

- Animation Training Programme for Students (ANTS): The project provided training in animated movie making entirely based on free and open source software such as KToon, GIMP, OpenShot Video Editor and Audacity.

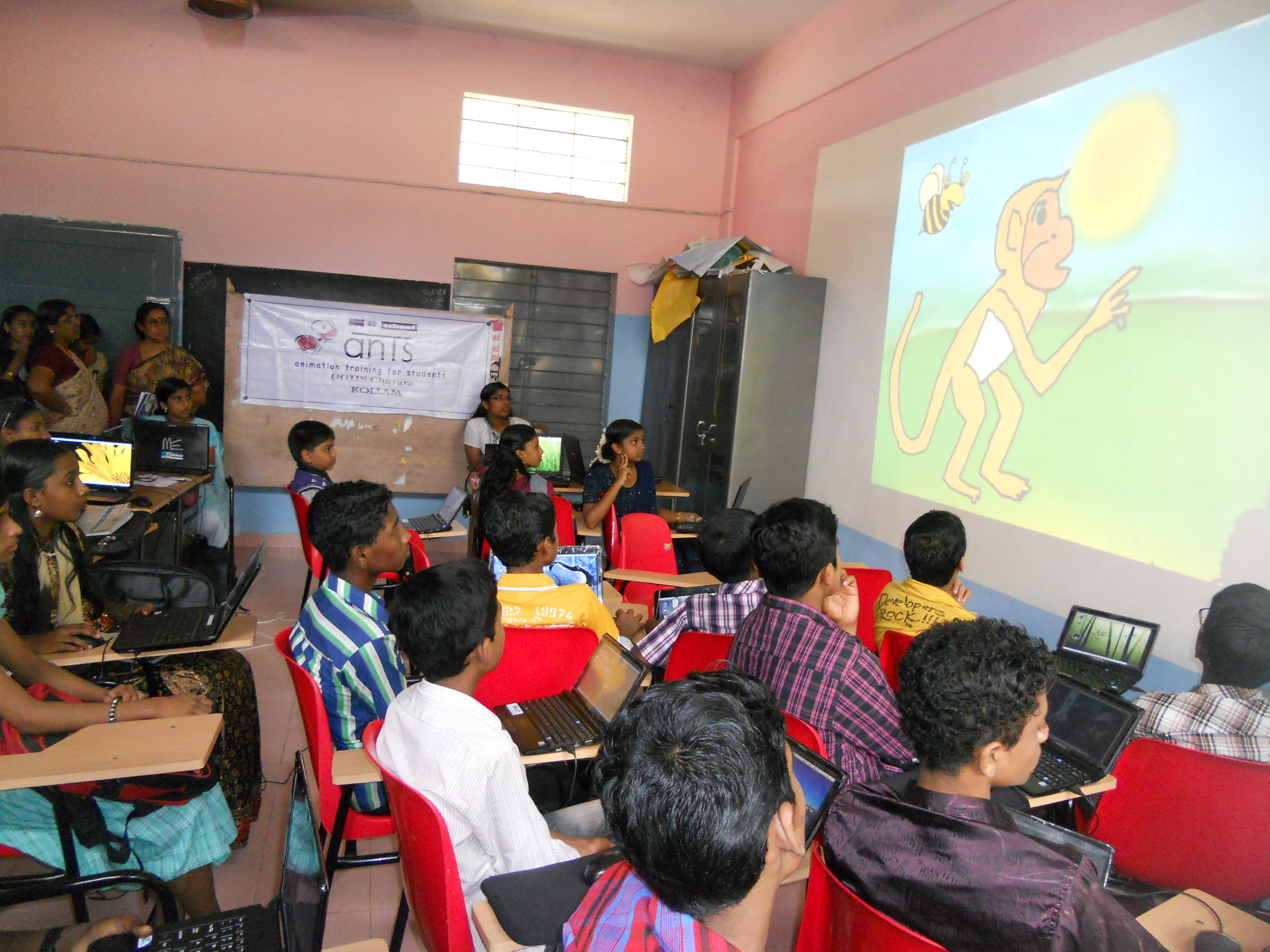
Animation training session in progress

== KITE GNU-Linux ==
The official logo of Kite GNU-Linux 20.04

KITE GNU-Linux previously known as IT@School GNU/Linux is a Debian based Linux distribution that was created for the KITE Project (previously IT@School project) to impart ICT education in public schools in the state. The distribution was originally developed by SPACE and is currently being maintained by the internal team at KITE.

=== IT@School GNU/Linux 18.04 ===
IT@School GNU/Linux is a operating system released by Kite (previously IT@School) it is based on Ubuntu 18.04 with free software customized as per the school curriculum prepared by scert . This operating systems powered more than 2,00,000 computers in various schools under the State Council of Educational Research and Training, Kerala.

=== KITE GNU-Linux lite 2020 ===
KITU GNU-Linux lite 2020 is a operating system released by KITE on international mother language day. This is a lite version of KITE GNU/Linux 18.04 based on ubuntu 18.04 . This was created in order to install it on older computers with low specifications .It also includes a collection of Malayalam unicode fonts and a dedicated English-Malayalm dictionary

=== KITE GNU-Linux 20.04 ===
KITE GNU-Linux 20.04 is a Linux distribution developed by KITE and based on Ubuntu 20.04. The release includes updated versions of many bundled applications and adds the open‑source LibreCAD as the distribution’s CAD software, which is used in place of AutoCAD in Kerala’s engineering courses.

== E Language Lab ==
KITE designed a program to support English Language Teaching (ELT) called the E Language Lab. One component of this program was the development of stories in print, audio, video formats and sharing the same with teachers using the Moodle learning management system. Forty stories were developed during the COVID period and during 2022-23, the program was implemented across the state in government and government aided schools. A longitudinal impact study conducted by the Regional Institute of English, South India, and IT for Change, found significant improvement in student English communication skills.

== Little Kites ==
Little kites IT Club is an initiative of KITE which features more than 1 lakh student members.

Students are given intense training in areas such as Animation, Cyber Safety, Malayalam Computing, Hardware and Electronics.

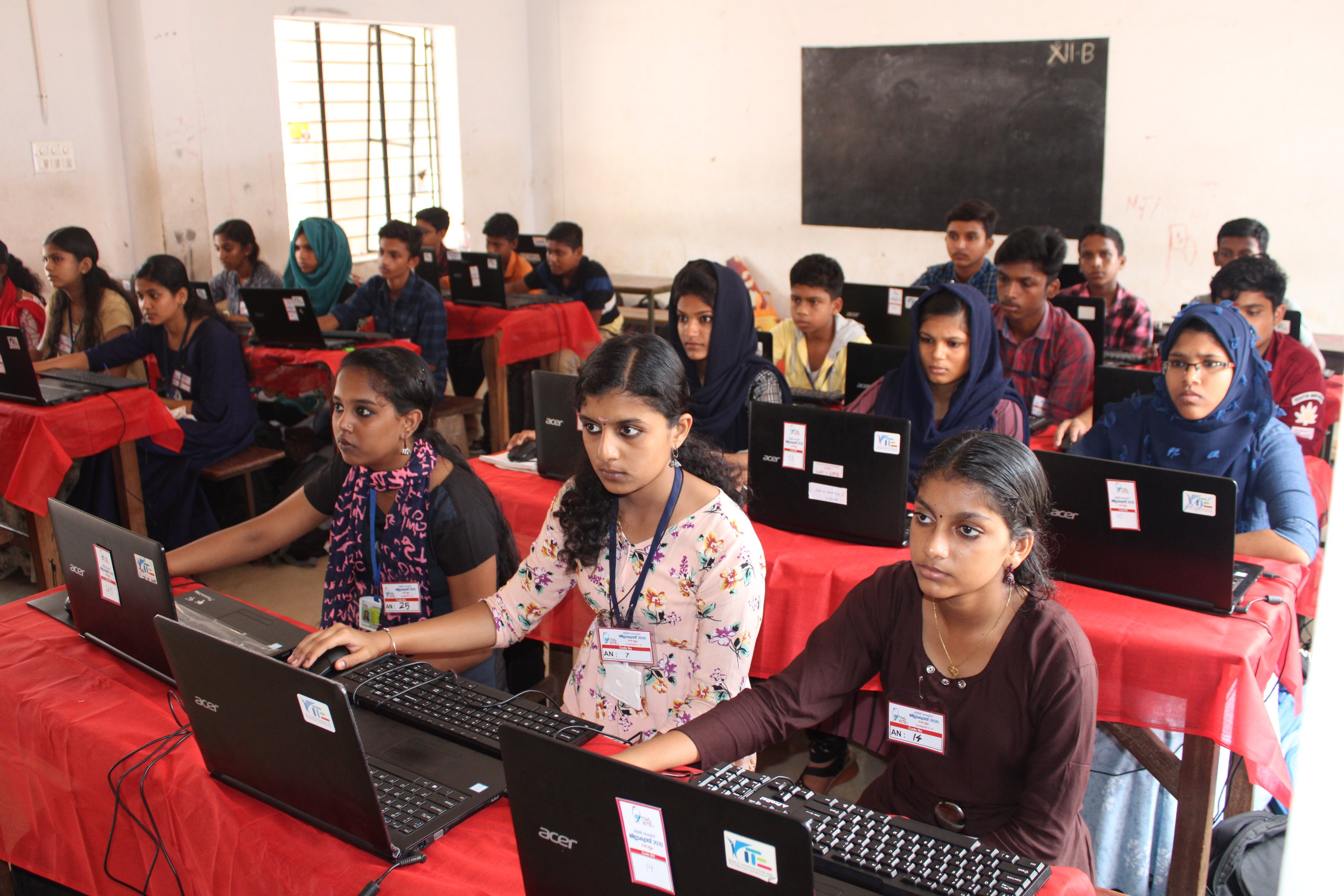
Little Kites Kollam district camp 2020

Little kites is the largest Student IT Network in India.

== FOSS initiatives ==
Some of the free software applications developed or customized by the Project include the following.

1. Application software like OpenOffice, GIMP, Dr. Geo, Rasmol, KEduca, Klab etc.
2. Examination software – to conduct IT practical examination to more than 1.6 million students
3. Handbook for Linux – prepared as a user manual
4. Training modules in Linux – to train teachers in open source
5. Textbook for standard 8th, 9th, and 10th classes– Prepared in association with SCERT

== Implementation of SPARK ==
The "Service Payroll Administrative Repository for Kerala" (SPARK) is a program of Department of Information Technology (DIT) of the state's government for digitizing the service book details of all employees of the state so that the database could be used for the decision makers and to ensure the welfare of the employees.

== School Wiki ==
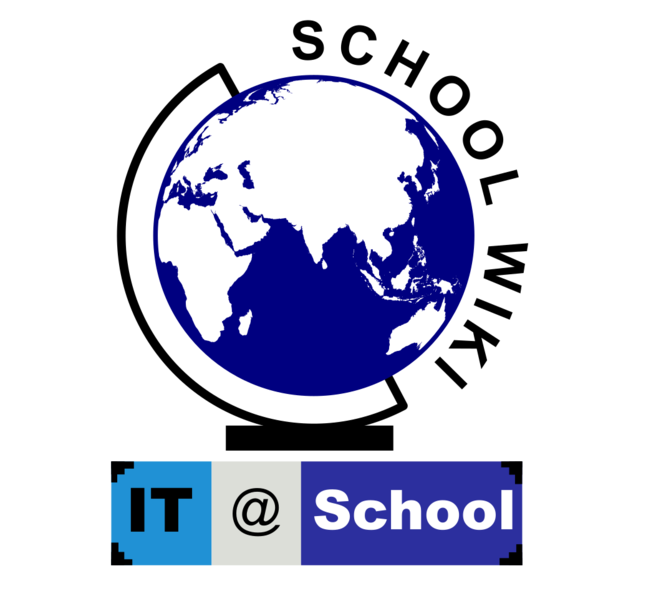

School Wiki, modelled on Wikipedia, attempts to foster the culture of collaborative learning in Kerala's schools. This collaborative website is completely prepared in Malayalam.

All schools in the state include their educational contents and other details in their allotted space. Each school would be able to enter details such as basic elementary data, their historical references, statistics, infrastructure details, details of alumni, school websites and blogs, various clubs and forums, class magazines, supporting images and videos. Apart from these contents, analytical language projects such as 'Pradeshika patram' – school newsletter, 'Nadodi Vijnanakoshan' – local encyclopedia and 'Ente Nadu' - 'My Village', which are part of learning Malayalam language, would also be entrusted to all students in Std 8, 9 and 10 respectively, which, under the guidance of language teachers, would be completed and the reports and findings would enrich the knowledge base of School Wiki. By facilitating the students to access and modify all contents in School Wiki, the project also ensures the participation of the general public including school alumni.

== Total Physical Fitness Programme software ==
The "Total Physical Fitness Programme" software manages fitness details of 30 lakh students are available for further action.

== Accolades ==
Title	Category	Year
National e-governance Awards	Best project	2005
e-India Awards		2008
World is Open Awards		2008
Open Document Format Alliance Awards		2009
Kerala state e-governance Awards		2010
Stockholm Challenge Awards	Honorable mention in the education category	2010
e-India Awards	Best skill development initiatives of the year for ANTS	2011
State television Awards	Best Narration, Best Education Program	2017
Social media for Empowerment Awards South Asia (SM4E)	Special mention	2017
Digital Technology Sabha Awards		2018
World Education Summit Award	Hi-tech school Project	2018
State Television Awards	Best students programme, Best Anchoring (Edu. programme), Best documentary (General), Best Commentator, Special jury mention (Documentary)	2018
CIET-AICEAVF	Best video programme in senior secondary division	2018
State Television Awards	Best students programme	2019
State Television Awards	Best students programme and Best Anchor	2020
mBillionth Awards South Asia	Learning and Education	2021
Social media for Empowerment Awards South Asia (SM4E)	Innovations @Covid19	2021
E-Governance champion Award		2022
World Education Summit Awards	Platform for online classes	2022
Digital Technology Sabha Awards	Cloud category in government sector	2022
CM's Award for innovations in public policy		2022
